= Noise Pop Festival =

Annual music and arts festival in the San Francisco Bay Area

Noise Pop Music and Arts Festival
- Genre: Rock, indie, hip-hop, electronic dance music
- Location: San Francisco Bay Area
- Years active: 1993–2020, 2022–present
- Founders: Noise Pop
- Website: noisepopfest.com

Noise Pop Festival is an annual week-long music and arts festival that takes place throughout the San Francisco Bay Area produced by Noise Pop. From 1993 to 2020, and then resuming in 2022, Noise Pop Festival has provided exposure to some emerging artists, many of which have gone on to widespread acclaim, including The White Stripes, Modest Mouse, Death Cab for Cutie, The Flaming Lips, The Shins, Fleet Foxes and Bright Eyes.

== History ==
Noise Pop Festival began in 1993 as a "5 bands for 5 dollars show" at the Kennel Club (later renamed the Independent). Tickets were $5 and although it was only one day, it was called the S.F. Noise Pop Festival. It has expanded to a nine-day festival across nearly every major and independent venue in San Francisco.

This festival went on hiatus in 2021 due to the COVID-19 pandemic.

== List of lineups ==
=== 1993 ===
Bitchcraft, Carlos!, Corduroy, The Fastbacks, Overwhelming Colorfast

=== 1994 ===
Bitchcraft, Bracket, Cara de Nada, Carlos!, Corduroy, The Fastbacks, Four Point Star, Hazel, The Meices, Overwhelming Colorfast, The Red Aunts, The Supersuckers, Tina Age 13.

Friday, January 28 to Sunday, January 30, 1994. The poster artwork was made by local tattoo artist Mike Davis. Three days this time, $15 festival pass and featuring 13 bands, all at the Bottom of the Hill.

=== 1995 ===
Alcohol Funnycar, Baby Carrot, Bracket, Carlos!, Corduroy, Creeper Lagoon, Engine, The Fastbacks, Flake, Flop, Fluf, Inch, Jawbreaker, Knapsack, The Meices, Overwhelming Colorfast, Package, P.E.E., Slider, Snowmen, Uncle Joe's Big Ole Driver.

One extra day was added to the festival's third year from Thursday, January 26 to Sunday, January 29, 1995, featuring 21 bands in 3 venues.

=== 1996 ===
Actionslacks, American Sensei, Bracket, Carlos!, Chixdiggit, Clarke Nova, Colorfast, Creeper Lagoon, Farflung, The Fastbacks, Groovie Ghoulies, Hugh, Magic Paper, Maxiwagon, The Mieces, No Knife, Peppercorn, Red 5, Skiploader, Skyscraper, Spackle, Supersuckers, Tenderloin, 30.06, Tilt, Trackstar.

Thursday, February 22 to Sunday, February 26, 1996, featuring 26 bands in 4 venues.

=== 1997 ===
Actionslacks, Archers of Loaf, Bracket, Carlos!, Chixdiggit, Crash & Brittany, Creeper Lagoon, Death Star, Decal, Engine 88, Jeremy Enigk, Fastbacks, The Foster Brooks, Fluf, Frogpond, Go Pound Salt, Hazel, Henry's Dress, Knapsack, Limp, Me First, The Meices, Model Rockets, The Moons, Overwhelming Colorfast, Papas Fritas, P.E.E., The PeeChees, Peppercorn, Red Red Meat, Retriever, Rock Band #47, Snowmen, Spoon, Trackstar.

Wednesday, February 26 to Sunday, March 2, 1997, with 35 bands in 5 venues.

=== 1998 ===
Actionslacks, The Androgynauts, The Apples in Stereo, Baby Carrot, Beulah, Carlos!, Chixdiggit, Creeper Lagoon, Crumb, Fastbacks, The Flaming Lips Boombox Experiment #4 (see here), Flavius, The Foster Brooks, Fuck, Frank Black and The Catholics, Galaga, Imperial Teen, Harvey Danger, John Doe Thing, The Keeners, Kingdom First, Knapsack, Lunchbox, MK-Ultra, Modest Mouse, Oranger, P.E.E., Peppercorn, Pure Joy, 7th Betty, 16 Deluxe, Red Planet, Scenic Vermont, Slower Than, Trackstar, Verbow, Warm Wires.

Featuring 37 bands in 5 venues, from Wednesday, February 25 to Sunday, March 1, 1998.

=== 1999 ===
The Aislers Set, Alien Crime Syndicate, Beulah, Bitesize, Bracket, Carlos!, Creeper Lagoon, Crumb, Dealership, Death Cab for Cutie, Elevator Drops, Fastbacks, Fiver, Gardener, Glasstown, Grandaddy, Guided by Voices, I Am Spoonbender, Imperial Teen, Jimmy Eat World, Kingdom First, Lunchbox, Magnolia Thunderfinger, Me First, Murder City Devils, Oranger, Push Kings, Red Stars Theory, Rocket from the Crypt, Rodriguez, Sense Field, 764-HERO, 16 Deluxe, Snowmen, Trackstar.

Featuring 35 bands in 6 venues, from Tuesday, February 23 to Sunday, February 28, 1999.

=== 2000 ===
In 2000, there were two Noise Pop Festivals that took place: February 29-March 5 in San Francisco & May 10-May 15 in Chicago.

==== San Francisco ====
The Aislers Set, Alien Crime Syndicate, Beulah, Franklin Bruno, Carlos!, Chixdiggit, Crooked Fingers, Dealership, Death Cab for Cutie, Earlimart, Electro Group, Fastbacks, Fiver, Fluke Starbucker, For Stars, The Get-Go, Groovie Ghoulies, I Am Spoonbender, Jim Yoshii Pile-Up, Jonah's Onelinedrawing, Limp, The Loud Family, The Magnetic Fields, Man Or Astro-man?, Mates of State, Me First, Bob Mould, The Mountain Goats, Nar, Oranger, Peter Parker, Rumah Sakit, Secadora, Shimmer Kids, Kyle Statham (of Fuck), Sunless Day, Sunset Valley, Thingy, Track Star, John Vanderslice, X

Featuring 41 bands in 5 venues for 6 days, Noise Pop Festival introduced film into its line up and created the Noise Pop Film Festival, a series of film screenings related to music: documentaries, rockumentaries, music mockumentaries, etc.

==== Chicago ====
The Aluminum Group, Anderson/Kowald/Drake, The Apples in Stereo, The Bangs, Blonde Redhead, Brokeback, John Butcher, Califone, Terry Callier, Chicago Underground Quartet, Devil in a Woodpile, John Doe, Floridis/Vandermark/Jaume, Fred Lonberg-Holm, Cor Fuhler & Chicago Friends, Rebecca Gates, The Gossips, Grandaddy, Robbie Hardkiss, Boris Sinclair Hauf, Andre Jaume, Ken Vandermark's Sound in Action Trio, Kowald/Sommer/Floridis, Lady D, For Soul Only, Jon Langford, Ernst Long, LOOS, Mike Ireland and Holler, Chris Mills, Modest Mouse, Pete Nathan, Colin Newman, OK Go, Oranger, Jim O'Rourke, Original Harmony Ridge Creekdippers, Carlos Ortega, Pan American, Paul Wertico Trio, Sam Prekop, Seam, Silo, Sleater-Kinney, Günter "Baby" Sommer, Tobias, Jeff Tweedy, Unwound, Verbow, Versus, Wire.

=== 2001 ===
==== San Francisco ====
Actionslacks, The Aislers Set, Alien Crime Syndicate, Azure Ray, The Bellrays, Beulah, Blonde Redhead, Bright Eyes, Call and Response, Carlos!, The Church Steps, The Court & Spark, Creeper Lagoon, Crooked Fingers, DJ Me DJ You, Droo Church, Mark Eitzel, Fastbacks, Fiver, From Bubblegum to Sky, Girls Against Boys, Holly Golightly, The Good Life, Henry Miller Sextet, The Icarus Line, Jet Black Crayon, Jim Yoshii Pile-up, Jimmy Eat World, Jolly, Damien Jurado, The Kingsbury Manx, Lost Kids, Cole Marquis, Mates of State, Me First, The Minus 5, Money Mark, No Forcefield, Aaron Nudelman, Onelinedrawing, The Orange Peels, Oranger, Papercuts, The Pattern, Pedro the Lion, Persephone's Bees, Pinq, Pleasure Forever, Pocket For Corduroy, Preston School of Industry, Saint Andre, 764-HERO, 7th Standard, The Shins, Skiptrace, Spoon, Starflyer 59, The Stratford 4, Matt Suggs, Sunday's Best, Superchunk, Tarentel, Trackstar, John Vanderslice, Vue, The White Stripes, The Young Fresh Fellows, Zen Guerrilla.

==== Chicago ====
Fred Anderson, Antipop Consortium, Atombombpocketknife, Autechre, Robert Barry, The Bellrays, The Bevis Frond, Bobby Stratosphere and the Bloodclub, Busy Signals, Casolando, The Chamber Strings, Cibo Matto, Couch, Creeper Lagoon, Cursive, Damon and Naomi with Kurihara of Ghost, The Dismemberment Plan, Kevin Drumm, 8 Bold Souls, Eleventh Dream Day, Enon, Evil Bearer, Fruitbats, Goldfrapp, Guided by Voices, Jah Wobble & Deep Space, The Jimmy Smith Group, K-Rad, L'Altra, Mike Ladd, Mat Maneri, Mac McCaughan, Neko Case & Joey Burns, 90 Day Men, Pinebender, Pinetop Seven, Preston School of Industry, Pulseprogramming, Rob Hall & Russell Haswell, Songs:Ohia, Stars, Suicide, Sur La Mer, Television, Tenki, Ken Vandermark, DJ Warp, Wagon Christ, We Ragazzi, Yo La Tengo

=== 2002 ===
Actionslacks, Adult, The Aislers Set, Alaska, Aveo, Azure Ray, Baby Carrot, Beachwood Sparks, Big Star, Buellton, Built Like Alaska, Call And Response, Chantigs, Court and Spark, Daniel Johnston, David Dondero, Dealership, Death Cab for Cutie, The Dirtbombs, The Dismemberment Plan, The Donnas, Ee, Electro Group, Elephone, The Evening, The Extra Glenns, The Faint, Fastbacks, Fields of Gaffney, Film School, Fiver, Fluf, Folk Implosion, For Stars, Gadget, Ghost Orchids, The Go, The Good Life, Gorky's Zygotic Mynci, Guided by Voices, Hot Wire Titans, I Am Spoonbender, Imperial Teen, Jason Lytle (of Grandaddy), John Doe & Neko Case, KaitO, The Lilys, Lois Maffeo & Greg Moore, The Long Winters, Lunchbox, M. Ward, The Makers, Matt Pond PA, Mellow Drunk, Migala, Modest Mouse, Moldy Peaches, The Moore Bros, The New Pornographers, Oranger, Overwhelming Colorfast, The Pattern, Paula Frazer, Pedro the Lion, Persephone's Bees, Pinq, Pleasure Forever, +/-, The Posies, Preston School of Industry, Richmond Sluts, Rilo Kiley, Sara Shannon, Seldom, The Sermon, Stratford 4, The Substitutes, Trackstar, 20 Minute Loop, The Velvet Teen, Versus, Vervein, Virgil Shaw, Visqueen, Vue, Whysall Lane, Xiu Xiu, Zmrzlina

=== 2003 ===
DJ Aaron Axelsen, Alaska, DJ Alicia (The Aislers Set), Ball Point Birds, Hudson Bell, The Blood Brothers, DJ Roddy Bottum, Built Like Alaska, The Burly Earls, Calexico, Camper Van Beethoven, Carlos Forster (For Stars) & The Meeting Places, Cat Power, Ceramic Isles, Citizens Here and Abroad, Communiqué, Court and Spark, The Coyotes, Creeper Lagoon, Crime in Choir, Crooked Fingers, The Cuts, Dead Moon, Dealership, The Dirtbombs, Mia Doi Todd, The Donnas, Downway, Nicolai Dunger, The Dying Californian, Eleventeen, Erase Errata, Fast Forward, Fields of Gaffney, Film School, Firecracker, Fiver, Fojimoto, The Folk Implosion, Nik Freitas, The Go, Har Mar Superstar, Hockey Night, Peggy Honeywell, Hot Rod Circuit, Ill Lit, Imperial Teen, Jackpine Social Club, The Jealous Sound, DJ Jonny Deeper, Junior Panthers, DJ Kid Frostbite, Kirby Grips, DJ Sharky Laguana, The Librarians, The Locust, Stephen Malkmus and the Jicks, Milemarker, Minus the Bear, Moore Bros., The Mountain Goats, Joanna Newsom, No Knife, OK Go, On The Speakers, Onelinedrawing, Panty Lions, Patrick Park, The Pattern, Plain High Drifters, The Pleased, Preston School of Industry, The Rattlesnakes, Record Player Tommy Guerrero, Replicator, Rooney, Roots of Orchis, The Rum Diary, The Sermon, The Small Hours, (Smog), Starflyer 59, Kelley Stoltz, Stratford 4, The Suicide Girls, Swords Project, DJ Tangbeer, Time Spent Driving, Tom Hayman, Tortoise, Trackstar, Trans Am, Truxton, Tsunami Bomb, Tussle, Under a Dying Sun, John Vanderslice, The Velvet Teen, The Von Bondies, M. Ward, Western, Whysall Lane

=== 2004 ===
Actionslacks, The Advantage, The Aluminum Group, Alias, All Bets Off, All Night Radio, American Music Club, Audio Learning Center, Devendra Banhart, Hudson Bell, The Bellyachers, Black Cat Music, Bonfire Madigan, The Bother, British Sea Power, Built Like Alaska, Call and Response, Canoe, Cex, Citizens Here and Abroad, The Clarke Nova, Coachwhips, CocoRosie, Comets on Fire, Communique, The Court & Spark, The Cuts, Dead Meadow, Dead Science, The Decemberists, The Decoration, The Demons, Denali, The Detroit Cobras, The Dillinger Escape Plan, Dios, David Dondero, Dying Californian, Earlimart, The Elected, Elephone, Ester Drang, The Evening, The Everyothers, Fayvor Love, 50 Foot Wave, Film School, Fivehead, 400 Blows, Sage Francis, Gary Young's Hospital, Grand Buffet, Heavenly States, Henry Miller Sextet, The Herms, Jolie Holland, Holy Kiss, Hospital, I Am Spoonbender, Irving, Jesse Sykes and the Sweet Hereafter, Frank Jordan, KaitO, Knife and Fork, Kung Fu USA, Laguardia, The Locust, Loose in the Wild, Loquat, Low, Low Flying Owls, MacLethal, Midnight Movies, The Minders, Monolith, Nedelle and Tom, Neko Case and Friends, Joanna Newsom, On The Speakers, Oranger, The Panty Spanons, Papa M, Paradise Island, Pedro the Lion, The Peels, Persephone's Bees, Pidgeon, Plan B, +/-, Polar Eyes, Preston School of Industry, The Proles, Pure Joy, The Quails, The Red Thread, Restiform Bodies, Rilo Kiley, Rock & Roll Adventure Kids, DJ Ursula Rodriguez, Rogue Wave, The Rum Diary, Salem Lights, Sanford Arms, The Scramblers, Seksu Roba, Sgt. Major, Shoehouse, Six Organs of Admittance, The Sleaves, The Starlight Desperation, DJ Ben Steidel, The Stills, Kelley Stoltz, Stratford 4, Super Furry Animals, The Swords Project, Timonium, Tippy Canoe, Trachtenburg Family Slideshow Players, Truxton, Tussle, 28th Day, Two Gallants, The Tyde, The Unicorns, United State of Electronica, John Vanderslice, The Velvet Teen, Vetiver, Visqueen, Vue, The Washdown, Why?, Willpower, Willy Mason, Wrangler Brutes, The Wrens, Your Enemies Friends

=== 2005 ===
Keren Ann, Aqueduct, Hudson Bell, Big D and the Kids Table, Built Like Alaska, Chow Nasty, The Comas, Comets on Fire, Communiqué, Conspiracy of Beards, Amy Cooper, Damon and Naomi, The Devil Makes Three, DeVotchKa, The Ditty Bops, David Dondero, Nicolai Dunger, Earlimart, The Ebb and Flow, Enorchestra, Erase Errata, Every Move a Picture, Fayvor Love, Film School, The Flying Luttenbachers, Nik Freitas, From Bubblegum to Sky, The Fucking Champs, Inara George, Giant Drag, A Girl Called Eddy, The Golden Republic, The Heavenly States, The Helio Sequence, Henry Miller Sextet, The Herms, High on Fire, Micah P. Hinson, Toshio Hirano, The Hold Steady, Hospitals, Hot Hot Heat, The Impossible Shapes, Irving, The Joggers, Frank Jordan, Knife and Fork, Kylesa, Jens Lekman, Les Georges Leningrand, Louis XIV, The Lovemakers, The Mall, Mates of State, Minipop, Mission of Burma, Bob Mould, Alexi Murdoch, Nada Surf

=== 2006 ===
Feist, John Vanderslice, Youth Group, The Botticells, Every Move a Picture, Scissors for Lefty, Communique, Push to Talk, Deadboy & the Elephantmen, Ex-Boyfriends, Rum Diary, Stephen Fretwell, The Flaming Lips, Startdeath & White Dwarfs, Midlake, DJ Aaron Axelson, ISIS, These Arms are Snakes, Zombi, The Holy See, Billy Nayer Show, Teri Fallini, Hopewell, Henry Miller Sextet, Tommy Guerrerro, Bing Ji Ling, Curumin, Honeycut, The Dirtbombs, Black Lips, The Lamps, Sensations, The Cuts, Col. Knowledge & the Lickity-Splits, A-Fir Ju Well, Heavenly States, Audrye Sessions, New Trust, Mandrake, Britt Daniel, Laura Veirs, Martyn Leaper, Meric Long, Rogue Wave, Aqueduct, Octopus Projects, Scabble, Her Space Holiday, Loquat, Pants Pants Pants, Nous Non Plus, Hey Willpower, Parks and Recreation, Space Mtn, Kieran Hedben and Steve Redi, Kid606 & Friends, Mattson 2, Huts, The National, Mark Eitzel, Talkdemonic, Division Day, The Herms, Citizens Here & Abroad, Why?, Asobi Seksu, Dirty Projectors, Black Fiction, Thursday, Minus the Bear, The #12 Looks Like You, We're All Broken, Sam Pekop & Archer Prewill (The Sea and Cake), David Bazan (Pedro the Lion), Elvis Perkins, The Czars, Two Gallants, Silversun Pickups, Street to Nowhere, Cold War Kids, The New Amsterdams, Slow Runner, The Brokedown, Ryan Harper, Chow Nasty, Books on Tape, Post Coitus, Jason Collett, Etienne De Rocher, The Submarines, Alina Simone, We Are Scientists, Foreign Born, The Grates, The Blood Arm, Film School, Cloud Room, Birdmonster, Send For Help, I Am the Avalanche, Summer Obsession, Overview, Wolfmother, Parchman Farm, Danava, Dear Kerosene, The Velvet Teen, Xiu Xiu, Minipop, Polar Bears, Kid Koala, DJ Relm, J Boogie's Dubtronic Science, DJ J Boogie, David Dondero, Craig Wedren, El Olio Wolof, Dead Science, Company Car, Locke 'n' Load, The Silencers, Nothing Cool, Brothers Past, Hijack the Disco, Parker Street Cinema, Motion Potion, Smoosh, Two Seconds, Lou Lou & the Guitarfish, Just 3 Guys, Trainwreck Riders, Gavin Newsom, Pine Box Boys, Ghost Family, Vetiver, Brightblack Morning Light, Neil Halstead, Peggy Honeywell, Sean Hayes, Geoff Farina, Chris Brokaw, Trains Across The Sea.

=== 2007 ===
Freedm Night, Tapes 'n Tapes, Har Mar Superstar, Extra Action Marching Band, Hella, Pop Levi, Macromatics, Tartufi, Willy Mason, The Watson Twins, Ryan Auffenberg, Built for the Sea, The Bent Moustache, Love of Diagrams, The New Trust, Damien Jurado, The Submarines, Black Fiction, Who Is Harry Nilsson (And Why Is Everybody Talkin' About Him)?, You're Gonna Miss Me, Josh Ritter, Etienne de Rocher, Laura Gibson, Nicki Chambly, Alexi Murdoch, Aqueduct, Midnight Movies, Send for Help, Matt & Kim, Erase Errata, No Age, Pants Pants Pants, Lyrics Born, The Coup, Roky Erickson and the Explosives, Oranger, Howlin' Rain, Wooden Shjips, French Kicks, Scissors For Lefty, The Oohlas, Magic Bullets, Trainwreck Riders, Poor Bailey, The Morning Benders, Sonic Youth, The Donnas, Boyskout, Bellavista, Push to Talk, Annuals, Simone Dawes, Pilot Speed, Ray Barbee & the Mattson 2, Jolie Holland, David Dondero, St. Vincent, Ted Leo and the Pharmacists, Georgie James, So Many Dynamos, Pony Come Lately, Autolux, Snowden, Malajub, Death of a Party, The Dandy Warhols, Audrye Sessions, Elephone, DJ Aaron Axelson, State Radio, The New Amsterdams, Street to Nowhere, The Actual, Vic Chesnutt, Zach Rogue, Thao Nguyen, Alela Diane, The Ponys, Lemon Sun, The Gris Gris, Rum Diary, Dead Meadow, Starlight Desperation, Spindrift, LoveLikeFire, Brightblack Morning Light, Women and Children, Mariee Sioux, Karl Blau, Clinic, Earlimart, Sea Wold, The Mumlers, Ghostland Observatory, Honeycut, The Gray Kid, Land Shark, The Spinto Band, dios (malos), The Changes, The Old Fashioned Way, Cake, Money Mark, The Botticellis, Scabble, Midlake, Minipop, Ester Drang, Minmae, Dwarves, Girl Band, The White Barons.

=== 2008 ===
Minipop, The Entrance Band, The Mumlers, West Indian Girl, Two Sheds, Trophy Fire, honey.moon.tree, Golden Animals, The Walkmen, The Broken West, Nyles Lannon, A Modern Machine, Quasi, Little Ones, peoplepeople, The Minor Canon, Fu Manchu, Saviours, ASG, Orchid, Blitzen Trapper, Fleet Foxes, Here Here, Sholi, The Dodos, Of, The Whate, Bodies of Water, Willow Willow, Stellastarr, Birdmoster, Throw me the statue, The Hundred Days, The Magnetic Fields, Interstellar Radio COmpany, Kelley Stoltz, Grand Archives, The Morning Benders, The Weather Underground, Human Giant, Magic Bullets, Voxhaul Broadcast, The Mountain Goats, Heffrey Lewis and the Jitters, Okay, Aim Low Kid, Holy Fuck, A Place to Bury Strangers, White Demin, Vell Vell Vanish, The Rosebuds, Helio Sequence, Film School, The Builders and the Butchers, Built for the sea, Working for a Nuclear Free City, Foxtail Somersault, Cursive, Darker My Love, Judgement Day, The Blacks, Wale, Trackademicks, Nick Catchdubs, Gutter Twins, Great Northern, Monotonix, Apache, British Sea Power, 20 Minute Loop, Colour Music, Off Campus, The Mountains Goats, David Dondero, Tuisa, Conspiracy of Venus, Port O'Briend & Delta Spiritm MSTRKRFT, La Riots, Lazaro Casanova, Sieazmore, The Virgins, Airborne Toxic Event, The Blakes, Man/Miracle, Panther, The Mountains Goats, Tilly and The Wall, Capgun Coup, Tally Hall, Little Teeth, She & Him, Adam Stephens.

=== 2009 ===
Antony and the Johnsons, Stephen Malkmus, Newman, Martha Wainwright, Vincent, No Age, French Kicks, Josh Ritter, The Morning Benders, Ra Ra Riot, The Submarines, Goblin Cock, Dear and the Headlights.

=== 2010 ===
Brookhaven, The Frail, DJ Sleazmore, Disco Shawn, Har Mar Superstart, Yoko Ono Plastic Ono Band, Cornelius, Yuka Honda, Sean Lennon, Harlem, Best Coast, The Sandwiches, Young Prisms, Rogue Wave, Princeton, Man/Miracle, Two Sheds, The Ghost of A Saber Toothed Tiger, If By Yes, DJ Eucademix, Foreign Born, The Fresh and Onlys, Free Energy, The Splinters, Citay/ Scout Niblett, Greg Ashley, Tape Deck Mountain, Far, Stomacher, Picture Atlantic, The Trophy Fire, The Dodos & Magik*Magik, Zee Avi, The Hot Toddies, Leslie and The Badgers, Tiny Television, John Vanderslice, Nurses, Honeycomb, Conspiracy of Venus, Atlas Sound, The Mumlers, The Growlers, Sonny and the Sunsets, The Ferocious Few, Wallpaper, The Limousines, Butterfly Bones, Battlehooch, Four Tet, Nathan Fake, Rainbow Arabia, Scissors for Lefty, Judgement Day, Ghost and the city, Glaciers, Taxes, Memory Tapes, Loquat, Birds & Batteries, Letting UP Despite Great Failures, Magnetic Feilts, Mark Eitzel, PEE, True Widow, Ovens, Grass Widow, We Were promised Jetpacks, The Lonely Forets, Bear Hands, Tempo No Tempo, Mirah, Horse Feathers, Dave Smallen, Carletta Sue Kay, Nico Vega, Music For Animals, Imaad Wasif, Mark Kozelek, Laura Gibson, Paula Frazer, Fences, !!!, Maus Haus, Sugar & Gold, My First Earthquake, Black Prairie, Trainwreck riders, Billy & Dolly, Birds Fled From Me, Dizzy Balloon, The Hounds Below, Visqueen, Laarks, Edward Sharp and the magnetic zeros, The Watson Twins, AB and the Sea, The Northern Key.

=== 2011 ===
A B & The Sea, Admiral Radley, Aesop Rock, Alexi Murdoch, Altars, Angel Island, Apex Manor, Bart Davenport, Battlehooch, Ben Gibbard, Best Coast, Big Light, DJ Big Wiz, Birds & Batteries, The Black Ryder, DJ Britt Govea, The BrokenMusicBox, The Burnt Ones, Butterfly Bones, Chelsea Wolfe, The Concretes, Crazy Band, Dam-Funk, Dan Deacon, Dave Smallen, Dirty Ghosts, Dominant Legs, The Downer Party, Easter Conference Champions, Ed Schrader's Music Beat, Exray's, Fake Your Own Death, Felson, The Ferocious Few, Film School, The Frail, The Fresh & Onlys, Funeral Party, Geographer, Grass Widow, Gregory and the Hawk, The Growlers, Guillermo, Hakobo, Harderships, Hot Fog, How to Dress Well, Hunx and His Punx, Incan Abraham, J House, Jake Mann and the Upper Hand, Jel, Jenny O., Jhameel, K. Flay, Kevin Seconds, Kid Koala, Kimya Dawson, Lily Taylor, The Love Language, Magic Bullets, Max Bemis, Melted Toys, No Age, Nobunny, Oona, Peanut Butter Wolf, The Pleasure Kills, Psychic Friend, Rachel Fannan, Rank/Xerox, Rob Sonic, Robbinschild, Kinski, Royal Baths, Sarah Lee & Johnny, Seventeen Evergreen, Shannon and the Clams, Shlomo, Silje Nes, Sister Crayon, Social Studies, The Soft Moon, The Soft White Sixties, The Stone Foxes, DJ Swayzee, Tamaryn, Ted Leo, Ted Nesseth, Telekinesis, The Trophy Fire, Typhoon, Ume, The Urinals, Versus, Voxhaul Broadcast, Wavves, Wax Idols, Westwood & Willow, Wet Illustrated, The Wrong Words, Yo La Tengo, Young Prisms, Zach Rogue.

=== 2012 ===
Adventure Club, Allah-las, Archers Of Loaf, Greg Ashley, Atlas Sound, Au, DJ Aaron Axelsen, Bare Wires, Sasha Bell, Big Black Delta, Big Freedia, Big Sleep, Big Tree, Bird By Snow, Black Bananas, Bleached, Born Gold, Brilliant Colors, Frank Broyles, BT Magnum, Budos Band, Built Like Alaska, Built To Spill, Cannons & Clouds, Carnivores, Chains Of Love, Chapter 24, Christie Front Drive, Chromatics, Churches, Class Actress, Cursive, Matthew, Dear, Die Antwoord, Dirty Ghosts, Disappears, Distortion+, The Dodos, Double Duchess, Dreams, Electric Flower, Epicsauce DJs, Exray's, Fake Your Own Death, Fidlar, Craig Finn, The Flaming Lips, Carlos Forster, The Fresh & Onlys, Giggle Party, Glass Candy, Great Apes, Grimes, Rachel Haden, Hard French DJs, Here Here, Jolie Holland, Hollerado, Hospitality, Imperial Teen, Cate Le Bon, Lilac, The Lonely Forest, Tyler Lyle, Jonah, Matranga, Maus Haus, Mac Mccaughan, Melted Toys, The M Machine, Bob Mould, Mount Moriah, New Diplomat, DJ Omar, oOoOO, Oranger, Overwhelming Colorfast, Painted Palms, Papercuts, Pennybirdrabbit, Peppercorn, Pickwick, Garrett Pierce, Preteen, Princeton, Ash Reiter, Release the Sunbird, Porter Robinson, Sad Baby Wolf, Sea Of Bees, Seventeen Evergreen, Shannon & The Clams, The She's, Sister Crayon, Sleigh Bells, Slouching Stars, Social Studies, Soft Metals, The Soft Pack, Sonny & The Sunsets, Sun Foot, Surf Club, Surfer Blood, Talkdemonic, Tambo Rays, Taxes, Thao, Tortured Genies, Tropical Popsicle, The 21st Century, 20 Minute Loop, Two Gallants, Ume, John Vanderslice, Laura Veirs, Veronica Falls, Violent Change, Vir, Virgin Islands, Vogue and Tone, Emily Jane White, White Cloud, Will Sprott, Wye Oak, Yalls, Young Mammals, Young Prisms.

=== 2013 ===
!!!, AAN, Aaron Espinoza, Amon Tobin, Ardalan, Bear Mountain, Before the Brave, Black Whales, Blackbird Blackbird, Blasted Canyons, Body/Head, Boyfrnds, Brainstorm, Brogan Bentley, Burmese, Burnt Ones, Califone, Caspian, Ceremony, Chad Salty, Comadre, Cool Ghouls, Cruel Summer, Damien Jurado, Dana Falconberry, DIIV, Dirty Ghosts, DJ Dials, Doe Eye, Dog Bite, DRMS, Dune Rats, Emily Jane White, Ev Kain, Family of the Year, Free Energy, French Cassettes, Future Twin, Fuzz, Föllakzoid, G.Green, Giraffage, Group Rhoda, Harriet, Holy Shit, Honey Soundsystem, Horsebladder, In the Valley Below, IO Echo, James & Evander, Jason Lytle, Jenny O, Joaquin Bartra, Jukebox the Ghost, Kacey Johansing, Lake, Lenz, Lovely Bad Things, Magic Trick, Mahgeetah, Man Without Country, Matt Pond, Maus Haus, Michaek Stasis, Mike Donovan, Miner, Mwahaha, Nanosaur, Native, Naytronix, Noel Von Harmonson, Nosaj Thing, OBN III's, Paul Basic, Peggy Honeywell, Permanent Ruin, Plateaus, Permanent Ruin, Psychic Friend, Psychic Ills, R. Stevie Moore Radar Brothers, Ramona Falls, Rin Tin Tiger, Rogue Wave, Rudebrat, Sallie Ford, & The Sound Outside, Sam Flax, Shock, Sinkane, Sir Sly, Sisu, Social Studies, Sonny & The Sunsets, Starfucker, Supervision, Synthetic ID, Teen Daze, Terry Malts, Thao & The Get Down Stay Down, The Blank Tapes, The Crystal Ark, The Dandelion War, The Fresh & Onlys, The Lighthouse and The Whaler, The Mallard, The She's, The Thermals, The Yellow Dogs, Toro Y Moi, Tussle, Warm Soda, Wax Idols, White Arrows, Will Sprott (of The Mumlers). Wymond Mils, XXYYXX, Yacht

=== 2014 ===
AAN, ASTR, Black Map, Bleached, Blood Sister, Bob Mould: 25 Years of Workbook, Bottomless Pit, BROODS, Cannons and Clouds, Cheatahs, Cities Aviv, Cold Cave, Com Truise, Cool Ghouls, Courtney Barnett, Creative Adult, Dante Elephante, Digital Mystikz, Dirty Ghosts, DJ Aaron Axelsen, DJ Dials, DJ Rashad, Dominant Legs, Dr. Dog, Dream Boys, Dune Rats, EDJ, El Ten Eleven, Extra Classic, Farallons, Fever the Ghost, Foxtails Brigade, Free Salamander Exhibit, French Cassettes, GRMLN, Grown Kids Radio, Happy Fangs, Hindu Pirates, Insightful, Irontom, J.Rocc, James Supercave, Jel, Jimmy Tamborello, Jon Ginoli, Jonah Matranga, Jonwayne, Kan Wakan, Kauf, Kelela, Kins, Kinski, Knxwledge, Ladytron (DJ Set) with Reuben Wu, LASHER KEEN, Lord Huron, Luke Sweeney, Machinedrum, Majical Cloudz, Mark Eitzel, Mark Kozelek, Mark Mulcahy, Matthew Dear Presents Audion: Subverticul, Mattson 2, Maus Haus, Max and the Moon, Mikal Cronin, Miles the DJ, Moses Sumney, Mother Falcon, Mr. Carmack, Mystic Braves, No, No Age, Nova Albion, OLD LIGHT, Painted Palms, Pale Blue Dot, Papercuts, Paradigm, Peanut Butter Wolf, Penny Machine, Phantoms, PURPLE, Real Estate, Rich Girls, Rogue Wave, Saint Rich, Sandy's, Shabazz Palaces, Social Studies, Sonny & The Sunsets, Straight Crimes, Strange Vine, Superhumanoids, Supreme Cuts, Taxes, Terry Malts, The Donkeys, The Fresh & Onlys, The Hundred Days, The Limousines, The SHE'S, The Shilohs, The Soft White Sixties, The Tambo Rays, Throwing Muses, Trails and Ways, Tropical Popsicle, Vertical Scratchers, Vetiver, Vikesh Kapoor, Vir, Waters, Whiskerman, Wild Moth, Wymond Miles, YACHT, Zach Rogue

=== 2015 ===
The New Pornographers, Caribou, Best Coast, Geographer, Jik Adkins, Flight Facilities, Dan Deacon, Thao, How to Dress Well, Cathedrals, James Vincent McMorrow, Slow Magic, Giraffage, The Church, Kindness, Surfer Blood, Craft Spells, Les Sins, Langhorne Slim, !!! DJS, Grouper, Foxes in Fiction, Owen Pallett, Cherry Glazerr, Mystery Skulls, Blackbird Blackbird, No Joy, Screaming Females, Jessica Pratt, The Black Ryder, Kevin Morby, PPL MVR, Cosmonauts, Eleanor Friedberger, Mick Jenkins, TV Girl, Six Organs of Admittance, Sales, Christopher Willits, Tony Molina, K.Flay, Nick Diamnods, Koreless, Touch Sensitive, Lindsay Lowend, Joey Vannucchu, Empires, The Blinda Butchers, Spazzkid, Team Spirit, Johnny Fritz, The Tropics, Silver Swans, Bestie, Haunted Summer, The Shivas, Nude Beach, Vinyl Williams, Chrome Canyon, Monster Rally, Doe Eye, Bells Atlas, The Shes, Mondo Drag, Devon Williams, Dirt Dress, Waterstrider, Yalls, Al Lover, Crashing Hotels, King Woman, Vanish, Cold Beat, Night School, Carroll, Cotillion, Talk in Tongues, Two Sheds, Chasms, Elisa Ambrogio, Icewater, Seattraffic, The Younger Lovers, Hot Flash Heat Wave, Travis Hayes, Balms, El Terrible, Aaron Axelsen, DJ Omar, Moors, DJ Turf Yard, RZN&R, Avidd, Donovan Quinn, Silo Homes

=== 2016 ===
American Football, Metric, Drive Like Jehu, The Mountain Goats, Carly Rae Jepsen, Neon Indian, DIIV, ILOVEMAKONNEN, Parquet Courts, Vince Staples, Bill Callahan, Kamasi Washington, The Magician, Gardens & Villa, The Cave Singers, Sango, Ringo Deathstarr, Hamilton Leithauser and Paul Maroon, Escort, Day Wave, The Thermals, La Sera, Mitski, Cayucas, Antwon, Painted Palms, Kneedelus, Film School, Diane Coffee, The Soft White Sixties, Gems, Wild Ones, Beacon, Wax Idols, Astronauts, Etc., Heartwatch, Palehound, John Moreland, Julien Baker, Natasha Kmeto, Joywave, Just Kiddin, Puro Instinct, Pompeya, Current Swell, Surf Curse, Phoebe Bridgers, Chris Cohen, Foxtails Brigade, Hunny, Harriet, Feels, MObley, DJ Aaron Axelsen, Masego + Traphouse Jazz Band, Charlie Hilton, Hazel English, So Pitted, Rin Tin Tiger, Andrew St. James, Lilly Hiatt, Hot Flash, Heat Wave, Grace and Rachel, Guy Blakeslee, Naytronix, Sun Foot, The Stratford 4, Taxes, Collaj, Future Shapes, Kacey Johansing, Bed, Banta

=== 2017 ===
Vince Staples, Ty Segall, Grandaddy, Deafheaven, Animal Collective (DJ Set), MSTRKRFT, Barclay Crenshaw, Badbadnotgood, Hudson Mohawke, Dawes, Kelis, Radical Face, Cloud Nothings, Creeper Lagoon, The Radio Dept., Temples, Los Campesinos!, Rogue Wave, clipping., Electric Guest, The Joy Formidable, This Will Destroy You, Julien Baker, Benji B, Hanni El Khatib, Julia Holter, Tennis, Tash Sultana, TEKLIFE with Dj Spinn and Taye, Kevin Abstract, Francois K, Shannon and the Clams, Seven Davis Jr., Crocodiles, Moon Duo, The Rural Alberta Advantage, Tacocat, PWR BTTM, White Fence, Hodgy, Teen Daze, Matt Pond PA, Japanese Breakfast, The Mother Hips, The Garden, Night Beats, Tennyson, Kilo Kish, Mothers, The Octopus Project, Hazel English, Diet Cig, Weyes Blood, The Frights, Black Marble, Adia Victoria, The Palms, Uniform, Mozart's Sister, Monster Rally, The Bilinda Butchers, Hoops, Crying, Qrion, Bearface, The Buttertones, Half Waif, Deap Valley, Emma Ruth Rundle, AJ Dávila, Froth, Middle Kids, London O'Connor, Miya Folick, Daddy Issues, Hot Flash Heat Wave, Before The Brave, Elsa y Elmar, Never Young, MANICS, Fine Points, Young Moon, Emily Jane White, Travis Hayes, The New Up, Madeline Kenney, The Molochs, Plush, Rayana Jay, Dante Elephante, Fake Your Own Death, Julia Lewis, MPHD, The Y Axes, Peggy Honeywell, Dinosaurs, JJUUJJUU, Hideout, Tanukichan, Chaos Chaos, The Regrettes, Owl Paws, Great American Canyon Band, NRVS LVRS, No Vacation, The Wild Kindness, Scary Little Friends, Magic Trick, Two Sheds, 20 Minute Loop, Everyone is Dirty, Foxtails Brigade, Cave Clove, Baseck, Lisa Prank, Starfari, Field Medic, Warbly Jets, Sound of Ceres, The Total Bettys, Future Shapes, Nine Pound Shadow, Maggie Y/O, Amanda Rose, Josh Cashman, Mall Walk, Blank Square, Jay Stone, Midnight Sister, Itasca, Hugo, AhSa-Ti Nu, The Young Wild, Crush, Madi Sipes & The Painted Blue, Luke Sweeney, Minihorse, NVO, Callie, Split Single, DONCAT, M. Lockwood Porter, Axis: Sova, N. Lanno, GERMANS, SOAR, Valley Girls, Goon, Kid Trails, Grief Thief, Pumpkin, Flying Circles, Joyride!, The Bye Bye Blackbirds, Boy Scouts, Shutups, Nyre, Hobo Johnson, Affectionately, 93 Bulls, Innovative Leisure DJs, DJ Aaron Axelsen, DJ Dials, Push The Feeling DJS, DJ Marco De La Vega, Cellus, Bear Call, Brasil, Down Dirty Shake, DJ Pegasister, Great Apes, Hot Toddies, O.C.D., Phosphene, Ryan Wong, Set The Controls, The Royal Panics, The Sweet Bones, Trash Vampires

=== 2018 ===
Tune-Yards, Built To Spill performs Keep It Like A Secret, Ty Dolla $ign, Real Estate, Black Rebel Motorcycle Club, Madlib (DJ Set), Jay Electronica, Parquet Courts, San Fermin with The Magik*Magik Orchestra, WHY?, Superchunk, Toro Y Moi (DJ Set), Doug Martsch (Solo Acoustic), Waxahatchee (Solo), Thao & The Get Down Stay Down, Bahamas, Rostam, Shabazz Palaces, Japanese Breakfast, Geographer, The Album Leaf, Langhorne Slim, Jay Som, Tei Shi, Bully, Alex Cameron, Girlpool, Sevdaliza, Dengue Fever, Jessy Lanza (DJ Set), Amy Shark, No Age, Shamir, Bruno Major, Mount Eerie, Cuco, The Coathangers, Jeff Rosenstock, Caleborate, Ben UFO, Enter Shikari, The Hotelier, Carla dal Forno, The Fresh & Onlys, G Perico, Tiny Moving Parts, Bedouine, William Tyler, Racquet Club, Gerd Janson, Sean Rowe, Grails, Crooked Colours, Mister Heavenly, Inara George (of The Bird and The Bee), Shallou, Palehound, Weaves, Night Beats, Miya Folick, Sudan Archives, Florist, 24hrs, Slim Cessna's Auto Club, Ha Ha Tonka, Wildling, Lo-Fang, Dick Stusso, NILBOG, Covet, Meg Baird, MILCK, Mom Jeans., Spiral Stairs, The Weather Station, Molly Burch, Ian Sweet (Solo), Mary Lattimore, Summer Twins, Alex Edelman, Death Valley Girls, Single Mothers, Sam Coomes, Lemuria, Running Touch, Milk Teeth, Chulita Vinyl Club, Lia Ices, Gilligan Moss (DJ Set), Twain, Andrew St. James, Emily Afton, Melkbelly, Oso Oso, Hand Habits, Joy Again, Chasms, Angelo De Augustine, The World, Field Medic, Pardoner, Flesh World, August Eve & Jasper Bones, Iman Europe, Special Explosion, Club Night, The Y Axes, Still Woozy, SOAR, Bat Fangs, The Peacers, George Cessna, Boy Scouts, The Total Bettys, DJ Aaron Axelsen, DJ Omar Perez, Mozhgan, Yeek, Rose Droll, Mall Walk, Sweet Chariot, High Sunn, Cocktails, Long Knives, ROAR, Winter, The Flytraps, Dagmar, Cash Campain, Josiah Johnson, Fake Your Own Death, Feels, Hazey Eyes, Patsy's Rats, GDJYB, Soundtube, Sun Valley Gun Club, Ghost & the City, The Band Ice Cream, Tino Drima, Vákoum, Indy Nyles, Grace Sings Sludge, Derek Ted, Evan Myall, Preening, Chuck Johnson, The Genie, Azuah, awakebutstillinbed, HUMID, Magic Magic Roses, Gray Tolhurst, False Priest, Blue Oaks, Screaming, Lapel, Aish, Remember Karen, Zelma Stone, Love Jerks, Half Stack, Well, Outer Embassy, BLXCK, Lisa Azzolino, Topographies, Host Bodies, Banzai Cliff, Chaki, Agouti, Touchless, Moon Daze, Bear Call, Friendless Summer, COKE, Bruh From Last Night, Same Girls, DJs Layne and Justin Anastasi

=== 2019 ===
Beirut, Yuna, Bob Mould, Princess Nokia, Petit Biscuit, Teenage Fanclub, Nosaj Thing (DJ Set), Albert Hammond Jr, Jason Lytle (of Grandaddy), Saul Williams, Baths, Tourist, Joy Williams (of The Civil Wars), Uffie, MHD, Men I Trust, Daughters, Current Joys, Darlingside, Fruit Bats (Solo) & Vetiver (Solo), Yves Tumor, VHS Collection, Caroline Rose, The Marías, Crumb, MNEK, My Brightest Diamond, MNDSGN, Laura Veirs, Black Marble, Vagabon, Haley Heynderickx, Charlotte Lawrence, Jerry Paper, Kodie Shane, Helado Negro, Kamaal Williams, Miserable, The She's, In The Valley Below, Tommy Newport, Marissa Nadler, Film School, Meg Mac, Ben Morrison (of The Brothers Comatose), Slenderbodies, Qrion, Oh Pep!, Anemone, Jitwam, Kera, The Love Language, River Whyless, illuminati hotties, Club Night, awakebutstillinbed, Partner, Dude York, Michael Seyer, Blanck Mass, Tayla Parx, Gilligan Moss, Travis Hayes, Los Wálters, Field Medic, Chynna, Katzù Oso, Jasper Bones, H.C. McEntire, Briana Marela, Anthony da Costa, Nicotine, Hana Vu, Video Age, Hilary Woods, Swarvy, Lando Chill, Sunsleeper, Sundressed, Alien Boy, Zelma Stone, Shutups, Zola, Same Girls, Blushh, MAITA, Gap Girls, Agouti

=== 2020 ===
Raphael Saadiq, Benjamin Gibbard, Maya Jane Coles, Best Coast, Washed Out, Helado Negro, Bas, Shigeto Live Ensemble, Jamila Woods, Injury Reserve, Bag Raiders, Lower Dens, Imperial Teen, Jennylee + TT (Jenny and Theresa of Warpaint), The Jungle Giants, Joshua Radin & Friends (featuring Ben Kweller & William Fitzsimmons), Sudan Archives, The Stone Foxes, The Greyboy Allstars, Sasami, Jacques Greene, Frances Quinlan, FreqCo, Kilo Kish, Florist, Michael Seyer, Mirah, Chaos in the CBD, Kornél Kovàcs, Califone, Good Morning, Mannequin Pussy

=== 2021 ===
Cancelled

=== 2022 ===
Kamaal Williams, Jeff Tweedy, The Microphones, Alex G, Vegyn, Dorian Electra, William Basinski, Azealia Banks

=== 2023 ===
Yo La Tengo, Boy Harsher, Duster, Strfkr, Fidlar, Bob Mould, Tourist, Covet

=== 2024 ===
Bone Thugs-n-Harmony, Tommy Guerrero, Hailu Mergia, Suzanne Ciani, Ana Roxanne

=== 2025 ===
St. Vincent, Ben Gibbard, Earl Sweatshirt, The American Analog Set, Mercury Rev, Soccer Mommy, SOSA, Cymande

=== 2026 ===
Tortoise, cupcakKe, clipping., Pinback, Bayonne, Tobacco, Shannon Shaw, Beats Antique, Rogue Wave, The Pains of Being Pure at Heart, and more!

== See also ==
- Noise Pop (Music Promoter)
- Treasure Island Music Festival
