= Rob Bisel =

American producer, engineer, songwriter and musician

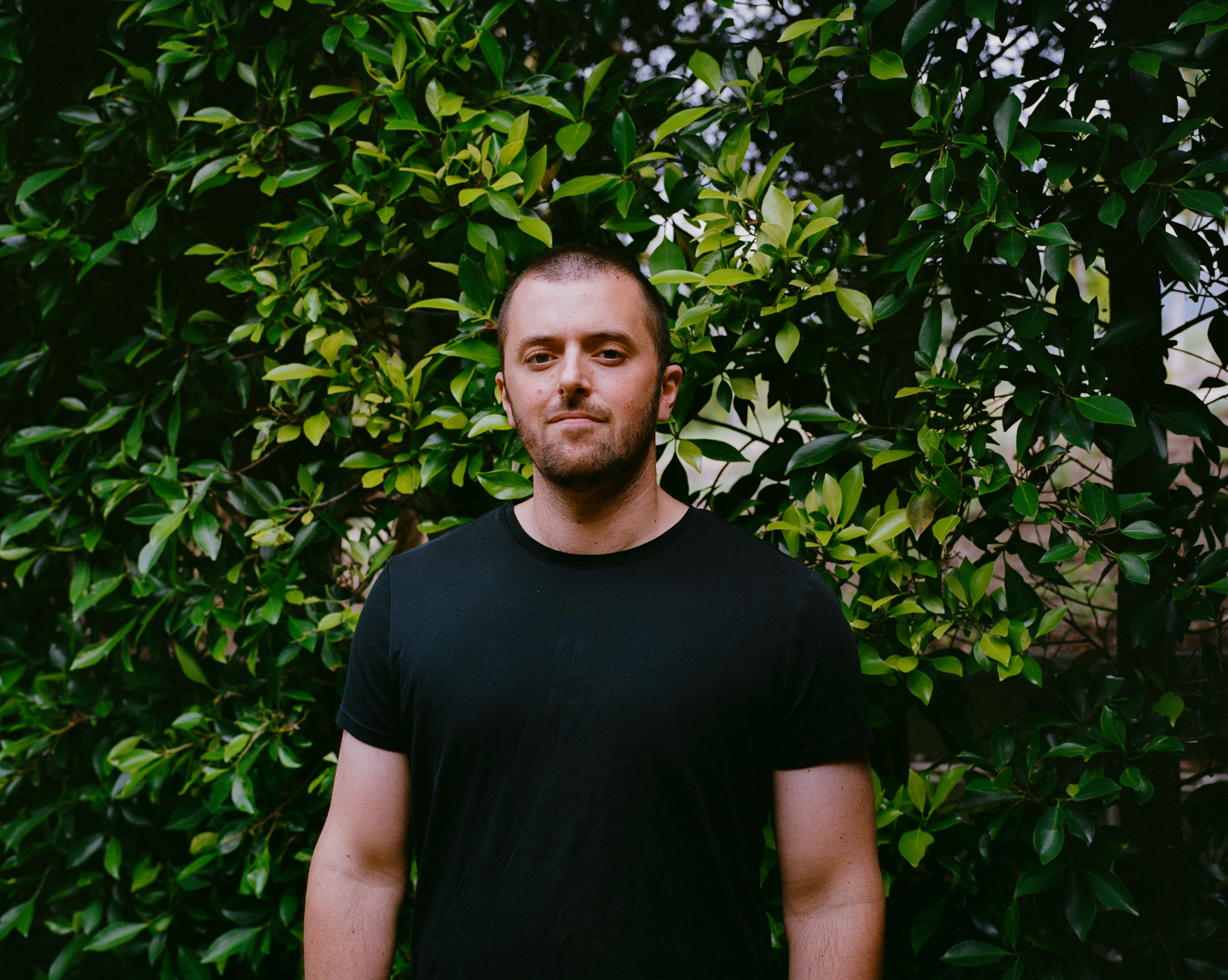
- Bisel in 2023

Background information
- Born: Robert Bisel; 1992 (age 33–34)
- Genres: Pop; neo soul; hip hop; rock
- Occupations: Producer; engineer; mixer; songwriter; multi-instrumentalist
- Years active: 2015–present
- Website: robbisel.com

Rob Bisel is an American music producer, engineer, mixer and songwriter. A four-time Grammy award winner, he has worked with artists including SZA, Doja Cat, Kendrick Lamar, Travis Scott, Harry Styles, Don Toliver and Jennie Kim.

== Early life and education ==
Bisel was raised in Moraga, California and graduated from Campolindo High School the same year as actress Erika Henningsen and musical artist Sven Gamsky (Still Woozy). Although he sang in the school choir and played bass, he was mainly interested in music production. He began recording friends in his bedroom when he was 14, and at 17 got an internship at Studio 880 in Oakland.

Bisel studied music at the University of Michigan. During the summers, he interned for Mark Needham, an engineer and mixer who had worked with artists including Fleetwood Mac and The Killers. Bisel learned from watching Needham mix and later cited him as an influence.

== Career ==
=== Rick Rubin, Shangri-La, Kendrick Lamar, Doja Cat, Grammys ===
Following his college graduation Bisel moved to LA, where he met Dana Nielsen, an engineer who worked frequently with Rick Rubin at Rubin's Shangri-La studio. He was hired as a runner at the studio in 2014, and later worked with Rubin as an assistant engineer and engineer. Bisel said that Rubin inspired him, "fueling his hunger to dive deeper into production."

In addition to Rubin, at Shangri-La Bisel engineered for artists and producers including Mark Ronson, Travis Scott, and Harry Styles. He also served as an engineer on Kendrick Lamar's Mr. Morale & The Big Steppers during the six-month period that Lamar recorded at Shangri-La. In 2022, he worked with Lamar once again, earning a Record of the Year Grammy nomination for "The Heart Part 5" and an Album of the Year nomination for Mr. Morale & the Big Steppers. Bisel was nominated for Grammy awards in the same two categories for engineering Doja Cat's album Planet Her and the single "Kiss Me More" the previous year.

=== SZA and SOS ===
In 2020, Rubin recommended Bisel to SZA, who had booked Rubin's studio and home in Kauai to begin recording her second album, the follow up to her multi-platinum debut, Ctrl. They spent a week in Kauai, "just vibing and coming up with song ideas", before returning to Los Angeles. They picked up their collaboration in LA and were working at SZA's home in Malibu at the start of the COVID-19 pandemic. SZA invited Bisel to shelter-in-place at her house, and together they continued to work on the album. In a 2023 interview, Bisel said: "It was a pretty crazy situation, because she was used to going to big studios with tons of people coming in and out, and suddenly it was just the two of us, and I had to step into much more of a Rick Rubin producer role than just be the typical engineer. It gave me the space to present beats to her that I had made, alone or with others. If she liked the beat, she recorded over it. She also ended up really liking the way I recorded and mixed her vocals, which led to me mixing songs as well.”

The album, SOS, was released in December 2022. Bisel engineered the album, mixed 10 songs, and co-produced 11 of the album's 23 tracks. He also co-wrote 15 songs, including the double-platinum single I Hate U and Kill Bill, which was the #1 song on the US Hot R&B/Hip Hop charts for 23 weeks, breaking the chart's record for weeks at #1. The album was #1 on the Billboard charts for ten weeks, and #1 on the R&B/Hip Hop for a record-breaking 41 weeks. Bisel hit #1 on the R&B producer chart in May 2023. In 2025, he won the Grammy Award for Best Progressive R&B Album for SOS and Best R&B Song for the track "Saturn."

== Personal life ==
Bisel lives in Los Angeles. His recording studio, Ponzu, is named after his dog.

=== Grammy Awards ===
Year	Nominee / work	Award	Result	Reference
2025	"Saturn" (SZA)	Best R&B Song	Won	
2024	SOS (SZA)	Album of the Year	Nominated	
2024	SOS	Best Progressive R&B Album	Won	
2024	"Kill Bill" (SZA)	Best R&B Performance	Nominated	
2024	"Kill Bill"	Record of the Year	Nominated	
2024	"Kill Bill"	Grammy Award for Song of the Year	Nominated	
2024	"Snooze" (SZA)	Best R&B Song	Won	
2024	"Ghost in the Machine" (SZA and Phoebe Bridgers)	Best Pop Duo/Group Recording	Won	
2024	"Low" (SZA)	Best Melodic Rap Performance	Nominated	
2024	Girls Night Out (Babyface)	Best R&B Album	Nominated	
2023	Mr. Morale & the Big Steppers (Kendrick Lamar)	Album of the Year	Nominated	
2023	"The Heart Part 5" (Kendrick Lamar song)	Record of the Year	Nominated	
2022	Planet Her (Doja Cat album)	Album of the Year	Nominated	
2022	"Kiss Me More" (Doja Cat song)	Record of the Year	Nominated	

== Selected discography ==
Year	Artist	Title	Credit	Notes	Ref(s)
2015	The Ruen Brothers	Point Dune	Mixing Assistant		
2016	DRAM	Big Baby D.R.A.M.	Engineer		
2016	Kanye West	The Life of Pablo	Production assistant		
2017	Eminem	Revival	Editor/assistant engineer		
2017	Neil Young & Promise of the Real	The Visitor	Assistant engineer		
2017	Jovanotti	Oh, Vita	Assistant engineer		
2017	Billy Corgan	Ogilala	Assistant engineer		
2017	Brent Faiyaz	Sonder Son	Engineer		
2017	Warbly Jets	Warbly Jets	Engineer		
2017	Sonder	Into	Mastering	EP	
2018	The Smashing Pumpkins	Shiny and Oh So Bright, Vol. 1 / LP: No Past. No Future. No Sun	Editor, assistant engineer, mixing assistant		
2018	Muse	Simulation Theory	Assistant engineer		
2018	Lady Gaga and Bradley Cooper	A Star Is Born (soundtrack)	Assistant engineer		
2018	The Ruen Brothers	All My Shades of Blue	Mixing assistant		
2018	Neil Young & Promise of the Real	Paradox (soundtrack)	Assistant engineer		
2018	Towkio	WWW.	Engineer/mixer		
2018	Garren Sean	End of the Night	Mixing, mastering		
2018	Brent Faiyaz	Make Luv	Engineer, mastering		
2018	Sonder	"One Night Only"	Mastering		
2019	JackBoys	JackBoys	Engineer		
2019	Harry Styles	Fine Line	Engineer		
2019	Neil Young & Crazy Horse	Colorado	Assistant engineer		
2019	Madison Ryann Ward	Beyond Me	Engineer		
2019	Daniel Caesar	Case Study 01	Engineer		
2019	Jovanotti	Jova Beach Party	Engineer		
2019	Tyler, The Creator	IGOR	Assistant engineer		
2019	Bakar	"Hell n Back"	Assistant engineer	Single	
2019	Kate Tempest	The Book of Traps and Lessons	Assistant engineer		
2019	Asante	sleek boy	Mastering	Remixes EP	
2019	Lukas Nelson & Promise of the Real	Turn Off The News (Build A Garden)	Assistant engineer		
2019	Mark Ronson	Late Night Feelings	Assistant engineer		
2019	Laundry Day	Homesick	Engineer		
2019	The Avett Brothers	Closer Than Together	Editor, assistant engineer		
2019	Santana	In Search Of Mona Lisa	Editor, assistant engineer	EP	
2020	SZA	"Good Days"	Vocal producer, engineer	Single	
2020	Megan Thee Stallion	Good News	Engineer		
2020	SZA	"Hit Different"	Songwriter, additional production, engineer		
2020	The Strokes	The New Abnormal	Assistant engineer		
2020	Lukas Nelson & Promise of the Real	Naked Garden	Assistant engineer		
2020	Louis Tomlinson	Walls	Engineer		
2021	SZA	"I Hate U"	Producer, songwriter, engineer mixing, mastering	Single	
2021	Jean Dawson	"Ghost""	Producer	Non-album single	
2021	SZA	"The Anonymous Ones"	Producer, engineer	Single	
2021	Kali Uchis	Sin Miedo (del Amor y Otros Demonios)	Engineer, mixing		
2021	James Blake	Friends That Break Your Heart	Engineer		
2021	Summer Walker	Still Over It	Engineer		
2021	Isaiah Rashad	The House Is Burning	Engineer, mixing		
2021	Various Artists	Space Jam: A New Legacy	Engineer	Soundtrack	
2021	Baird	"Beluga v2 (feat Berhana)"	Mixer, mastering	Single	
2021	Sonder and Jorja Smith	"Nobody But You"	Mixer, mastering	Single	
2021	Doja Cat	Planet Her	Engineer	Grammy-nominated for Album of the Year and Record of the Year (for "Kiss Me More")	
2021	Santana	Blessings and Miracles	Engineer		
2022	SZA	SOS	Producer, songwriter, engineer, mixer, guitar, keyboards		
2022	SZA	"Kill Bill"	Producer, writer, engineer, mixer	Single	
2022	Fousheé	Softcore	Producer		
2022	Chloe George	Penny	Producer	EP	
2022	Babyface	Girls Night Out	Producer, keyboards, drum programming		
2022	SZA	Ctrl	Mixer	Deluxe edition	
2022	ImaniCarolyn	Into the Blue Light	Mixer		
2022	Doechii	She / Her / Black Bitch	Engineer	EP	
2022	Kendrick Lamar	Mr. Morale & The Big Steppers	Assistant engineer	Grammy-nominated for Album of the Year	
2022	Kendrick Lamar	"The Heart Part 5"	Engineer	Grammy-nominated for Record of the Year	
2022	Baird	BIRDSONGS, Vol. 3	Mixer		
2023	Don Toliver	Love Sick	Producer		
2023	Reneé Rapp	"I Hate Boston"	Songwriter		
2023	Wallice	Mr. Big Shot	Producer		
2023	Tate McRae	Think Later	Bass, composer, drums, engineer, guitar, lyricist, synthesizer, producer		
2024	SZA	Apple Music Live	Composer, keyboards, lyricist, producer		
2025	Jennifer Lopez	"Birthday"	Co-writer, producer	Non-album single	
