= The Rum Diary =

The Rum Diary may refer to:

- The Rum Diary (novel), a novel by Hunter S. Thompson

- The Rum Diary (film), a 2011 film based on the novel, directed by Bruce Robinson and starring Johnny Depp

- The Rum Diary (band), a California-based indie rock band
