= Ghost in the Machine (song) =

2022 song by SZA featuring Phoebe Bridgers

Song by SZA featuring Phoebe Bridgers

from the album SOS
- Written: 2022
- Released: December 9, 2022
- Recorded: 2022
- Genre: Indie pop; R&B
- Length: 3:38
- Label: Top Dawg; RCA
- Songwriters: Solána Rowe; Rob Bisel; Carter Lang; Matt Cohn; Marshall Vore; Phoebe Bridgers
- Producers: Rob Bisel; Carter Lang

Lyric video
- "Ghost in the Machine" on YouTube

"Ghost in the Machine" is a song by the American singer-songwriter SZA from her second studio album, SOS (2022), featuring the American singer-songwriter Phoebe Bridgers. The song is a ballad that falls within the indie pop and R&B genres; music critics described it as a cross between Bridgers's and SZA's respective sounds. Written in a conversational style, the lyrics express disillusionment with inauthentic relationships, the inhumane behavior of other people, and artificial intelligence. They also portray SZA asking her lover to provide an escape from a world she sees as having been consumed by vanity.

The collaboration began with an online conversation between Bridgers and SZA; the two musicians rapidly completed the song a week before the album was scheduled for release. They co-wrote the song with Rob Bisel, Carter Lang, Matt Cohn, and Marshall Vore. Production and engineering duties were handled by Bisel, Lang, and Cohn.

"Ghost in the Machine" was Bridgers's first top-40 entry in the United States, peaking at number 40 on the Billboard Hot 100. It also appeared on the national charts in Australia, Canada, and Portugal. In reviews, critics primarily focused on Bridgers's appearance on the song; many praised the two performers as synergistic despite the differences between their musical styles, whereas a few were cynical toward Bridgers's inclusion. "Ghost in the Machine" won the Grammy Award for Best Pop Duo/Group Performance at the 2024 ceremony, giving Bridgers her first Grammy. SZA performed the song on multiple occasions during the SOS Tour, joined by Bridgers for two performances in March 2023.

== Background ==
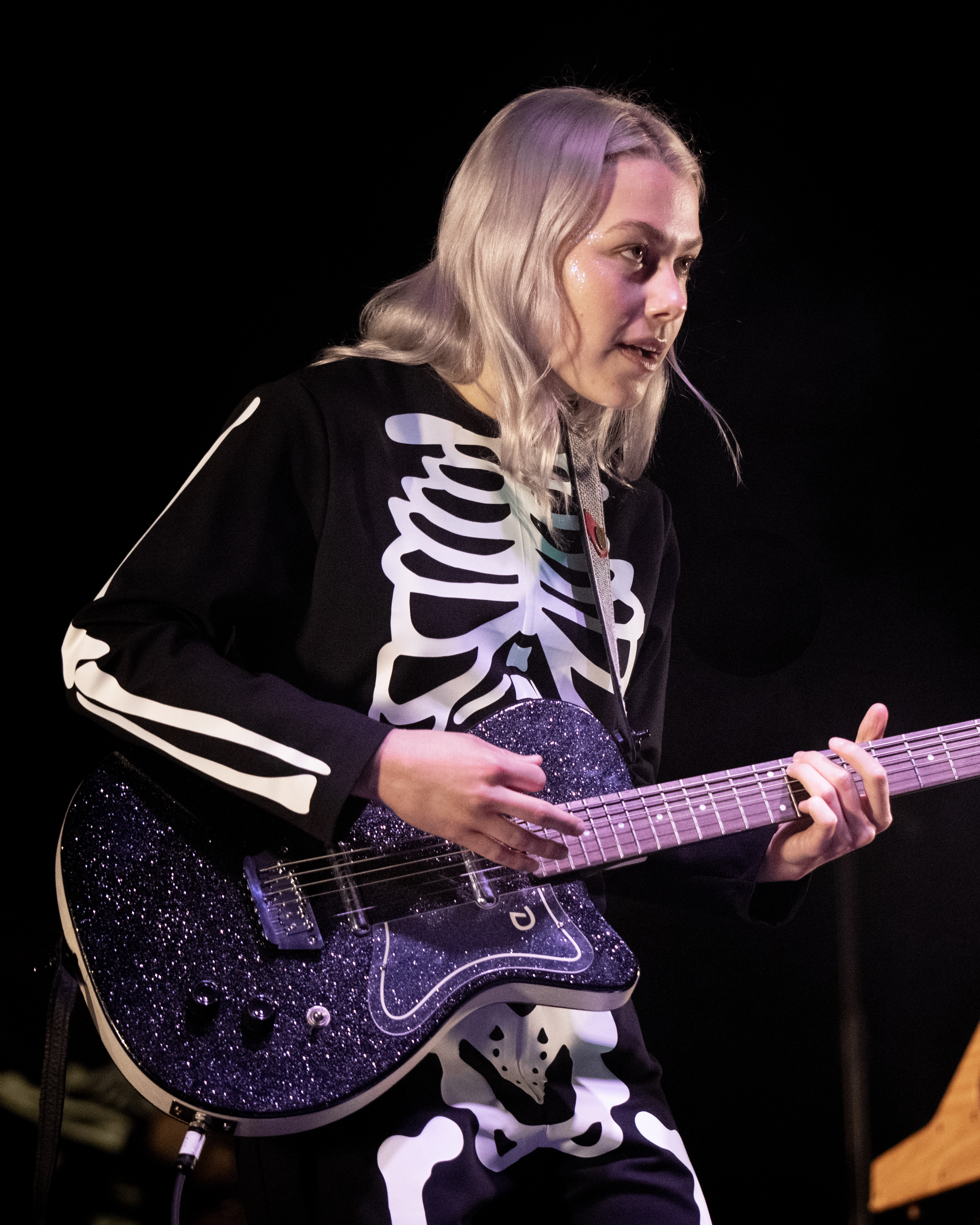
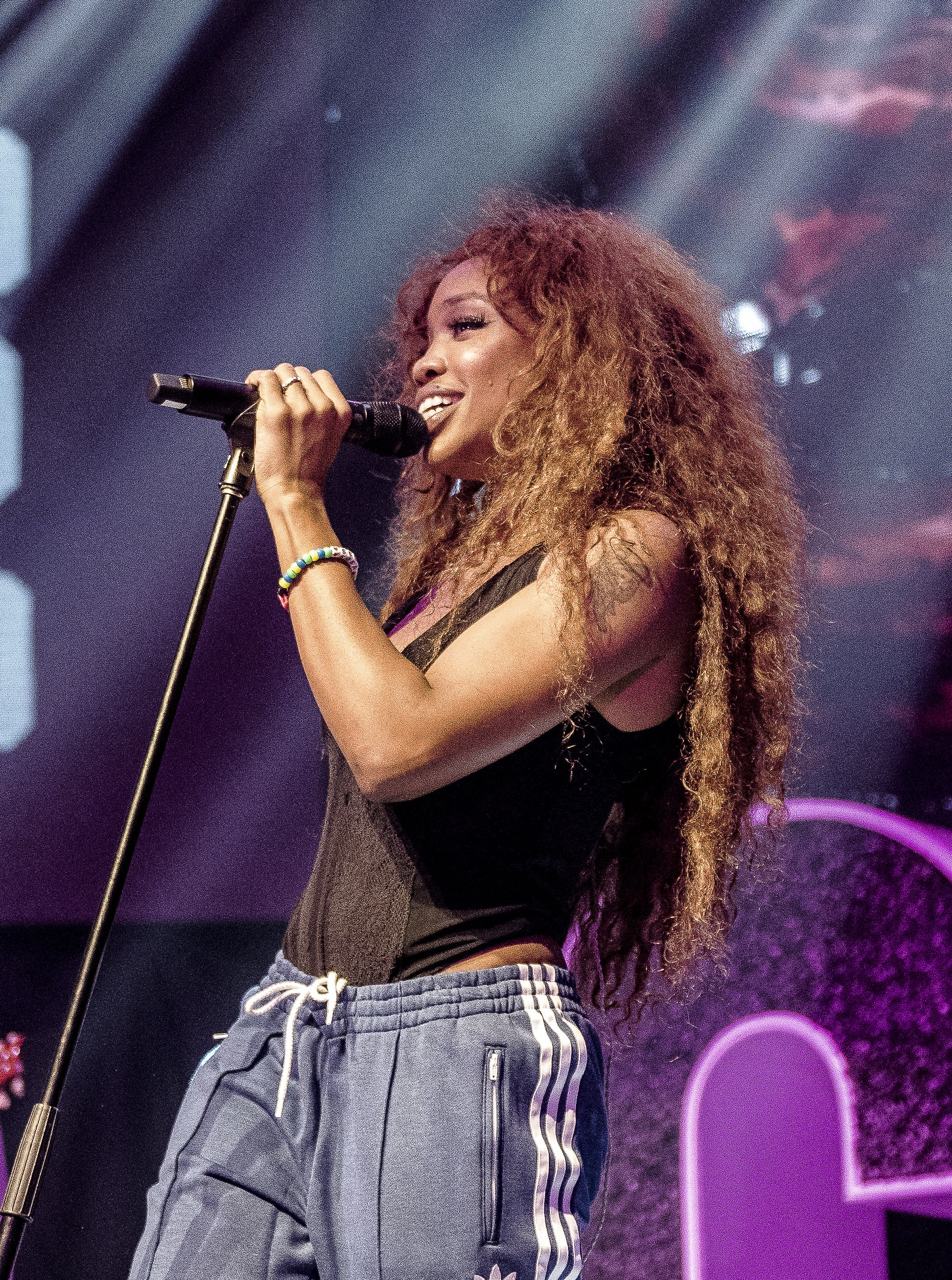
Phoebe Bridgers (left in 2021) collaborated with SZA (right in 2017) for "Ghost in the Machine".

SZA released her debut studio album, Ctrl, in 2017. Primarily an R&B album with lyrics that address facets of contemporary life and romance, it was commercially successful and received considerable acclaim. Critics credit it as innovative within the R&B genre and for establishing her as a major figure in contemporary pop and R&B music. (Note: Cited to The Line of Best Fit, NME, The Daily Telegraph, The New Yorker, and Consequence) Even so, she grew discontented with being classified as an R&B musician; she later stated that she felt like her music was being reductively categorized because she was a Black woman.

With her next studio album, SOS (2022), SZA imbued her established sound with elements from multiple genres. The album incorporates various disparate moods and musical styles: while some tracks had an aura that SZA described as "aggressive", others, such as "Ghost in the Machine", were balladic or soft. Reviewing the album, Kitty Empire of The Observer cited "Ghost in the Machine" as an example of SOS's versatility.

During the making of the album, SZA created a list of possible collaborators, including Billie Eilish, Harry Styles, Olivia Rodrigo, Doja Cat, Drake, and Kendrick Lamar. Of the artists she contacted, only three people responded: Don Toliver, Travis Scott, and Phoebe Bridgers. The first two appear on the tracks "Used" and "Open Arms", respectively, while Bridgers contributed vocals for "Ghost in the Machine".

== Music and production ==
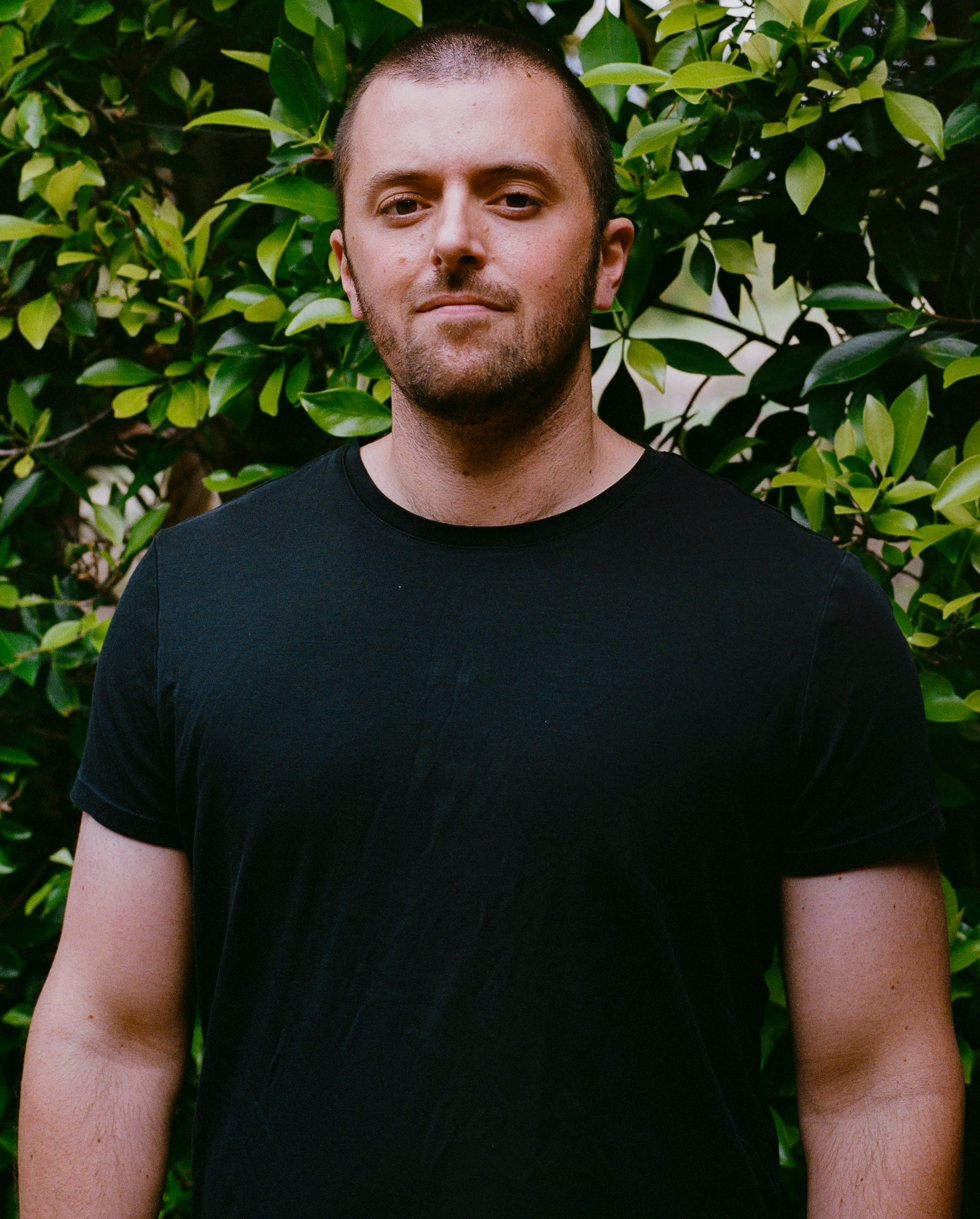
Producer Rob Bisel (pictured in 2023) conceived the song's melody while experimenting with a piano.

"Ghost in the Machine" is a ballad composed in a moderate tempo and primarily built on peaceful electronic production that switches to a piano backing during Bridgers's verse. In a review of SOS for Variety, A. D. Amorosi wrote that the production during SZA's verses evoked the plucking of banjos and bass guitars. Ken Tucker of NPR described SZA's vocals as "snak[ing] in and around the melody" and wrote that she "bends and breaks with hopelessness". SZA and Bridgers harmonize their voices to match each other's vocal timbres, and they deliver their verses breathily.

With regards to genre, SZA described "Ghost in the Machine" as "super alternative and strange", promising that it would defy listeners' preconceived notions about its sound. Alex Hopper of American Songwriter and Andrew R. Chow of Time described the song as an intersection between SZA's R&B style and Bridgers's alternative, indie pop style; Sidney Madden of NPR Music directly called the song "indie-pop angst". John Amen of Beats Per Minute wrote that its construction was rooted in "sad-girl pop".

The making of "Ghost in the Machine" began in 2022 with a drum loop produced by Matt Cohn, followed by piano and keyboard notes from Rob Bisel. The latter two instruments were acquired by Bisel within a week of "Ghost in the Machine" being written, and he stated that his work on the song was partly inspired by his experimentation with "new toy[s]". He conceived the song's main melody by taping together the strings inside the piano, diluting the impact of the hammers. Working with Carter Lang, Bisel then overhauled the "Ghost in the Machine" demo before showing it to SZA. Bisel thought Bridgers would fit in an open instrumental section during the middle of the demo, so he suggested to SZA that she include Bridgers as a feature. SZA agreed, having sought to include a "highly conversational" guest musician such as Bridgers on the song.

While Bisel was trying to arrange the feature through his publisher, SZA personally messaged Bridgers online in their first interaction together. The turnaround time for completing "Ghost in the Machine" was short; Bridgers came to the studio for sessions a week or two after being asked to feature, recording her vocals a week before the album's scheduled release. She at first wanted to provide background harmonies only, but she received encouragement from Bisel and the others to record a full verse. They liked her first take and kept most of it for the final song, although some parts were excised prior to the album's release.

== Lyrics ==
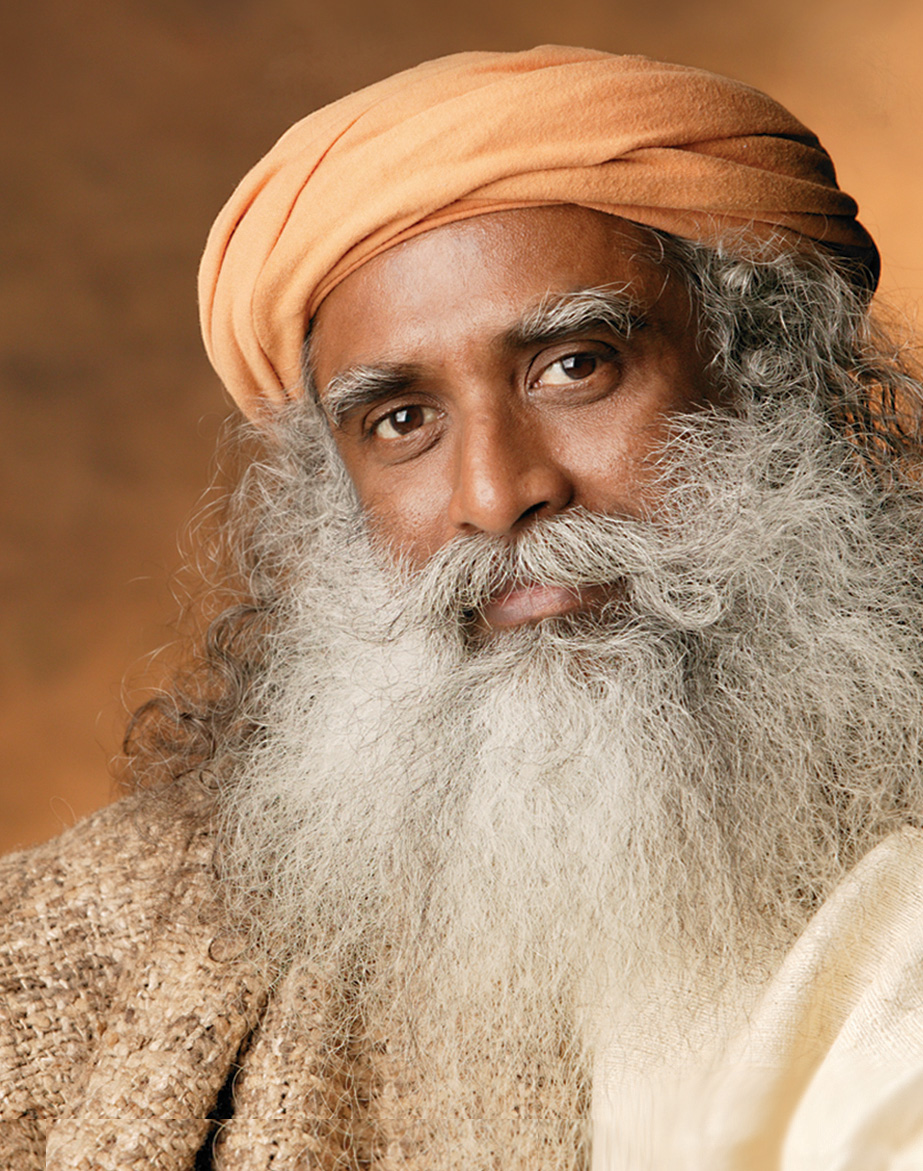
The outro samples a speech from Sadhguru (pictured in 2013) that ties into the song's message.

The making of SOS consisted of what SZA called "palate cleanser" moments, in which she would quickly write songs in between her more serious projects to refresh her mind; SZA took 20 to 30 minutes to write her verses for "Ghost in the Machine". The lyrics are written in a conversational style and primarily explore feelings of disillusionment, which come in part from SZA experiencing excessive negativity on the Internet. She was motivated to write the song out of exhaustion caused by the constant fighting between people on Internet spaces such as Instagram over morality, which she believed was at the expense of meaningful connections: "I feel like there's so much debate about what's good, what's bad, what's this, what's that?" SZA complements this theme by including a skit from Indian guru Sadhguru, who says in the outro that "those who have forsaken their humanity [...] like to patch their life with morality."

The song also discusses artificial intelligence; SZA blames it for her perceived lack of meaningful human connections in her life and, while "craving humanity", envies how robots have a future and do not feel tired, unlike her. American Songwriter's Thomas Galindo interpreted the line as showing anxiety about the growing influence of artificial intelligence within the music industry, whereas Nylon's Steffanee Wang wrote that SZA expressed a need to stop being treated like a machine by her job.

SZA turns to a lover for escapism and gratification, to assuage her disillusionment with modern relationships and distract her from an ambiguous disaster that Tucker thought could symbolize the end of either their romance or the world. Chow interpreted the relevant lyrics as showing SZA's desire to remain in a relationship despite feeling drained from it, and he wrote that this was a common theme in SOS. She sings in one line: "can you touch on me and not call me after? Can you hate on me and mask it with laughter?" SZA then invokes a reference to the Bible, one of many such instances on SOS, asking the lover to take her to Noah's Ark and give her the password.

Bridgers's verse begins with the lyric, "You said all of my friends are on my payroll / You're not wrong, you're an asshole", which Alexis Petridis of The Guardian wrote was evocative of "tension clearly compounded by fame and success". She sings about the Ludlow Hotel in New York City, where she finds herself in arguments with a romantic partner, and about being alone in a non-descript airport bar. The lyrics were interpreted by publications as alluding to her breakup with Irish actor Paul Mescal.

== Release ==
In November 2022, SZA revealed the album title to be SOS and said it would be released on an unspecified date the following month; "Ghost in the Machine" appears on the album as the 12th track out of 23. After three years of delays, SOS was released through Top Dawg Entertainment and RCA Records on December 9, 2022.

"Ghost in the Machine" entered several record charts after the release of SOS. It debuted and peaked at number 40 on the Billboard Hot 100, becoming Bridgers's first top-40 song in the United States. On the same publication's Hot R&B/Hip-Hop Songs, the song debuted and peaked at number 17; Billboard ranked the song at number 65 on the chart's year-end tally for 2023. "Ghost in the Machine" also appeared on the national charts in Canada, Australia, and Portugal. (Note: Cited to the Australian Recording Industry Association, Billboard, and Associação Fonográfica Portuguesa; see the charts section for the exact peaks) On the Billboard Global 200, it reached number 52.

== Critical reception ==
Critics primarily focused on whether SZA and Bridgers were a congruent pairing; several praised the collaboration as successful despite the two artists' different musical styles. Chow wrote that "Ghost in the Machine" was the best collaboration on SOS, reasoning that the feature was bound to work because the two musicians' discographies overlap significantly in terms of subject matter, which prevented an "awkward" genre crossover for Bridgers: "it has often felt like the two of them are anxious, horny Spider-Men pointing at each other from across the genre-verse." Shaad D'Souza of The Saturday Paper complimented the collaboration as a "smart match" between "Bridgers' ultraliteral indie-folk" and "SZA's wide-eyed earnestness". Others commented that the sound, while unexpected in the context of the album, was nonetheless cohesive. (Note: Cited to the Associated Press, NME, NPR, and Good Morning America)

There were some critics less appreciative of the lyrical themes and Bridgers's presence. Rolling Stone's Will Dukes considered the exploration of artificial intelligence a contrived effort, akin to a "Black Mirror trope about the AI Art Generator". CJ Thorpe-Tracey of The Quietus felt that Bridgers appeared only to give SZA a "magic indie countercultural 'good for business' aura", adding that his annoyance was compounded by how she had had too many guest appearances on others' albums within the same year. Paul Attard for Slant Magazine also found the feature unnecessary, and felt that the indietronica backing was one of the album's missteps with regards to genre experimentation.

At the 2024 Grammy Awards, SZA received nine nominations for her work on SOS and its tracks, including one for "Ghost in the Machine". She was the most nominated artist for the year. The song won the Best Pop Duo/Group Performance award, which gave Bridgers her first Grammy; with three additional wins as a member of Boygenius, she was the most awarded artist in the ceremony.

== Live performances ==
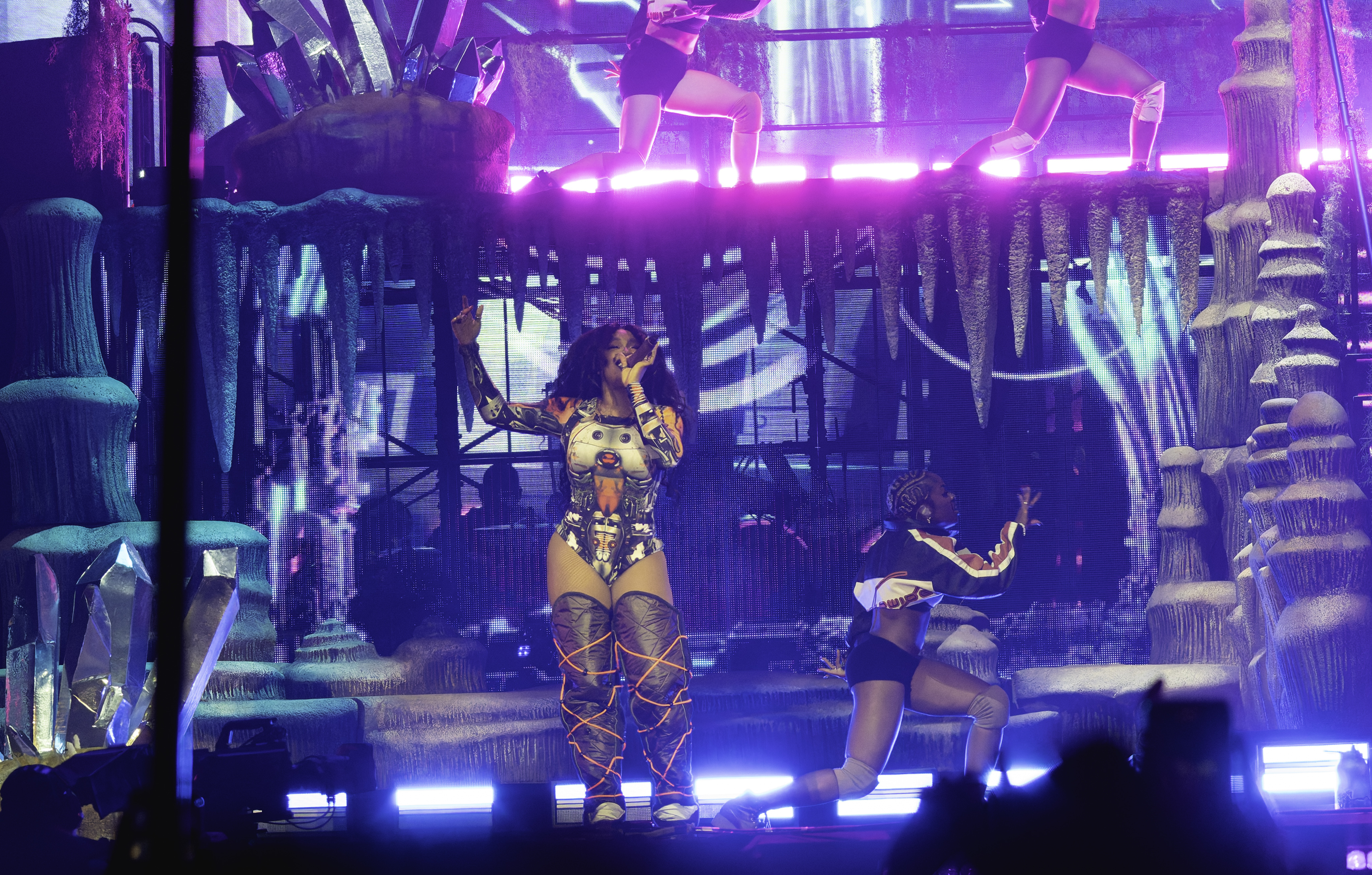
The middle section of SZA's Glastonbury 2024 set, where she performed "Ghost in the Machine"

SZA performed "Ghost in the Machine" live for the first time on March 4, 2023, at Madison Square Garden in New York City as part of the international SOS Tour. Bridgers appeared as a surprise guest, joining SZA to perform her verse. The two duetted the song again during the last show of the tour's first leg, on March 23 at Inglewood's Kia Forum.

In between the two concerts with Bridgers, SZA played the song solo on March 16 at Seattle's Climate Pledge Arena. She continued to sporadically incorporate the song into her setlists during the tour, including at a June 13 concert at Manchester's AO Arena, a September 26 concert at Philadelphia's Wells Fargo Arena, and a September 30 concert at Boston's TD Garden. SZA also included "Ghost in the Machine" on her headlining set for Glastonbury 2024, held on June 30.

== Credits ==
Adapted from the liner notes of SOS

Recording and management

- Engineered at Westlake Barn, and Studios A and D (Los Angeles, California)
- Bridgers's vocals engineered at Sound City Studios (Van Nuys, California)
- Mixed at Ponzu Studios (Los Angeles, California)
- Mastered at Becker Mastering (Pasadena, California)
- Published by Songs of Universal Inc./TDE Publishing LLC/Solána Rowe Publishing Designee (BMI), Sony Songs/Bisel Creative Sound (BMI), Carter Lang Publishing Designee/Zuma Tuna LLC/Warner-Tamerlane Publishing Corp. (BMI) (all rights adm. by Warner-Tamerlane Publishing Corp.), MSCSONGS/No Idle/Universal Music Corporation (ASCAP), Pizza Money Publishing (ASCAP) (adm. by Kobalt Songs Music Publishing), and Whatever Mom (ASCAP) (adm. by Kobalt Songs Music Publishing)

Personnel

- Solána Rowe (SZA) – songwriting
- Rob Bisel – songwriting, production, keyboards, drums, piano, choir, engineering, mixing
- Carter Lang – songwriting, production, keyboards, drums, piano, choir
- Matt Cohn – songwriting, additional production, drums
- Marshall Vore – songwriting
- Phoebe Bridgers (Note: Appears courtesy of Dead Oceans) – songwriting
- Sadhguru – skit
- Hayden Duncan – assistant engineering
- Syd Tagle – assistant engineering
- Robert N. Johnson – assistant engineering
- Tony Berg – vocal production (for Bridgers)
- Ethan Gruska – vocal production (for Bridgers)
- Will Maclellan – vocal engineering (for Bridgers)
- Dale Becker – mastering
- Katie Harvey – assistant mastering
- Noah McCorkle – assistant mastering

== Charts ==
=== Weekly charts ===
Weekly chart performance for "Ghost in the Machine"
Chart (2022)	Peak position
Australia (ARIA)	72
Canada Hot 100 (Billboard)	46
Global 200 (Billboard)	52
Portugal (AFP)	121
UK Audio Streaming (OCC)	96
US Billboard Hot 100	40
US Hot R&B/Hip-Hop Songs (Billboard)	17

=== Year-end charts ===
Year-end chart performance for "Ghost in the Machine"
Chart (2023)	Position
US Hot R&B/Hip-Hop Songs (Billboard)	65

== Certifications ==
Certifications for "Ghost in the Machine"
Region	Certification	Certified units/sales
Brazil (Pro-Música Brasil)	Gold	20,000^{‡}
Canada (Music Canada)	Platinum	80,000^{‡}
New Zealand (RMNZ)	Gold	15,000^{‡}
United Kingdom (BPI)	Silver	200,000^{‡}
United States (RIAA)	Platinum	1,000,000^{‡}
^{‡} Sales+streaming figures based on certification alone.
