= A New Hope (Minipop album) =

Studio album by Minipop
- Released: November 7, 2007
- Recorded: 2006
- Genre: Indie pop, Dream pop, Alternative Rock
- Length: 35:37
- Label: Take Root Records
- Producer: Chris Manning

Professional ratings
Review scores
Source	Rating
IGN	7.6/10

A New Hope is the first studio album by American Indie pop band Minipop, released in 2007.

== Critical reception ==
Spin wrote that the band "deliver methodical, echoing, swoon-worthy numbers that display their brainiac tendencies." The East Bay Express wrote that Minipop is "at its best on songs like 'Ask Me a Question,' where conventional pop spills over its walls like a river cresting a levee." CMJ New Music Monthly stated that "the album's snappy dream pop and spacious songs never get old, fade or become dull."

== Track listing ==
No.	Title	Length
1.	"Like I Do"	3:33
2.	"Someone to Love"	3:43
3.	"Ask Me A Question"	3:50
4.	"Generator"	3:49
5.	"Precious"	3:34
6.	"Wearing Thin"	4:51
7.	"Fingerprints"	2:45
8.	"Butterflies"	2:32
9.	"My Little Bee"	3:08
10.	"A New Hope"	4:25
