= Future Farmer Records =

Future Farmer Records is an independent record label based in San Francisco, California.

Inspired by skateboarding culture, Future Farmer was founded in 1996 by San Joaquin Valley natives Jeff Klindt and Dennis Mitchell.

Former label member M. Ward remains the label's biggest commercial success to date.

== Artists ==
- Built Like Alaska
- Cub County
- David Dondero
- For Stars
- Fuck
- Nik Freitas
- Ghosty
- Granfaloon Bus
- The Heavenly States
- The High Violets
- Jackpot
- Jet By Day
- Joaquina
- Kevin Salem
- Matt Keating
- The Minders
- Yuji Oniki
- Righteous Boy
- The High Strung
- Virgil Shaw
- M. Ward
- Wonderlick

== See also ==
- List of record labels
