= Treasure Island Music Festival =

American annual music festival

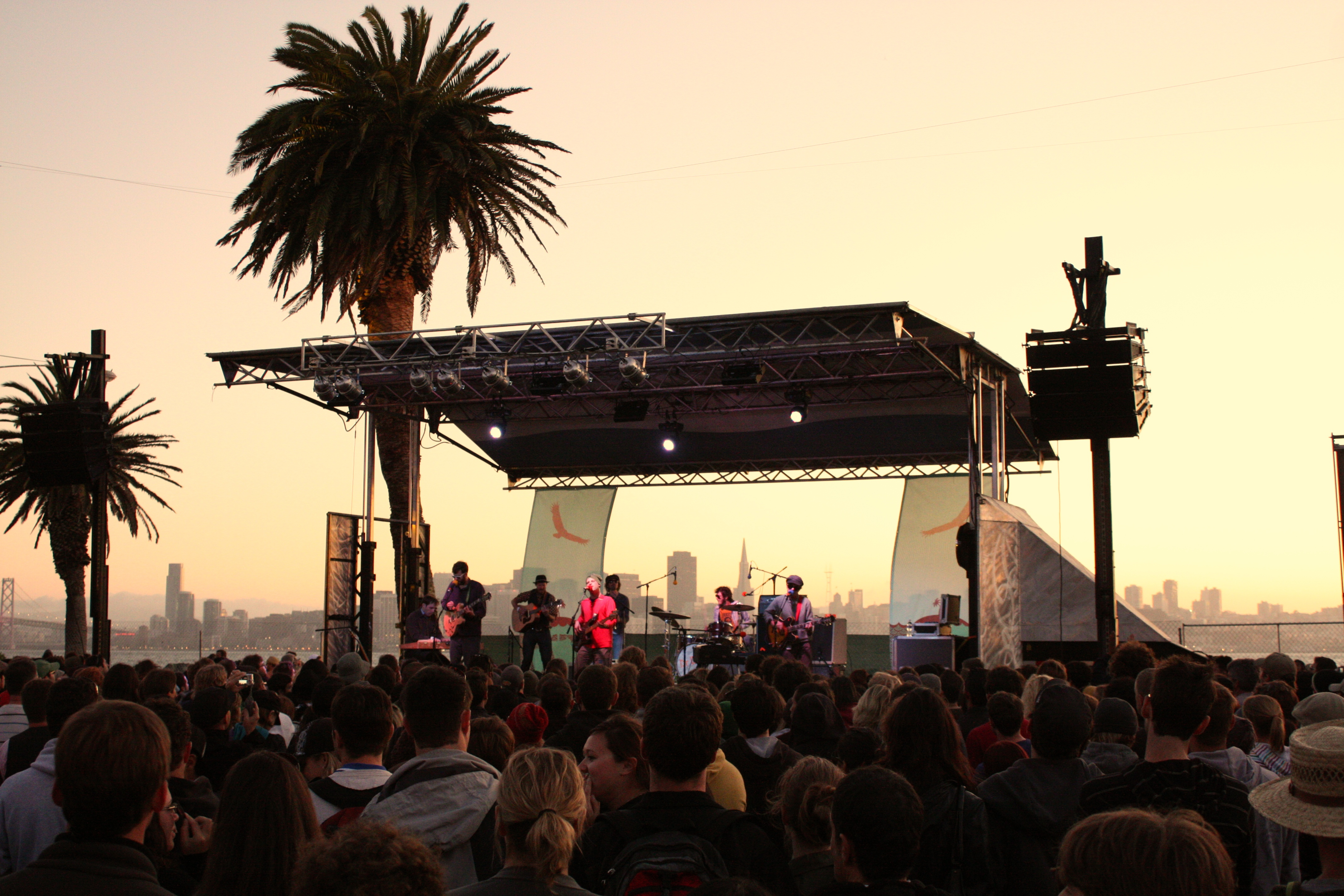
- Genre: Electronic music, electronica and hip hop/rap rock and indie rock
- Dates: October 13–14, 2018
- Locations: Treasure Island, California; Middle Harbor Shoreline Park
- Years active: 2007–2016, 2018
- Founders: Noise Pop; Another Planet Entertainment
- Website: Official website

Treasure Island Music Festival is an annual two-day music festival. Prior to 2018, the festival took place on Treasure Island, California, located in the San Francisco Bay. In 2018, the festival moved to Middle Harbor Shoreline Park, located in Oakland. The festival is produced by Noise Pop and Another Planet Entertainment (APE) .

The first day of the festival consists of electronica and hip hop/rap influenced performers while the second day consists of rock and indie rock influenced performers. Each day the sets are split between two separate, nearby stages, however, the performances are staggered such that attendees can listen to every performer. Typically, the northernmost stage is the main stage on which the headliner plays.

Parking on the island was limited and as such, each year the majority of private vehicles were left in the parking lot at AT&T Park or Bill Graham Auditorium, depending on the year, and a shuttle service was provided to the island. The organizers also claim this reduces traffic congestion on the island. The Treasure Island Music Festival has also been noted for its emphasis on reducing carbon emissions: organizers provide zero emission bus services to the island from the city of San Francisco and emphasize the use of composting.

This festival has been on hiatus since 2019.

== 2018 Lineup ==
=== Day 1: October 13 ===
- A$AP Rocky
- Silk City (Diplo + Mark Ronson)
- Santigold
- Pusha T
- Aminé
- Hiatus Kaiyote
- Laff Trax (Toro y Moi x Nosaj Thing)
- Moses Sumney
- Polo & Pan
- George Fitzgerald (LIVE)
- JPEGMAFIA
- Gilligan Moss

=== Day 2: October 14 ===
- Tame Impala
- Lord Huron
- Courtney Barnett
- Jungle
- Sharon Van Etten
- Cigarettes After Sex
- U.S. Girls
- Alex Cameron
- Soccer Mommy
- Pond
- Shame
- serpentwithfeet

== 2016 Lineup ==
=== Day 1: October 15 ===
- Ice Cube
- ZHU
- Glass Animals
- Duke Dumont—cancelled due to unsafe playing conditions
- Young Thug
- Flight Facilities—cancelled due to unsafe playing conditions
- The Polish Ambassador—played extended set.
- Mura Masa
- How to Dress Well— played a shortened set due to flight delays.
- Honne
- Sofi Tukker
- Kamaiyah—played twice.
- DJ Worthy

=== Day 2: October 16 ===
- Sigur Ros
- James Blake—cancelled and performed a free show the following night.
- Purity Ring
- Tycho—played a DJ set in addition to live performance.
- Mac DeMarco
- Sylvan Esso
- Neon Indian
- Christine and the Queens
- Wild Nothing
- Deafheaven
- Car Seat Headrest
- Hinds
- Day Wave

== 2015 Lineup ==
=== Day 1: October 17 ===
- deadmau5
- FKA twigs
- Big Grams (Big Boi and Phantogram)
- STS9
- Run The Jewels
- Gorgon City
- Hudson Mohawke
- Cashmere Cat
- Viceroy
- Shamir
- Bob Moses
- Skylar Spence
- Baio

=== Day 2: October 18 ===
- The National
- CHVRCHES
- The War On Drugs
- Father John Misty
- Panda Bear
- Jose Gonzalez
- Deerhunter
- Drive Like Jehu
- Ex Hex
- Mikal Cronin
- Lower Dens
- Viet Cong
- Ought

== 2014 Lineup ==
=== Day 1: October 18 ===
- Outkast
- Zedd
- Janelle Monáe
- St. Lucia
- Jungle
- MØ
- Classixx
- Ryan Hemsworth
- Ana Tijoux
- XXYYXX
- Ratking
- Tobacco
- Painted Palms

=== Day 2: October 19 ===
- Massive Attack
- alt-J
- TV on the Radio
- The New Pornographers
- Washed Out
- Banks
- Poliça
- The Growlers
- Chet Faker
- Ásgeir
- Bleached
- Cathedrals

== 2013 Lineup ==
=== Day 1: October 19 ===
- Atoms for Peace
- Major Lazer
- Little Dragon
- Phantogram
- Disclosure
- Holy Ghost!
- Danny Brown
- DJ Falcon
- Poolside
- Adult.
- Robert DeLong
- Giraffage
- Antwon

=== Day 2: October 20 ===
- Beck
- Animal Collective
- James Blake
- Sleigh Bells
- STRFKR
- Lord Huron
- Japandroids
- Real Estate
- Haim
- Palma Violets
- Cayucas
- IO Echo
- Deep Sea Diver

== 2012 Lineup ==
=== Day 1: October 13 ===
- Girl Talk
- The Presets
- Porter Robinson
- Public Enemy
- SBTRKT
- Tycho
- AraabMuzik
- Matthew Dear
- Toro y Moi
- Grimes
- The Coup
- K.Flay
- Dirty Ghosts

=== Day 2: October 14 ===
- The xx
- M83
- Gossip
- Best Coast
- Joanna Newsom
- Divine Fits
- Youth Lagoon
- Los Campesinos!
- The War on Drugs
- Ty Segall
- Hospitality
- Imperial Teen
- The Neighbourhood

== 2011 Lineup ==
=== Day 1: October 15 ===
- Empire of the Sun
- Cut Copy
- Chromeo
- Death From Above 1979
- Battles
- Dizzee Rascal
- Flying Lotus
- Yacht
- The Naked & Famous
- Aloe Blacc
- Shabazz Palaces
- Buraka Som Sistema
- Geographer

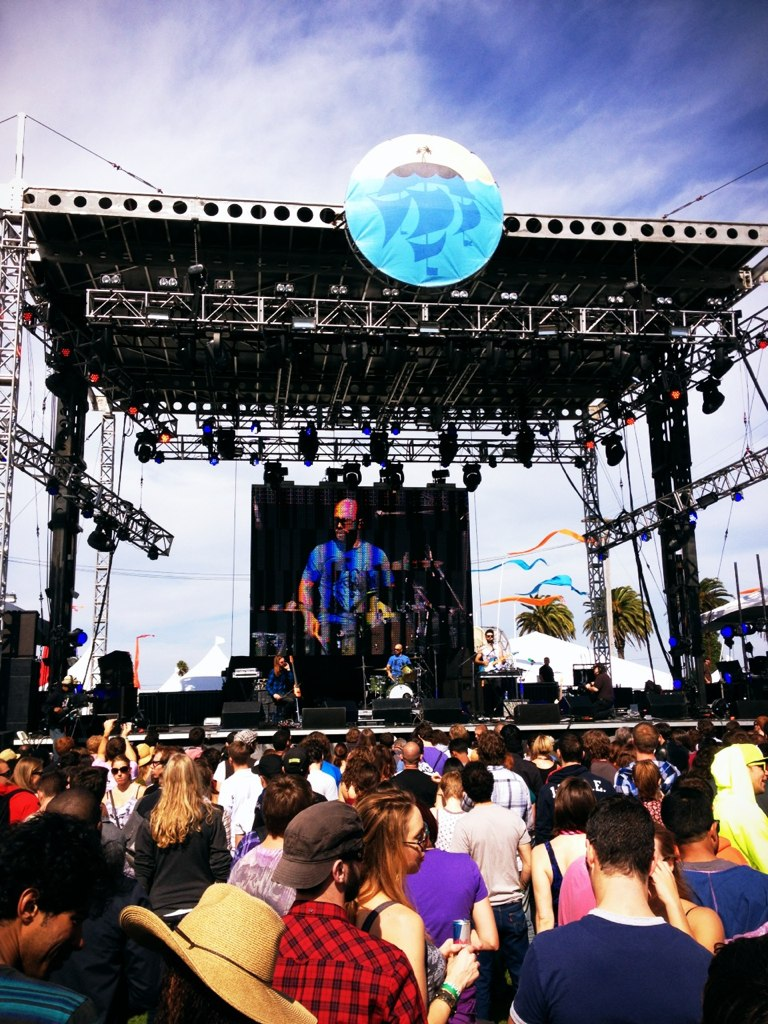
Geographer (2011) at Treasure Island Music Festival

=== Day 2: October 16 ===
- Death Cab For Cutie
- Explosions In The Sky
- Beach House
- The Hold Steady
- The Head and the Heart
- St. Vincent
- Stephen Malkmus and the Jicks
- Friendly Fires
- Wild Beasts
- Warpaint
- The Antlers
- Thee Oh Sees
- Weekend

== 2010 Lineup ==
=== Day 1: October 16 ===
- LCD Soundsystem
- Deadmau5
- Kruder & Dorfmeister (Live set)
- Miike Snow
- !!!
- Die Antwoord
- Little Dragon
- Four Tet
- Holy Fuck
- Phantogram
- Jamaica
- Wallpaper
- Maus Haus

=== Day 2: October 17 ===
- Belle & Sebastian
- The National
- Broken Social Scene
- She & Him
- Superchunk
- Rogue Wave
- Surfer Blood
- Ra Ra Riot
- Monotonix
- The Sea and Cake
- Phosphorescent
- Papercuts
- The Mumlers

== 2009 Lineup ==
=== Day 1: October 17 ===
- MGMT
- MSTRKRFT
- Girl Talk
- Brazilian Girls
- The Streets
- Passion Pit
- LTJ Bukem Feat. MC Conrad
- DJ Krush
- Federico Aubele
- Dan Deacon
- Murs
- Crown City Rockers
- The Limousines

=== Day 2: October 18 ===
- The Flaming Lips
- The Decemberists
- Beirut
- Grizzly Bear
- Yo La Tengo
- The Walkmen
- Bob Mould
- Thao with The Get Down Stay Down
- Vetiver
- Spiral Stairs
- Sleepy Sun
- Tommy Guerrero
- Edward Sharpe and the Magnetic Zeros

== 2008 Lineup ==
=== Day 1: September 20 ===
- Justice
- TV On The Radio
- Goldfrapp
- Hot Chip
- Cansei de Ser Sexy
- Antibalas
- Aesop Rock
- Amon Tobin
- Foals
- Mike Relm
- Nortec Collective
- Loquat
- Chester French
- The Frail

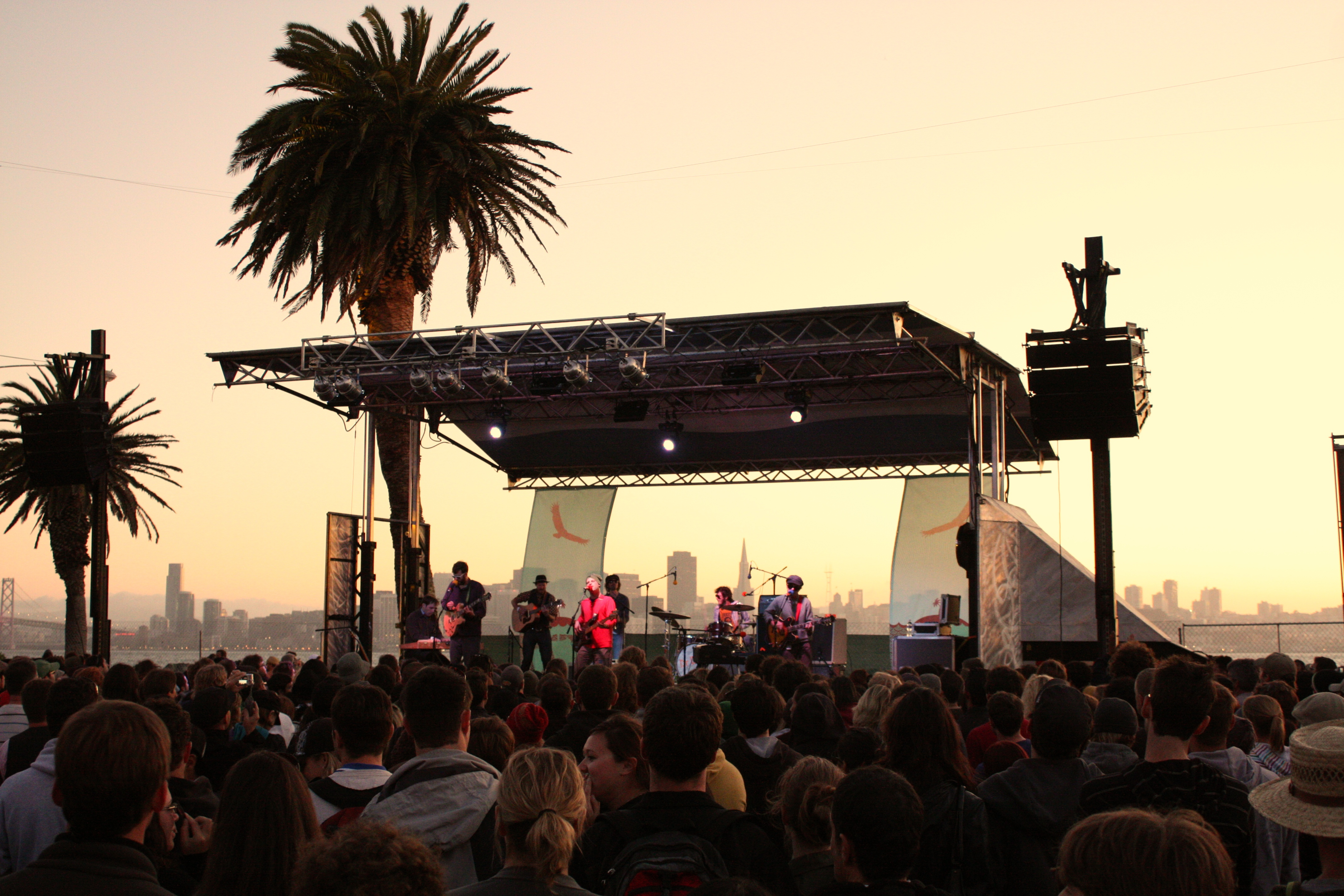
Dr. Dog Performing at the 2008 Treasure Island Festival

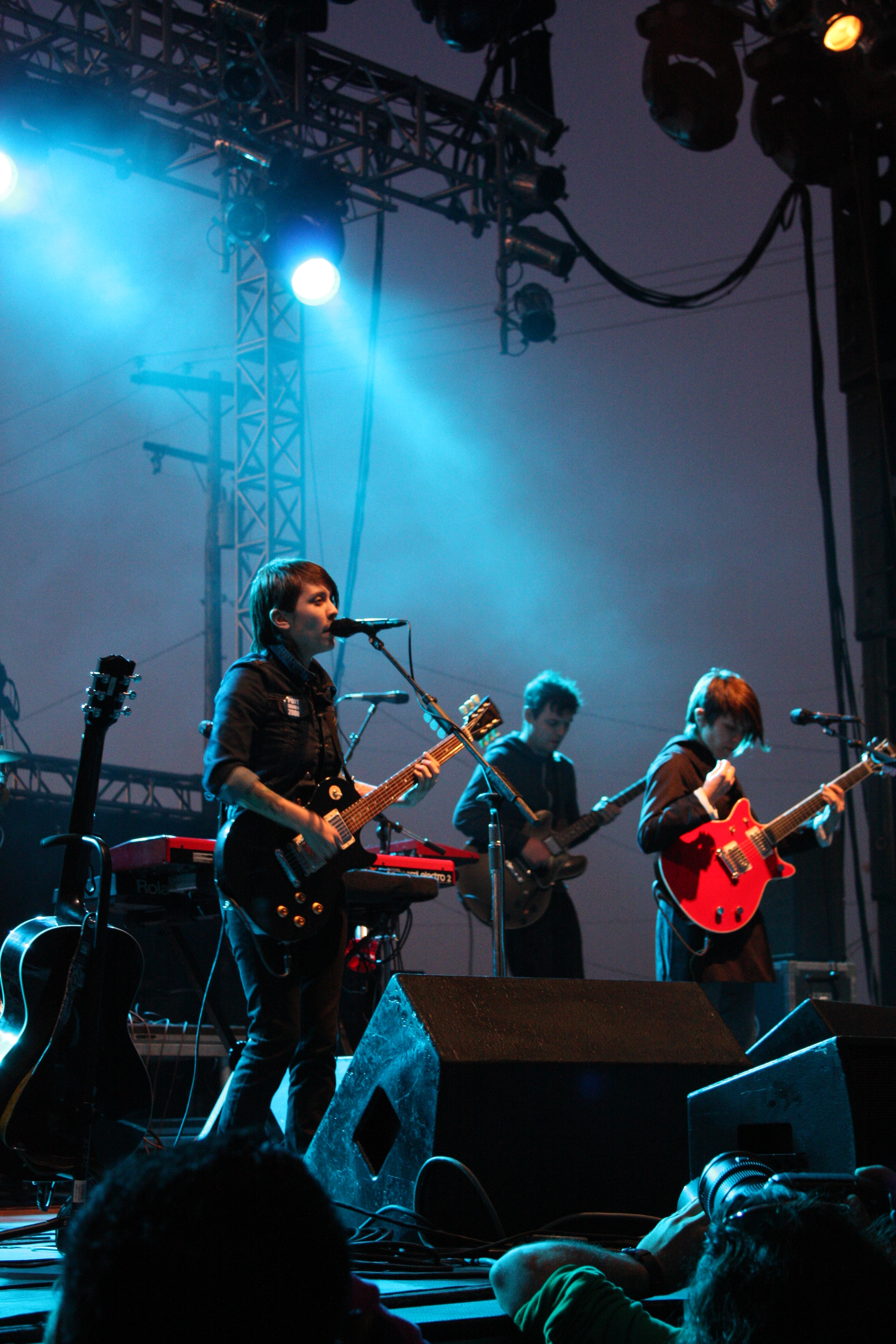
Tegan and Sara Performing at the 2008 Treasure Island Festival

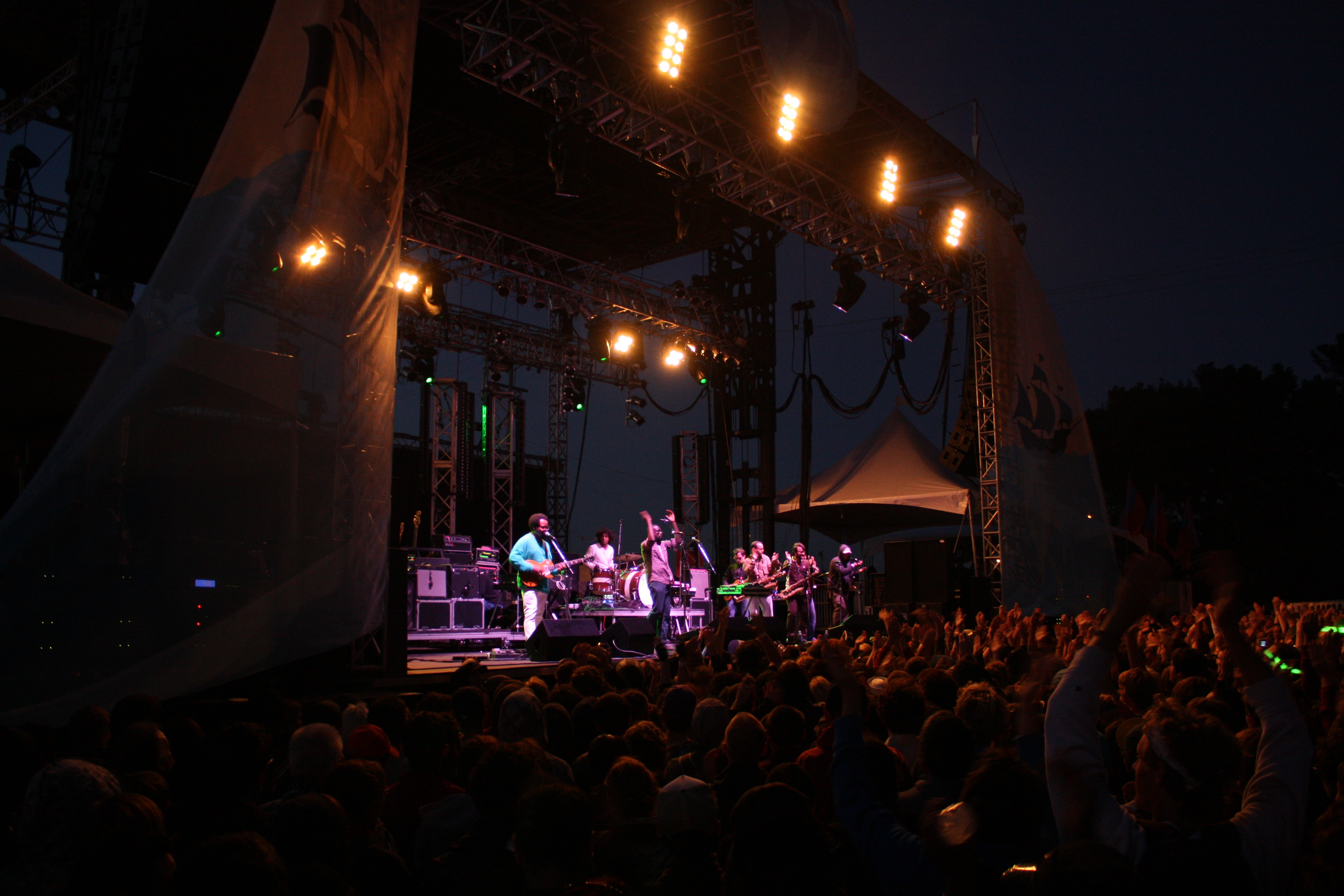
TV on the Radio Performing at the 2008 Treasure Island Festival

=== Day 2: September 21 ===
- The Raconteurs
- Tegan and Sara
- Vampire Weekend
- Spiritualized
- Okkervil River
- Tokyo Police Club
- The Kills
- Dr. Dog
- John Vanderslice
- The Dodos
- Fleet Foxes
- The Morning Benders
- Port O'Brien
- Or The Whale

== 2007 Lineup ==
=== Day 1: September 15 ===
- Thievery Corporation
- Gotan Project
- DJ Shadow
- Cut Chemist
- M.I.A.
- Ghostland Observatory
- Kinky
- Zion I
- Kid Beyond
- Dengue Fever
- West Indian Girl
- Mocean Worker
- Honeycut.

=== Day 2: September 16 ===
- Modest Mouse
- Spoon
- Built to Spill
- Clap Your Hands Say Yeah
- M. Ward
- Two Gallants
- Earlimart
- Au Revoir Simone
- Film School
- The Devil Makes Three
- Sea Wolf
- Street to Nowhere
- Trainwreck Riders

== See also ==
- Coachella Valley Music and Arts Festival
- Bonnaroo Music Festival
- Outside Lands Music and Arts Festival
- List of electronic music festivals
