= Noise Pop =

Music promoter in California, US

Noise Pop Industries
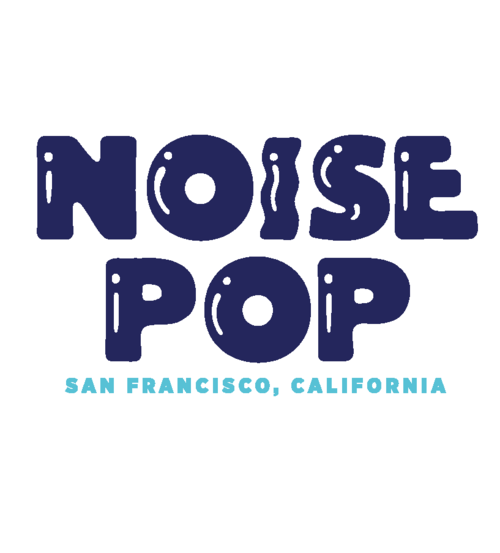
- Noise Pop 2017 logo
- Industry: Music promotion
- Genre: Rock, indie, hip hop, electronic dance music
- Founded: 1993
- Headquarters: San Francisco Bay Area
- Website: noisepop.com

Noise Pop is an independent music promoter founded in San Francisco in 1993. The Noise Pop Festival, organized by Noise Pop, has showcased a variety of artists including The White Stripes, Modest Mouse, Death Cab for Cutie, The Flaming Lips, The Shins, Fleet Foxes, Bright Eyes, and Yoko Ono.

Noise Pop collaborates in producing the Treasure Island Music Festival. Originating in 2007, this outdoor festival was initially located in the middle of the San Francisco Bay, and has featured artists such as Outkast, Beck, Atoms for Peace, LCD Soundsystem, Deadmau5, Public Enemy, and The National. It typically drew 18,000 attendees per day. In 2018, the festival relocated to Middle Harbor Shoreline Park in Oakland.

Noise Pop serves as the talent buyer for San Francisco venues Swedish American Hall and Cafe du Nord. They also organize the 20th Street Block Party.

Furthermore, Noise Pop partners with various organizations, venues, and institutions to host events, including the SFMOMA, California Sunday Magazine, and the California Academy of Sciences.

== Festivals ==
=== Noise Pop Festival ===
The Noise Pop Festival debuted in 1993 as a "5 bands for 5 dollars show" at the Kennel Club (now the Independent). Initially a one-day event, it has since evolved into a week-long festival across multiple Bay Area venues.

=== Treasure Island Music Festival ===
In 2007, Noise Pop collaborated with Bay Area promoter Another Planet Entertainment to launch the first annual Treasure Island Music Festival. The inaugural edition, headlined by Modest Mouse and Thievery Corporation, was held on Treasure Island off the coast of San Francisco until 2016. Since 2018, the festival has been situated at Middle Harbor Shoreline Park in Oakland.

The festival typically showcases indie and electronic music, with past headliners including Outkast, LCD Soundsystem, The National, Beck, and The xx. It features attractions such as a ferris wheel and art exhibits, with no overlapping sets.

== Subsidiaries and venues ==
=== DoTheBay ===
Acquired by Noise Pop in 2012, DoTheBay is an entertainment website based in the San Francisco Bay Area that provides information about upcoming events. DoTheBay is part of the DoStuff Network, which consists of 14 culture and event guides across North America. DoStuff Media was founded in Austin, Texas, in 2006.

=== Swedish American Music Hall and Cafe du Nord ===
In December 2014, Noise Pop announced the reopening of the Swedish American Music Hall and assumed responsibility for live event curation. Since then, they have hosted artists such as Tokimonsta, The Mountain Goats, and Kero Kero Bonito.

In May 2017, Cafe du Nord reopened as a music venue, featuring an opening night performance by Rogue Wave on June 1, 2017.
