= The Day I Turned to Glass =

Studio album by Honeycut
- Released: September 26, 2006
- Recorded: 2006
- Genre: Electronic/Soul/Funk
- Length: 44:40
- Label: Quannum

Professional ratings
Review scores
Source	Rating
Allmusic	4/5 stars

The Day I Turned to Glass is Honeycut's debut full-length album. Released on September 26, 2006, the album contains twelve tracks spanning roughly 45 minutes.

The album is noted for having a track used twice in Apple's promo materials: Exodus Honey was first featured in a commercial for the newly redesigned aluminum iMac in summer 2007, and later that year in the welcome video that plays on first launch of Mac OS X Leopard (the same video made its way to Snow Leopard in 2009, after which Apple stopped including intro videos in its operating systems). This album is one of two Honeycut studio albums.

== Track listing ==
1. The Day I Turned to Glass - 3:39
2. Tough Kid - 3:23
3. Shadows - 3:38
4. Butter Room - 4:46
5. Dysfunctional - 4:04
6. Dark Days, White Lines - 3:38
7. Polaroid Lullaby - 1:43
8. Silky - 4:13
9. Aluminum City - 2:05
10. Crowded Avenue - 4:58
11. Exodus Honey - 4:22
12. Fallen to Greed - 4:11
