= Pretty...Slow =

Studio album by Fuck
- Released: 1996
- Genre: Indie rock
- Label: Rhesus

Fuck chronology
Fuck (1994)	Pretty...Slow (1996)	Baby Loves a Funny Bunny (1996)

Pretty...Slow is an album by the American indie rock band Fuck, and their first to see wide release. It was released by their own label, Rhesus Records, in 1996, and contains new material as well as songs originally released on their first album, the cassette Fuck.

Pretty...Slow was reissued by Smells Like Records in 2016.

== Production ==
The album was recorded at Black Eyed Pig Recording Studio, in San Francisco. It was originally released in a limited edition cardboard packaging, with a coloring book and games.

== Critical reception ==
Professional ratings
Review scores
Source	Rating
AllMusic	3/5 stars

AllMusic wrote that "most of the tracks are off-kilter ballads played on dimly recorded acoustic guitars or clicking electrics with bass and light percussion."

== Track listing ==
1. Wrongy Wrong
2. I Am Your King
3. Hide Face
4. In the Corner
5. From Heaven
6. One Eye out the Door
7. Monkey Does His Thing
8. Pretty Pretty
9. Shotgun (H)ours
