= A Crescent Honeymoon =

EP by Communiqué
- Released: 2002
- Genre: Indie rock
- Length: 23:51
- Label: Lookout!
- Producer: Communiqué

Communiqué chronology
A Crescent Honeymoon (2002)	Poison Arrows (2004)

Professional ratings
Review scores
Source	Rating
Allmusic	3/5 stars

A Crescent Honeymoon is the first EP by San Francisco indie rock band Communiqué.

== Track listing ==
No.	Title	Length
1.	"Cross Your Heart"	2:55
2.	"Ugly Moon"	4:02
3.	"Love Unconditional"	4:29
4.	"Evening in the Sky"	3:37
5.	"Drummer Boy"	4:10
6.	"Annabelle"	4:38
