= Poison Arrows =

Studio album by Communiqué
- Released: June 8, 2004
- Recorded: 2003–2004
- Genre: Indie rock
- Length: 39:42
- Label: Lookout

Communiqué chronology
A Crescent Honeymoon (2003)	Poison Arrows (2004)	Walk into the Light (2006)

Professional ratings
Review scores
Source	Rating
AllMusic	3/5 stars

Poison Arrows is the first full-length album by San Francisco indie rock band Communiqué.

== Track listing ==
1. "The Best Lies" – 2:29
2. "Evaporate" – 3:30
3. "Ouija Me" – 2:58
4. "Dagger Vision" – 3:32
5. "Perfect Weapon" – 3:16
6. "Black Curses" – 3:38
7. "Strays" – 4:04
8. "My Bay" – 4:38
9. "Death Rattle Dance" – 3:56
10. "Rattling Bones" – 7:41
