= Communiqué (band) =

American indie rock band

Communiqué was a 2000s indie rock band from the San Francisco Bay Area. The band originated as American Steel, but decided to record under the name Communiqué after their third album because their new poppy indie rock sound did not match the punk style of American Steel. Their first release as Communiqué was the 2003 EP titled A Crescent Honeymoon. In 2004, they released their debut album Poison Arrows. In 2007, the Communiqué name was discontinued, with the members becoming American Steel again.

== Band members ==
- Rory Daniel Henderson - vocals/guitar
- Ryan Massey - guitar/vocals
- John Kincaid Peck - electric bass
- Jamie Kissinger - drums
- Steve Loewinsohn - keyboards
- Cory Gowan - keyboards
- Cary LaScala - touring drummer

== Discography ==
=== Albums ===
- Poison Arrows (2004, Lookout! Records)

=== Singles & EPs ===
- A Crescent Honeymoon (2002, Lookout! Records)
- Roses Are Black (2005, Lookout! Records)
- Walk Into The Light (2006, Sabot Productions)

=== Music videos ===
- "Cross Your Heart"
- "Perfect Weapon"

== Other appearances ==
- Lookout! Freakout Episode 3 (2003, Lookout! Records)
- Playing 4 Square 3 (2003, Suburban Home Records)
- The Cornerstone Player 041 (2003, Cornerstone Promotion)
- The Cornerstone Player 048 (2003, Cornerstone Promotion)
- The Cornerstone Player 051 (2004, Cornerstone Promotion)
- Second-Hand Suit Jacket Racket (2004, Lookout! Records)
- Take Action! Vol 4 (2004, Sub City Records)
- Sumosonic 30 (2004, Heavy)
- Spin College Radio Fall 2004 - Volume 10 (2004, Spin)
- Protect: A Benefit For The National Association To Protect Children (2005, Fat Wreck Chords)
- This Is My Bag (2005, Lookout! Records)
- The Norcal Compilation 2005 (2005, Agent Records)
- Video Archive For The Ages, Volume 1 (2005, Amp Magazine)
- Songs From The Bigtop (A Film By Devon Reed) (2007)
- Special Label Sampler (Fabtone Records)
