= Built Like Alaska =

Indie rock band from USA

- Origin: Oakdale, California, USA
- Genres: Indie rock, Americana
- Years active: 1997-
- Labels: Sweat of the Alps, Future Farmer, Way Grimace Records
- Members: Neil Jackson : Vocals, guitar, piano Davey Burtch : Drums; Sean Norman : guitar, keyboard Ken Michaels : bass
- Past members: Doug Rice : keyboard (1997-1999); Matt Candelario : Bass Guitar (1997-2007); Anthany Rossi : Bass Guitar (2010-2012); Chris Doud : Guitar (2001-2004); Susane Reis : Piano/Keyboard, Guitar, Percussion (2001-2008); Joshua Barragan : keyboard (2010-2011); Jacob Canada : bass guitar (2011-2012)
- Website: http://www.builtlikealaska.bandcamp.com

Built Like Alaska is an indie rock band from Oakdale, California, USA. Forming shortly after Jackson's return to Oakdale from Humboldt State University in 1996, the band began playing local dives, dumps and police bars as a three-piece outfit. Signing with Grandaddy's Sweat of the Alps label, they released their début full-length, Hopalong, in 2003. They attracted the attention of a larger indie label, Future Farmer, who released album number two, Autumnland, and re-released Hopalong, both in 2005. Also in 2005, the band provided the score for Scott Coffey's film Ellie Parker and spent a good deal of the summer touring the U.S. In 2011 Built Like Alaska released their 3rd album In Troubled Times... on now defunct Future Farmer (re-released 2019 on Way Grimace Records). 2020 brings the release of a long-awaited 4th record entitled Apartments on Way Grimace Records. After 20 years in the making and many failed attempts at completing the record, it seems that the 11 song album will tell the stories of the residents of a ramshackle apartment complex in which Jackson used to work at as an on site "fix it man".

== Discography ==
=== Albums and EPs ===
- This Song Will Bury You (2000, self-released)
- Hopalong (2003, Sweat of the Alps; 2005, Future Farmer)
- Pamphlets and Films EP (2003, self-released)
- Autumnland (2005, Sweat of the Alps/Future Farmer)
- Don't Mess With X-Mas (2010, self-released)
- In Troubled Times (2011, Future Farmer)
- The Coldest Carnie's Heart (2019, self-released)
- Apartments (January 2020, Way Grimace Records)

=== Compilation appearances ===
- If You Rearrange the Letters It Spells Satan (1997) (song: "Visions Of Teela")
- Sleeping Off Stolen Dreams (2001, Little Echoes) (song: "Ain't No Bridgegroom")
- Portraits: 32 Singers, 32 Songs (2010, Off the Air) (song: "Red Eye")

== Reviews ==
- Autumnland in PopMatters
- Autumland in Stylus Magazine
- In Troubled Times... in The Aquarian
