= The Band Ice Cream =

US musical group

- Also known as: Icey, TBIC, Ice Cream
- Origin: San Francisco, California, United States
- Genres: garage rock; punk rock
- Years active: 2014–present
- Label: Urban Scandal Records
- Members: Kevin Fielding; Dante Johnson; Dahlia Amade; Clayton Silva
- Website: thebandicecream.com

The Band Ice Cream is an American/Canadian garage rock band from San Francisco, California.

== History ==
The Band Ice Cream formed in San Francisco, California in 2015 as "Ice Cream" consisting of Kevin Fielding (Toronto), Joseph Sample (Grand Rapids), Dylan Murray and Raphael DiDonato. Their first EP We're Set was recorded by Mike Carnahan and released on January 15, 2015. Songs "Wild" and "Surfer Girl" from the EP earned the band praise both locally in the Bay Area and nationally with The Deli Magazine listing We're Set in their 10 Best Bay Area Albums of 2015.

== Classically Trained (2017) ==
In December 2016 the group signed to Urban Scandal Records as The Band Ice Cream, started working with producer Bruce Botnick and released their debut full-length album Classically Trained on March 10, 2017. Singles "Jerk It Off", "Sand Dunes" and "Mexico" premiered on Consequence of Sound, PunkNews and SF Weekly respectively.

== Numbskull (2018) ==
As recording began on this album, Rappoport left the group and was replaced by Dante Johnson. Recorded with Jack Shirley in East Palo Alto. "Numbskull" was released on August 17, 2018.

== PLAY DEAD (2022) ==
The third studio album by The Band Ice Cream. Tracked by Jack Shirley at Atomic Garden Oakland. Produced by Timothy Vickers a.k.a. Grandbankss.

== Discography ==
- Classically Trained (2017)
- Numbskull (2018)
- PLAY DEAD (2022)
