= Fuck (band) =

American indie rock band

- Origin: Oakland, California
- Genres: Indie rock; lo-fi; noise pop
- Years active: 1993–present
- Labels: Several labels in past, including Matador Records, Jagjaguwar
- Members: Timothy Prudhomme; Geoff Soule; Kyle Statham; Theodore Ellison

Fuck is an American indie rock band, formed in Oakland, California in 1993. It consists of Timothy Prudhomme, Geoff Soule, Kyle Statham and Theodore Ellison. They have recorded for a number of labels including Matador Records and Homesleep Records of Italy.

== History ==
Fuck was formed in Oakland, California in 1993. The members met while stuck in a police holding cell over the weekend, and wrote a few songs while in jail. They released a self-titled cassette called Fuck, and a single, MonkeyBeautyShotgun on their own imprint, Rhesus Records, in 1994. (The songs from the cassette would eventually find their way onto later releases.) They released their second full-length album, Pretty...Slow, in 1996. It was subsequently released on three different labels. Their third album, Baby Loves a Funny Bunny, was also released in 1996.

They then signed to Matador Records, who released the albums Pardon My French in 1997 and Conduct in 1998. According to Timothy Prudhomme, a Matador marketing director told them that they needed to change the band's name, but they refused.

After Conduct, the band left Matador and drifted between labels. In 2001, they released two albums on two different labels: Cupid's Cactus, on Steve Shelley's independent label Smells Like Records; and Gold Bricks, on Homesleep Records in 2001. Those Are Not My Bongos was released in 2003 on both Homesleep and Future Farmer Records; the latter re released it the U.S. in 2004.

The song "Laundry Shop" from Conduct was featured (uncredited) in a 2006 episode of the CBS sitcom How I Met Your Mother.

In November 2008, the band participated with other similarly named bands, including Holy Fuck, Fucked Up, and Fuck Buttons in the Festival of the Fuck Bands music festival in the village of Fucking, Austria.

In 2018, Fuck released The Band, their first LP in 14 years.

To date, Fuck has performed over 400 live shows and recorded on nine labels. Prudhomme currently lives in Memphis and the rest of the band lives in the San Francisco Bay Area.

== Discography ==
=== Albums ===
- Fuck (cassette) – Rhesus – 1994
- Pretty...Slow (CD) – Rhesus – 1996
- Baby Loves a Funny Bunny (CD) – Rhesus – 1996
- Pardon My French (CD) – Matador – 1997
- Conduct (LP/CD) – Matador – 1998
- Cupid's Cactus (CD) – Smells Like Records – 2001
- Gold Bricks (CD) – Homesleep Records – 2001
- Those Are Not My Bongos (CD) – Homesleep Records – 2003
- The Band (LP/CD) - Vampire Blues - 2018

=== Singles and EPs ===
- "MonkeyBeautyShotgun" (7") – Rhesus – 1994
- "LikeyouButterflySomewheres" (7") – Rhesus – 1995
- "Fish or Fry" (7") – Academy of Chess and Checkers – 1996
- "TetherFuckmotel" (7") – Jagjaguwar – 1997
- Split 7" w/ Tocotronic (7") – Rhesus – 1998
- "Moxie" (7") – Rhesus – 1998
- "Yuppie Flu" (7") – Rhesus – 1999
- "BlindbeautyMadeup" (7") – Speakerphone Recordings – 1999
- "Mumble and Peg" (7") – Vaccination Records – 1999
- Split with Pee – Cool Beans Records – 2000
- "Homesleep Singles Club No. 4" (CD) – Homesleep Records – 2003
