= Minipop =

American electronic music band

- Origin: Oakland, California, United States
- Genres: Indie; Pop; Dream Pop; Alternative Rock
- Years active: 2004-Present
- Label: Take Root Records
- Members: Tricia Kanne; Lauren Grubb; Matthew Swanson
- Past members: Nick Forte; Jon Warran; Lia Rose

Minipop is an American-based Indie electronic and dream pop band formed in 2004 in Oakland, California. The band consists of Tricia Kanne (vocals/guitar), Lauren Grubb (drums), Matthew Swanson (guitar/keyboard) and Nick Forte (bass).

The band garnered much popularity and attention when they self-produced their first EP, Precious EP in 2006.

The band is signed to Take Root Records, an independent record label. Their debut record with the label, A New Hope, was released on November 7, 2007.

== Discography ==
=== Studio albums ===
- A New Hope (2007)

=== EPs ===
- Precious EP (2006)
- Automatic Love EP (2010)
- Chances EP (2014)

== See also ==
- Hazel English
- Ghostly Kisses
- Still Corners
