= Hindu Pirates =

- Origin: Huntington Beach, California, U.S.
- Genres: Rock music
- Years active: 2009–present
- Members: Austin Ferreira; Ben Tinsley; Derek Bostelman; Giussepe LoBasso

Hindu Pirates, a rock band from Huntington Beach, California, formed in 2009 and currently consists of Austin Ferreira on lead vocals, Casey Snyder on lead guitar, Ben Tinsley on drums, Derek Bostelman on bass, and Giussepe LoBasso on rhythm guitar. The group came together during their high school career at Edison High School (Huntington Beach, California). In 2010, the band release their first self produced album Pelican Daze. In 2012, the band was sponsored by the clothing brand, Hurley to produce their EP, Hurley EP. The band has played at numerous local venues such as the Constellation Room in Orange County. The Echo in Echo Park, and at the US Open of Surfing in 2012. Hindu Pirates have opened for bands like Grouplove, Delta Spirit, Tijuana Panthers and Cold War Kids. They've also performed with bands such as Los Angeles-based Santoros, El Segundo's Froth, San Francisco's Cool Ghouls, Allah-Las, Har Mar Superstar, JJMAZ, Gantez Warrior
