= The Rum Diary (band) =

American indie rock band

The Rum Diary is a California-based indie rock band. Its members include Daniel McKenzie, Jon Fee, Joe Ryckebosh, and Schuyler Feekes.

== History ==
The band formed in Cotati, California in 2000. Since then, the group has released one EP, three 7-inch singles and three full-length albums. All members of the band play multiple instruments; Daniel McKenzie, Jon Fee, Schuyler Feekes, and Joe Ryckebosch. McKenzie and Fee are the primary songwriters.

Since 2007, the band was put on hiatus while Fee and McKenzie started a new project with Jake Krohn, Shuteye Unison. McKenzie also creates solo music under the name Identical Homes. Fee also creates music with his son, Charlie Fee, under the name The Things of Youth.Fee also runs the indie-eco music label Parks and Records.

The band's name comes from the novel of the same name by Hunter S. Thompson. Their music is heavily influenced by noise rock.

== Discography ==
- Noise Prints CD (Substandard Records, 2002)
- A Key To Slow TimeCD (Springman Records, 2002)
- Mileage 2 Song 7-inch Record on Colored Vinyl (Springman Records, 2002)
- Poisons That Save Lives CD (Substandard Records, 2003)
- Poisons That Save Lives 12-inch Record on Gold Vinyl (Substandard Records, 2003)
- Desert City Soundtrack and The Rum Diary 2 song split 7-inch Record (Springman Records, 2003)
- Split with Kilowatthours CD (Springman Records, 2005)
- Back in the Hardcore Days 2 Song 7-inch Record (Devil in the Woods, 2006)
- We're Afraid of Heights Tonight 12-inch Record (Devil in the Woods, 2006)
- We're Afraid of Heights Tonight CD (Devil in the Woods, 2006)
- North v. South 4-way split 7-inch Record (Springman, 2007)
