= Honeycut =

American electro-funk band

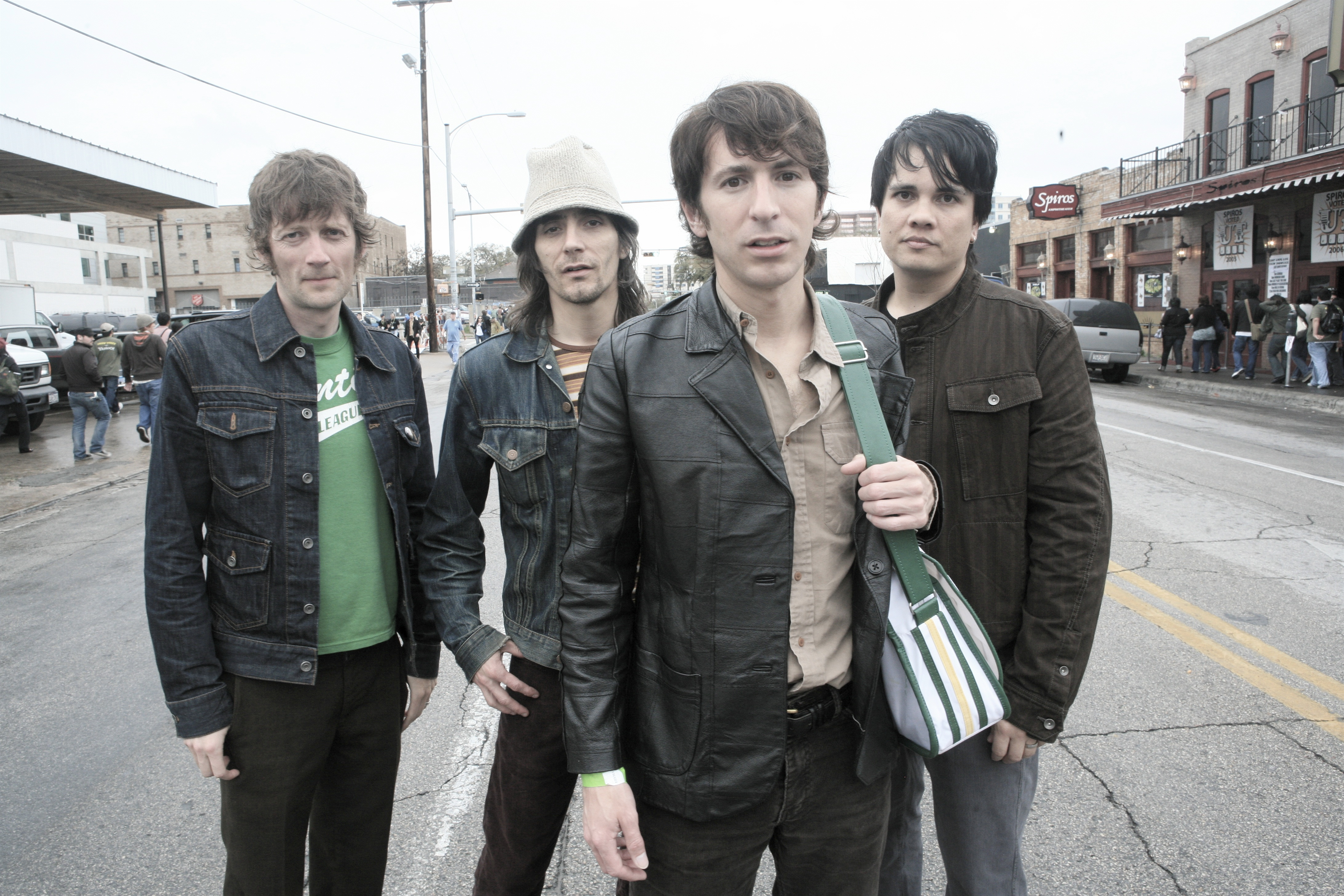

Background information
- Origin: Bay Area, San Francisco, California, United States
- Genre: Electro-funk
- Years active: 2003–present
- Label: Quannum Projects
- Members: Bart Davenport; RV Salters; Tony Sevener

Honeycut is a San Francisco–based band, part of the Quannum Projects. Its members are Bart Davenport (voice), RV Salters (keys and samples) and Tony Sevener (beats, MPC drum machine). The band was formed in 2003. It released its first album in 2006 (The Day I Turned to Glass) and shortly after received the 17th annual SF Weekly music award in the category Best Soul/Funk Band. Its music has been influenced by rock, indie-pop, soul and funk and their sound is very rich for a three-man band.

Bart Davenport and Tony Sevener originate from California, while RV Salters was born in Paris and lived in France until joining the Quannum Projects in 1999. RV Salters displays a unique style of dancing while playing keyboard during their performances. They mostly perform in the San Francisco Bay Area, for example at notable places like The Independent.

A cut-down version of Honeycut's song "Exodus Honey" released in 2006 was used by Apple for the late-2007 iMac commercial and the welcome video that plays upon installation of both Mac OS X Leopard and its successor Mac OS X Snow Leopard.

== Discography ==
Albums

- The Day I Turned to Glass (2006)
- Comedians (Europe) (2011)
- Comedians (US) (2012)
