= Warbly Jets =

American rock band

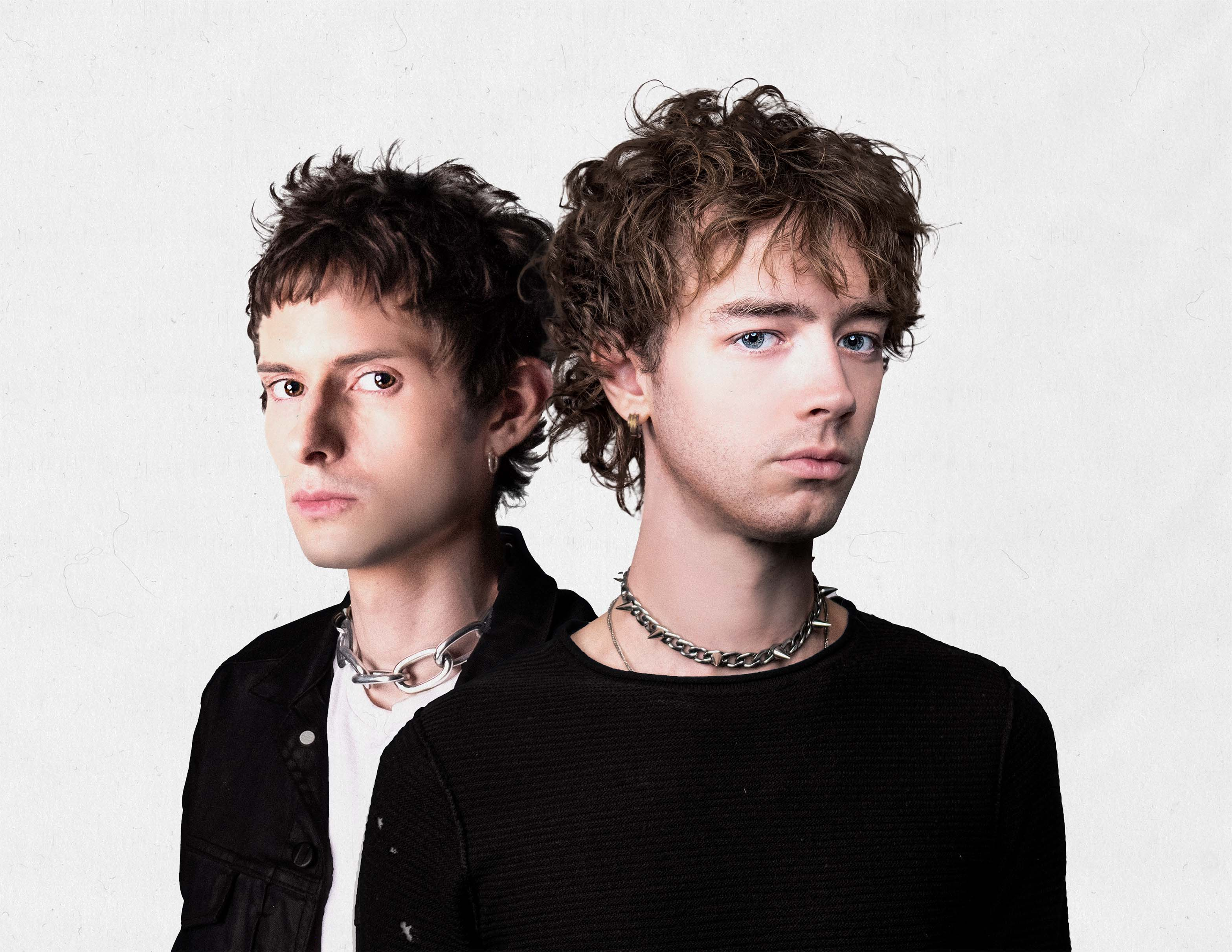
- Julien O'Neill (left) and Samuel Shea (right)

Background information
- Origin: Los Angeles, California, U.S.
- Genres: Alternative rock; experimental rock; indie
- Years active: 2015–present
- Members: Samuel Shea; Julien O'Neill
- Past members: Dan Gerbang; Justin Goings; Samuel Hess; Ethan Snyder; Stevie Campos; Joey Schneider; Paul Joseph Waxman; Jared Walker; Aric Bohn
- Website: warblyjets.com

Warbly Jets is an American music duo formed in 2015 in Los Angeles. The group consists of founding members Samuel Shea (vocals, instruments) and Julien O'Neill (synthesizers, instruments) and has a rotating cast of touring and in-studio members. The group's self-titled debut album was released in late 2017.

== History ==
Shea and O'Neill first met while living in Brooklyn, NY. and soon moved to Los Angeles, CA to write and record demos in early 2015.

In 2017, they released their debut studio album under the name Warbly Jets. Self-produced, recorded, and released, songs from the album such as "Alive," "Fast Change," and "The Lowdown" have been used in numerous video games and television series such as Spider-Man, Need for Speed Payback, and Lucifer.

In late 2017, Warbly Jets made their US television debut appearing on NBC's Last Call with Carson Daly.

They have done multiple international tours as an independent band and have toured as support acts alongside artists such as Liam Gallagher, The Dandy Warhols, Stone Temple Pilots and Rival Sons.

In 2019, they released a three-song EP entitled Propaganda.

On August 26, 2021, Warbly Jets announced their second studio album, Monsterhouse, due out November 12, 2021, by Rebel Union Recordings.

== Discography ==
Studio Albums

- Warbly Jets (2017)
- Monsterhouse (2021)

EP

- Propaganda (2019)

Singles

- "Alive" (2016)
- "The Lowdown" (2017)
- "4th Coming Bomb" (2017)
- "Shapeshifter" (2017)
- "Ride" (2017)
- "Raw Evolution" (2017)
- "Between the Lines" (2018)
- "Inhuman Emotion" (2018)
- "Propaganda" (2019)
- "NASA" (2020)
- "LowResolution" (2021)
- "TMI" (2021)
