= Purple Mountains (album) =

Studio album by Purple Mountains
- Released: July 12, 2019
- Recorded: 2018
- Studios: Jamdek, Chicago, Illinois; Thump, Brooklyn, New York
- Genres: Indie rock; country
- Length: 44:21
- Label: Drag City
- Producers: Jarvis Taveniere; Jeremy Earl

Singles from Purple Mountains
- 1. "All My Happiness Is Gone" Released: May 10, 2019; 2. "Darkness and Cold" Released: June 11, 2019; 3. "Margaritas at the Mall" Released: June 28, 2019

Purple Mountains is the only studio album by American indie rock band Purple Mountains. The album was released on July 12, 2019, by Drag City. It is the final overall album by David Berman before his death on August 7, 2019, less than four weeks after the album's release.

Purple Mountains was the first new studio album from David Berman since the disbandment of Silver Jews in 2009. Created over the course of four years, the album went through numerous failed attempts at writing and recording with different musicians and producers including Dan Auerbach, Dan Bejar, Stephen Malkmus and Jeff Tweedy. It was eventually recorded in 2018 with members of the band Woods, in both Chicago and Brooklyn. Woods members Jarvis Taveniere and Jeremy Earl produced the album.

The album's themes were inspired by the death of Berman's mother, his retirement from music, his struggles with depression, and his strained relationship with his wife. Berman also made the album in hopes of paying down a six-figure debt he had built up. It was preceded by the singles "All My Happiness Is Gone", "Darkness and Cold", and "Margaritas at the Mall". On release, the album received critical acclaim and was featured in numerous year-end lists.

== Background and origins ==
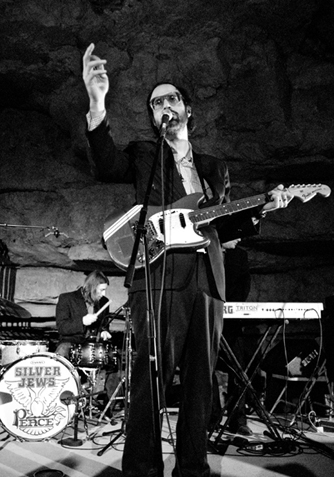
Berman performing his final show with Silver Jews in 2009.

In January 2009, David Berman disbanded Silver Jews, playing one final show on January 31 at the Cumberland Caverns in McMinnville, Tennessee. He later revealed that he was frustrated with the reception to the final Silver Jews album, Lookout Mountain, Lookout Sea (2008), including a 6.7/10 review from Pitchfork. In a podcast interview with Vish Khanna in 2019, Berman said, "In that point, in 2008, a Pitchfork review really meant a lot [...] That really burned me for a long time. I really tried as hard as I could, and I really got the message back that maybe I had peaked. So I decided to walk away from it." Berman also said he felt older musicians stuck around too long, and that he could step away and make room for someone else. When Silver Jews disbanded, Berman retreated to his house in Nashville, Tennessee, and "buried" himself in books. In an interview with The Washington Post in 2019, Berman said, "I saw no one and did nothing." Berman, who long suffered from treatment-resistant depression, said to Khanna, "There probably were a hundred nights over the last ten years where I was sure I wouldn't make it to the morning. Yeah, I'm a very depressed person. And I felt even worse about myself as time went on and I wasn't doing anything. So I do feel better now having completed this project."

When his mother died in 2014, Berman was inspired exactly a week later to pick up his guitar and play while he was in her house in Wooster, Ohio. He eventually came back to the chord progression he had played and it became "I Loved Being My Mother's Son", the first song written for the album. He also separated from his wife of twenty years, Cassie Berman, in 2018. Berman said they did not divorce and were still friends, commenting, "She's all I have as far as family anymore." Their separation is the subject of the album's third track, "Darkness and Cold". It also inspired the album's sixth track, "She's Making Friends, I'm Turning Stranger". Berman also attributed his return to music as a necessity for an income in order to pay down the over $100,000 of debt he amassed in credit card debt and loans, which he said was always over his head and "draining to worry about."

In Nashville, Berman befriended The Black Keys frontman Dan Auerbach, who had recently moved to the city. The two would sometimes collaborate, with Auerbach writing music and Berman writing lyrics, but Berman backed out as Auerbach focused on other projects. However, Auerbach has a songwriting credit on the tenth and final track on Purple Mountains, "Maybe I'm the Only One for Me". Auerbach's side project, The Arcs, performed an early version of the song on their 2016 tour. Berman also co-wrote The Arcs' song "Young", which was released in November 2015 as part of their six-song EP The Arcs vs. The Inventors Vol. I.

== Production ==
=== 2017 sessions ===
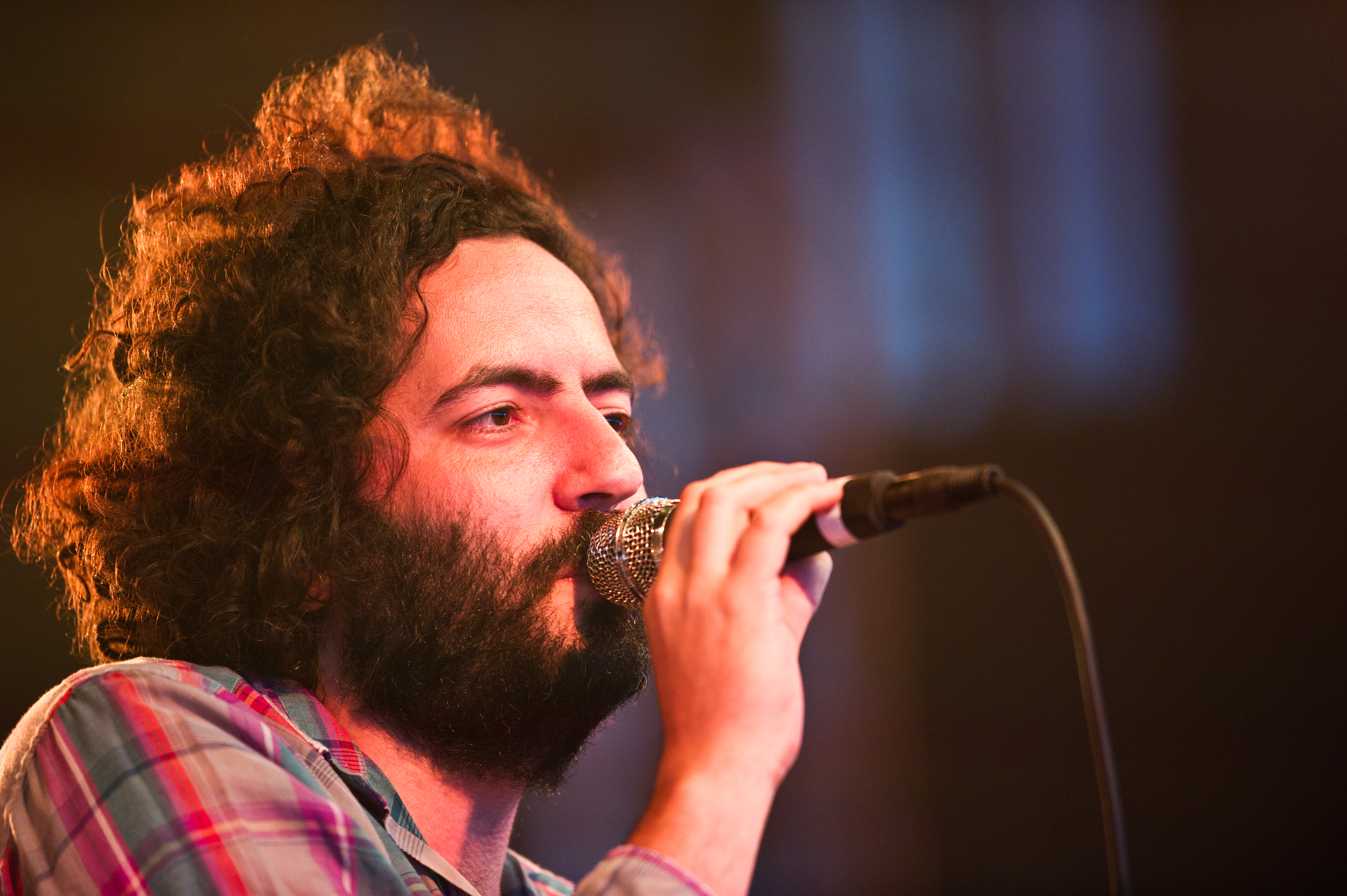
The album was originally to be produced in Vancouver by Dan Bejar, but the sessions were later scrapped.

Berman first reached out to Canadian musician and Destroyer frontman Dan Bejar through e-mail in the fall of 2016. He did not know Bejar personally but was a fan of his music and had read Bejar say positive things about Silver Jews. Bejar had never produced before but told Berman he was willing to try, and the two made loose plans to work together. Berman, who "famously obsessed over his lyrics," went on an "extended eight-month West Coast walkabout". He spent time writing in Joshua Tree, California. His wife Cassie came out for his 50th birthday in January 2017 and they rented a place in Malibu. He then drove to Portland, Oregon, and rented another place for three months in order to write.

From April to July 2017, Bejar and David Carswell set out to produce the album at JC/DC Studios in Vancouver, Canada. The band for the sessions included members of Destroyer. Berman's longtime friend Stephen Malkmus, the frontman of Pavement and a fellow founding member of Silver Jews, also worked in the studio for a few days. Black Mountain drummer Joshua Wells and bass player Colin Cowan also participated in the Vancouver sessions. Berman stayed in Point Roberts, Washington, a US enclave located south of Vancouver. He attempted to write there, but found he could not finish the lyrics. Bejar recommended recording the music first and finishing the lyrics later. Berman felt the music they recorded was "rigid" and ultimately found writing lyrics for the music, which he had never done before, to be impossible. Berman returned home to Nashville to re-write the album and eventually found his previous problems had "solved themselves."

In a January 2020 interview with Pitchfork, Bejar reflected that he had trouble getting Berman to sing in the studio and that, compared to the songs on Purple Mountains, the songs they recorded were "incredibly loud and brittle and dry and compressed" with vocals similar to that of Serge Gainsbourg. According to him, there were "lots of really wild lines that would have fit in more with '90s Berman—just blasting images, more manic, which was actually the state he was in". As the process continued, Berman became disinterested in said lyrical material and most of it went unused. Bejar also revealed that there are "halfway to final mixes of an album's worth of music" but that the decision to release them is up to Drag City. He also indicated that he is unsure if Berman "would have wanted the world to hear it."

=== 2018 sessions ===
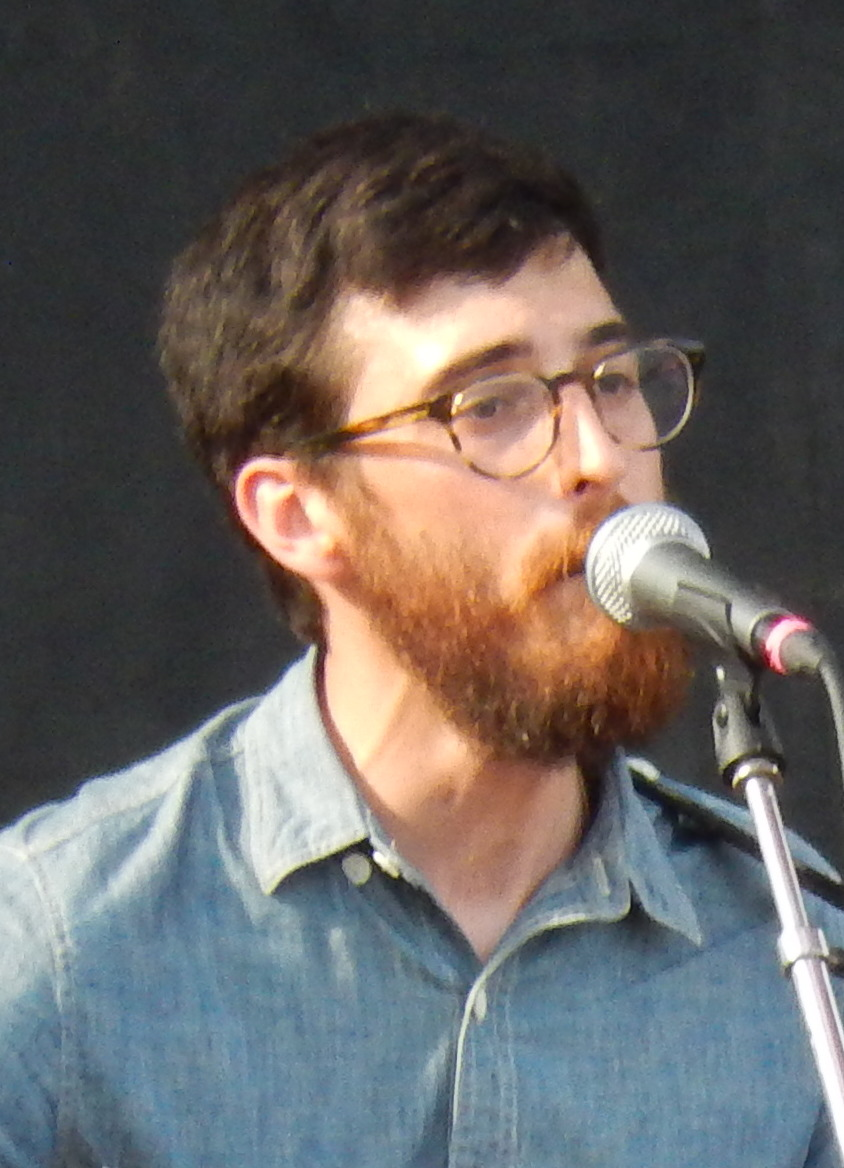
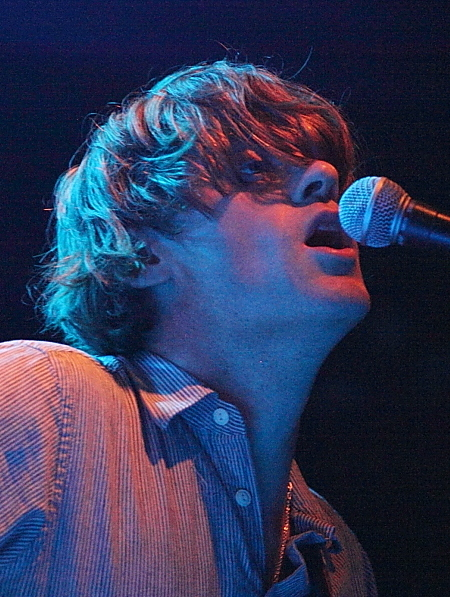
Jeremy Earl (left) and Jarvis Taveniere (right) of the band Woods produced the album in Chicago.

On February 14, 2018, Valentine's Day, Berman separated from his wife and drove from Nashville to Miller Beach, a neighborhood of Gary, Indiana. He lived there in Gary for part of 2018 in a "vacation cabin" owned by Drag City. In June 2018, Berman moved to Chicago, Illinois, living alone in a spare room above the Drag City office. He eventually reached out to Jeremy Earl of the band Woods very early in the morning by email. He asked Earl and fellow Woods member Jarvis Taveniere, both of whom he had never spoken to before, to produce the album. The two, who had listened to Silver Jews together for years, agreed almost immediately.

The album was recorded primarily at Jamdek Studios in Chicago, with some parts recorded at Thump Studios in Brooklyn, New York. Most of the album was recorded live with Berman occupying a booth while Earl and Taveniere were together in a separate room. Berman had pages of alternative lyrics for each song with him. They did multiple sessions of overdubs and Berman wanted to retry vocals. However, for many of the songs they ended up using the original first take vocals because, according to Taveniere, "they were hard to match." The last song Berman wrote for the album was "Darkness and Cold", which he also claimed as his favorite on the album. The album also features contributions from Woods drummer Aaron Neveu and from singer-songwriter Anna St. Louis, who recorded her vocals in an hour during a mixing session in Los Angeles. The album was mixed by Taveniere in November 2018 at Electrical Audio in Chicago.

Berman had also at one point worked with Wilco frontman Jeff Tweedy, who did "spec production work" on a few songs, but Berman decided to go in a different direction for the full album.

== Music and lyrics ==
"All My Happiness is Gone"
"Favor[ing] idiomatic precision in place of poetic specificity", Berman laments the state of his friendships, as a two-chord acoustic guitar progression plays; evocative of older country tunes, and, in delivery, Berman's earlier work.

Khanna and Berman both viewed the album as a "break-up record". The opening two songs feature dark lyricism juxtaposed against "jolly" instrumention. "Maybe I'm the Only One for Me" was intended as to be from an incel's perspective and was, in his eyes, the "ultimate neo-liberal love song, as we sit in a place of peak individualism".

The album's lyrics are heavily inspired by Berman's lifetime struggle with depression and addiction and the circumstances of his life in the years preceding his death. He had separated from his wife and told Vish Khanna, "I don't have any desire to be in a relationship with anyone else, and I do feel like I'm on the other side of my career of being a Lothario". After his death, some listeners suggested that the album may have been a suicide note. Gate Pratt, a college friend and writing partner of Berman's, has said that he discussed many songs including "Darkness and Cold" and "She's Making Friends, I'm Turning Stranger" with Berman many years before Purple Mountains. Pratt dismissed the notion that the album is a "suicide note". Commenting on "Maybe I'm the Only One for Me", Pratt said: "That song was intended to be hopeful and upbeat and optimistic — like a recognition that you could be happy alone. Him putting that song at the end of the album was intentional and, I think, meant to signal, 'I'm okay with all this.'"

== Release and promotion ==
=== Announcement and singles ===
On December 12, 2018, former Pavement and Silver Jews member Bob Nastanovich revealed on his podcast Three Songs that David Berman would release new music in 2019 under the name Purple Mountains, which was also the name of Berman's blog. The name "Purple Mountains" is a mondegreen of the lyric "Purple mountain majesties" from "America the Beautiful". Although, his blog was also titled Menthol Mountains at times.

On May 10, 2019, the single "All My Happiness Is Gone" was released on vinyl by Drag City. The single included two remixes of the song, "All My Happiness Is Wrong" by Noah Count and "All My Happiness Is Long" by Mark Nevers featuring clipped recordings of Dave Cloud, and also indicated that a full-length album was a "couple months away." It credited Berman as well as Jeremy Earl, Jarvis Taveniere, and Aaron Neveu of Woods and songwriter Anna St. Louis. The single was released digitally on May 17, 2019, with the announcement of a full-length album. A remix of "All My Happiness Is Gone" by Australian electronic music group The Avalanches, who Berman has collaborated with in the past, was commissioned by him, but a licensing issue prevented their version from being released.

"Darkness and Cold" was released as the album's second single on June 11, 2019. A music video directed by Ben Berman (who is not related to David) was released the same day. It stars David and his wife Cassie as she prepares to go out for the night without him, reflecting the subject of the song. "Margaritas at the Mall" was released as the album's third and final single on June 28, 2019.

=== Tour ===
Purple Mountains was set to tour in support of the album, beginning on August 10, 2019, in Kingston, New York, and concluding on September 23, 2019, in Los Angeles; however, Berman died three days before the first show was set to occur. All dates were located in the United States except for two in Canada. The tour was to feature opening acts Empty Country, Jeffrey Lewis, unmastered Masters, Diane Cluck with Isabel Castellvi, Country Westerns, State Champion, Bill MacKay, Axis: Sova, Xiao Yao, Lightning Dust, and Herman Dune. The tour included a date at Hopscotch Music Festival in Raleigh, North Carolina. In a Reddit AMA, Berman said he planned to tour Europe in either February or March 2020. Berman had called the tour a "necessity" in order to pay down credit card debt and loans he built up.

== Critical reception ==
Professional ratings
Aggregate scores
Source	Rating
AnyDecentMusic?	8.3/10
Metacritic	87/100
Review scores
Source	Rating
AllMusic	5/5 stars
Consequence of Sound	A−
The Guardian	5/5 stars
The Irish Times	4/5 stars
Mojo	4/5 stars
Pitchfork	8.5/10
Q	4/5 stars
Rolling Stone	3.5/5 stars
The Times	4/5 stars
Uncut	9/10

Purple Mountains was lauded by critics upon its release. At Metacritic, which assigns a normalized rating out of 100 to reviews from mainstream publications, the album received an average score of 87, based on 20 reviews, indicating "universal acclaim".

Ben Beaumont-Thomas of The Guardian gave the album a perfect score, writing, "Cries for help have rarely been so clear, self-aware, and funny." Writing for Uncut, Erin Osmon gave the album a 9 out of 10, writing, "The 10 songs assembled here owe as much to Townes Van Zandt's picaresque story songs as they do Dylan's sardonic poetics; they all gnaw at the heart and consciousness. Berman sings of life's travails in fluid and acrobatic phrasing, with each spin revealing a nuance in tone or pronunciation that turns the lyric in a profound or unexpected way, a slow reveal that begs repeat listens. It's unequivocally dark, relatable and addictive." Alex Wisgard of The Line of Best Fit called the album "one of the year's most rewarding" and "most honest". Brian Howe of Spin said, "The arrangements, some of the most gracious Berman's ever had, hum and glow with foggy organs and soft golden horns. Their serenity is at odds with his desperation: This is a portrait of a shattered man."

Chris DeVille of Stereogum called the album a "devastating self-portrait, delivered one bracingly literal observation at a time". Writing for The Wall Street Journal, Mark Richardson said that Berman's "lyrics remain idiosyncratic marvels of wrenching, wry hilarity" and "Purple Mountains [...] picks up where his earlier group left off. The production is a bit more ornate and the songs reflect another decade of hard living, but this is a Silver Jews record in all but name, and a very good one." Writing for Slate, Carl Wilson said, "The relative plainspokenness of Purple Mountains is a sign of a maturing craft, of not wanting to play evasive games." Lauren Murphy of The Irish Times said, "At all times, Berman's ruminative voice is a commanding force over scuffled indie, toe-tappy country pop and occasional Mariachi-style infusions of brass. It's good to have him back."

In a less favorable review, Ludovic Hunter-Tilney of the Financial Times said, "Although his monotonous vocal style and a lack of musical variation prevent the album from really taking off, its movement towards consolation with the irresistible "Storyline Fever" feels like a deserved victory."

=== Year-end lists ===
Year-end lists for Purple Mountains
Publication	List	Rank	Ref.
Bandcamp Daily	The Best Albums of 2019	6	
BrooklynVegan	Top 50 Albums of 2019	4	
Consequence of Sound	Top 50 Albums of 2019	23	
The Guardian	The 50 best albums of 2019	45	
The Line of Best Fit	The Best Albums of 2019	31	
Loud and Quiet	Best 40 albums of 2019	4	
Magnet	Top 25 Albums of 2019	14	
Mojo	The 75 Best Albums of 2019	9	
Noisey	The 100 Best Albums of 2019	7	
Now	The 10 best albums of 2019	3	
Paste	The 50 Best Albums of 2019	16	
Pitchfork	The 50 Best Albums of 2019	10	
PopMatters	The 70 Best Albums of 2019	10	
Q	The 50 Albums of the Year	39	
The Ringer	The Best Albums of 2019	3	
Rolling Stone	The 50 Best Albums of 2019	37	
Slant Magazine	The 25 Best Albums of 2019	7	
Spectrum Culture	Top 20 Albums of 2019	1	
Spin	The 10 Best Albums of 2019	2	
Sputnikmusic	Top 50 Albums of 2019	7	
Stereogum	The 50 Best Albums of 2019	3	
Uncut	The Top 75 Albums of the Year	3	
Under the Radar	Top 100 Albums of 2019	11	
Uproxx	The Best Albums of 2019	15	
Vice	The 100 Best Albums of 2019	7	

=== Decade-end lists ===
Decade-end lists for Purple Mountains
Publication	List	Rank	Ref.
BrooklynVegan	141 Best Albums of the 2010s	86	
Pitchfork	The 200 Best Albums of the 2010s	153	
Slant Magazine	The 100 Best Albums of the 2010s	70	
Spin	The 101 Best Albums of the 2010s	47	
Stereogum	The 100 Best Albums of the 2010s	68	

== Legacy and tributes ==
In September 2019 at the Woodsist Festival in Accord, New York, Woods performed a tribute to Berman. Taveniere and Earl, accompanied by Kevin Morby, Kyle Field and Anna St. Louis, performed "All My Happiness is Gone" with Field on lead vocals. They closed with a performance of Silver Jews's "Random Rules", with Kevin Morby on lead vocals.

On October 7, 2019, the tribute album Approaching Perfection: A Tribute To DC Berman was released. It features a cover of "Snow Is Falling in Manhattan" by Galaxie 500's Dean Wareham.

On January 4, 2020, Union Pool in Brooklyn hosted DCBday, two concerts in tribute to David Berman on his birthday. Proceeds went to Musicares and the American Foundation for Suicide Prevention. The lineup included The Hold Steady's Craig Finn, Ken Griffin (August Wells) and Silver Jews members Steve West and Matt Hunter. Purple Mountains collaborators Cassandra Jenkins and Kyle Forester appeared as well as Titus Andronicus' Patrick Stickles also appeared. Members of Berman's former band at UVA, Ectoslavia, also appeared. Steve Keene created hundreds of paintings for sale at the event. The same day, the birthday tribute concert "Bike Chain Rain: A Birthday Tribute to David Cloud Berman" was held at Bunk Bar in Portland, Oregon. The show featured Stephen Malkmus and Bob Nastanovich of Pavement. William Tyler and Rebecca Gates (The Spinanes) covered "Snow Falling in Manhattan". Also on the same day, Speedy Ortiz organized "Philly Remembers David Berman: A Birthday Tribute" at World Cafe Live in Philadelphia.

In November 2020, a cover of "Snow Is Falling in Manhattan" by Chilly Gonzales was released on his Christmas album A very chilly christmas. It features vocals by Jarvis Cocker and Feist.

Lyrics from "Darkness and Cold" appear on the album We Will Always Love You (2020) by The Avalanches. The lyrics appear on the track "Dial D for Devotion", sung by Karen O, and on the track "Running Red Lights", sung by Pink Siifu. Berman first collaborated with The Avalanches in 2012, on their track "A Cowboy Overflow of the Heart", which featured Berman reading a poem he composed over music by the group. Berman later appeared as a vocalist on The Avalanches' album Wildflower (2016), reading a poem on the album's closing track "Saturday Night Inside Out".

On January 5, 2021, Jeff Tweedy covered "Snow Is Falling in Manhattan" with his sons Sammy and Spencer on The Tweedy Show.

On January 27, 2023, the Arcs released Electrophonic Chronic, a collection of unreleased tracks largely recorded before the death of Arcs member Richard Swift. The album's closing track, "Only One for Me", is the original version of "Maybe I'm the Only One for Me" that Berman and Auerbach created. Due to the band's touring and side projects, recording for a new Arcs album had stalled. Berman grew disappointed that the band had not released more of the music they wrote together. Berman would spend several years developing the song that became "Maybe I'm the Only One for Me", giving it a "jaunty country" sound and a "darker, more despondent" lyrical slant.

== Track listing ==
All tracks are written by David Berman, except where noted.

No.	Title	Length
1.	"That's Just the Way That I Feel"	3:23
2.	"All My Happiness Is Gone"	4:20
3.	"Darkness and Cold"	3:58
4.	"Snow Is Falling in Manhattan"	6:03
5.	"Margaritas at the Mall"	3:54
6.	"She's Making Friends, I'm Turning Stranger"	4:11
7.	"I Loved Being My Mother's Son"	4:20
8.	"Nights That Won't Happen"	6:08
9.	"Storyline Fever"	4:46
10.	"Maybe I'm the Only One for Me" (Berman, Dan Auerbach, Gate Pratt)	3:18
Total length:		44:21

== Personnel ==
Credits adapted from liner notes.

Musicians

- David Berman – vocals, guitar
- Jeremy Earl – drums (1–5, 8, 10), guitar (1, 3, 6, 7, 9), vocals (2–5, 7–9), percussion (1–7, 9, 10), Mellotron (2)
- Jarvis Taveniere – bass (1, 3, 5–10), guitars (2–4, 7, 8)
- Aaron Neveu – guitar (1, 5, 8, 10), bass (2, 4), drums (6, 7, 9)
- Kyle Forester – piano (1), organ (2–6), Mellotron (6, 8), harmonica (3), melodica (7)
- Cole Kamen-Green – trumpet (1, 4, 5)
- Justin Brown – pedal steel (5, 6, 10; uncredited on 4)
- Anna St. Louis – vocals (2–5)
- John Andrews – organ (9), vocals (9)
- Chris Stroffolino – Hammond (9)
- Haley Fohr – vocals (8)

Technical

- Jarvis Taveniere – production, engineering, mixing
- Jeremy Earl – production
- Dan Koretzky – executive production
- Cooper Crain – auxiliary recording
- Peyton Pinkerton – auxiliary recording
- Carl Saff – lacquer cut

Artwork

- Christian Patterson – center photo
- Cassie Berman – dog photos

== Charts ==
Chart (2019)	Peak position
UK Independent Albums (Official Charts)	7
UK Independent Album Breakers (OCC)	1

== Sources ==
- Khanna, Vish (June 12, 2019). "Ep. #481: David Berman". Kreative Kontrol (Podcast).
- Nastanovich, Bob; Hogan, Mike (December 12, 2018). "Episode 79 - December 12, 2018 (Silver Jews Spotlight)". 3 Songs Podcast (Podcast).
