= Trinity Episcopal School (Virginia) =

Private high school in Virginia, US

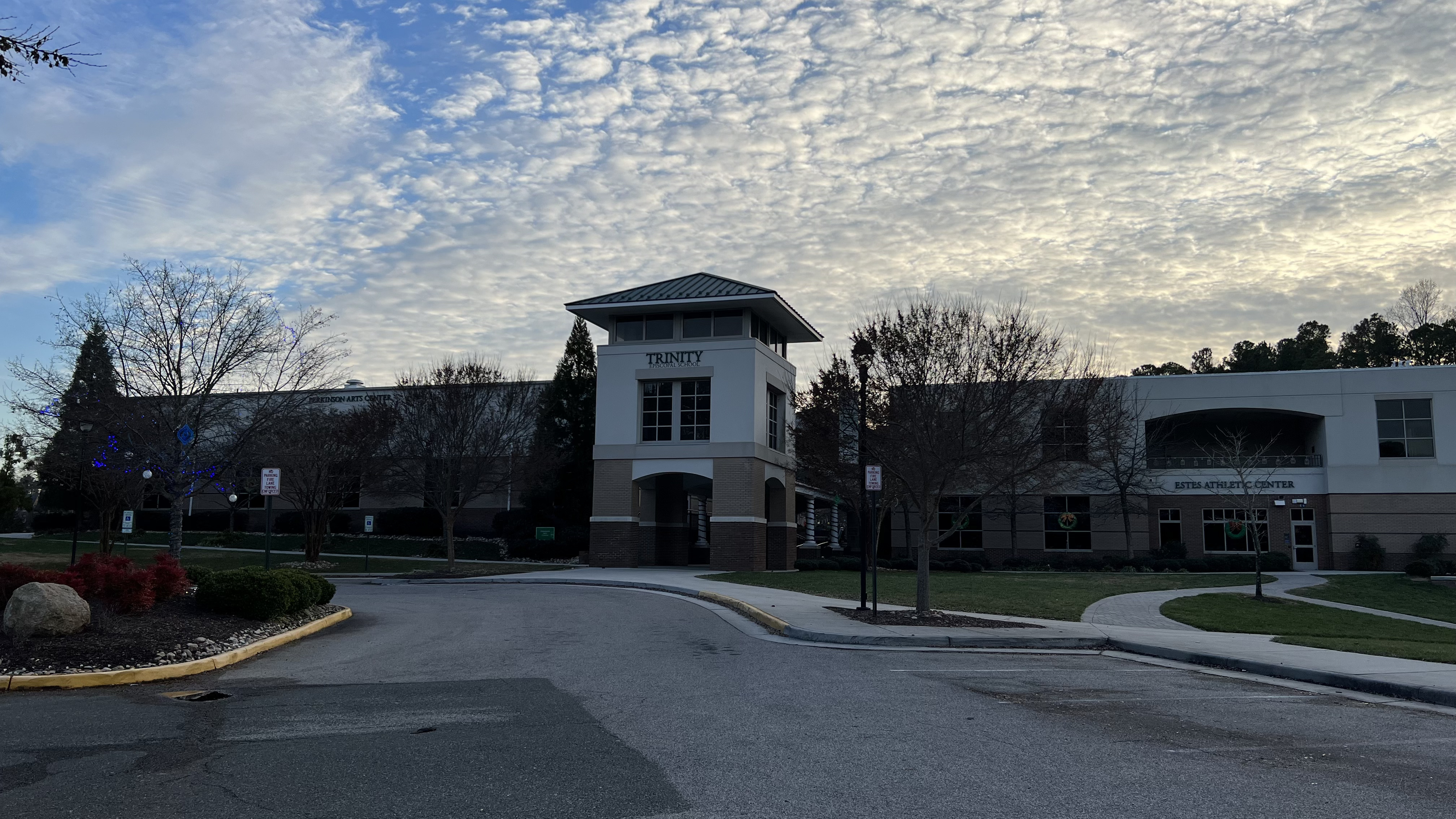

Location
- 3850 Pittaway Drive; Richmond, VA 23235; United States; 37°33′1″N 77°35′40″W

Information
- Type: Private, independent, parochial school
- Motto: Discover Your Path
- Religious affiliation: Episcopal
- Established: 1972
- Headmaster: Robert 'Rob' Short
- Faculty: 54.9 FTE
- Grades: 8–12
- Gender: co-educational
- Enrollment: 510 (2023-2024)
- Average class size: 14
- Student to teacher ratio: 9.3:1
- Campus: 39 acres
- Campus type: Suburban
- Colors: Green, White, and Navy
- Athletics: 36 Athletic teams
- Athletics conference: Virginia Preparatory League (Boys); League of Independent Schools (Girls)
- Nickname: Trinity Titans
- Team name: Titans
- Accreditation: Virginia Association of Independent Schools; National Association of Independent Schools
- Newspaper: Titan Trail
- Tuition: $30,180 (2025-26)
- Website: School website

Trinity Episcopal School is a private, independent, liberal arts high school located in Richmond, Virginia. It is also an International Baccalaureate World School, the first in Richmond. Trinity started as a small independent school in 1972. The school is led by headmaster Rob Short.

== Athletics ==
Trinity is a member of the Virginia Preparatory League for boys sports and the League of Independent Schools for girls sports, and is a member of the Virginia Independent Schools Athletic Association.

== Notable alumni ==
- Bob Nastanovich, member of the indie rock band Pavement, as well as a former member of Silver Jews, Ectoslavia, Pale Horse Riders, and Misshapen Lodge.
- Armando Bacot, professional basketball player for the Memphis Grizzlies, transferred from Trinity before his senior year.
