= Actual Air =

1999 book of poetry by David Berman

- Cover of first edition
- Author: David Berman
- Cover artist: Roe Ethridge
- Language: English
- Genre: Poetry
- Publisher: Open City Books
- Publication date: July 1999
- Publication place: United States
- Media type: Print (paperback)
- Pages: 93
- ISBN: 978-1-890447-04-5
- Dewey Decimal: 811/.54
- LC Class: PS3552.E72496 A64 1999

Actual Air is a book of poetry written by David Berman and published by Open City Books in July 1999. A limited hardcover version was published by Drag City in August 2003.

== Contents ==
=== 1. ===
- "Snow"
- "Classic Water"
- "Civics"
- "Governors on Sominex"
- "The Spine of the Snowman"
- "The Coahoma County Wind Cults"
- "Imagining Defeat"
- "Tableau Through Shattered Monocle"
- "If There Was a Book About This Hallway"
- "Narrated by a Committee"
- "Cassette County"
- "World: Series"
- "Tulsa"
- "Community College in the Rain"
- "The Charm of 5:30"
- "The Moon"

=== 2. ===
- "From Cantos for James Michener: Part II"
- "New York, New York"
- "The Night Nurse Essays"
- "From "Guide to the Graves of British Actors""
- "Serenade for a Wealthy Widow"
- "The Homeowner's Prayer"
- "From His Bed in the Capital City"
- "Nervous Ashers"
- "April 13th, 1865"
- "Self Portrait at 28"

=== 3. ===
- "From Cantos for James Michener: Part I"
- "Coral Gables"
- "The New Idea"
- "How I Met Your Mother"
- "They Don't Acknowledge the Letter C"
- "Democratic Vistas"
- "Piano and Scene"
- "Of Things Found Where They Are Not Supposed to Be"
- "A Letter from Isaac Asimov to His Wife Janet, Written on His Deathbed"
- "Virginia Mines: The Mascara Series"
- "Now II"
- "War in Apartment 1812"
- "The Double Bell of Heat"

== Publication ==
Robert Bingham, founder and then-editor of the New York literary magazine Open City, had already published a few of Berman's poems. Bingham encouraged Berman to complete a book. Bingham founded Open City Books, an independent publisher, specifically to publish Actual Air, making it Open City Books' first publication.

== Reception ==
Publishers Weekly praised the book, comparing parts of it to the poetry of John Ashbery and Thomas Lux and writing, "Berman's debut [announces] the discovery of great American poetic storytelling by a new generation."

In his review for Spin, Joshua Clover praised the book, writing, "his instrument is his own; very few of the poems fail to find a finger of mystery, a ring of familiarity. All of which makes for a rarity in contemporary poetry: It's what book clubs call "readable.""

David Kirby of The New York Times likened the "whimsy" of Actual Air to the works of poets Mark Halliday and Campbell McGrath, but felt "In their poems, though, whimsy always leads to serious ideas and emotions that don't consistently materialize here." However, Kirby concluded his review calling the book "funny, smart, on-again, off-again poetry of great promise."

Writing for Boston Review, poet Ethan A. Paquin called Berman a "master collector of American miscellany" and praising Berman's ability "to examine the pathos underpinning banal scenery and situations [...] with eyes trained on beauty and transcendence," producing "a lush and poignant portrait of "the view from falling behind.""

The book received praise from poets James Tate and Billy Collins.

== Legacy ==
In 2005, Wyatt Mason of The New York Times called the book "one of the most highly acclaimed debuts for a poet in recent memory." In conversation with Mason, Billy Collins said the poems of Actual Air "are full of complex turns and tricks and conceptual hijinks, and yet there's this surface clarity. You're welcomed into the poem."

In her 2009 book Slanted and Enchanted: The Evolution of Indie Culture, Kaya Oakes wrote, "In many ways, just as indie rock was nudging its way toward the mainstream, Actual Air helped to open the doors for independent publishing to do the same."

== Publication history ==
- Actual Air (Paperback). New York City: Open City Books. July 1999. ISBN 978-1-890447-04-5.
- Actual Air (Hardcover). Chicago: Drag City. August 18, 2003. ISBN 978-0-9656183-6-6.
