= The Natural Bridge =

Studio album by Silver Jews
- Released: October 1, 1996
- Recorded: July 1996
- Genre: Country rock
- Length: 35:43
- Label: Drag City
- Producer: Rian Murphy; Shadwell Cougars

Silver Jews chronology
Starlite Walker (1994)	The Natural Bridge (1996)	American Water (1998)

Professional ratings
Review scores
Source	Rating
AllMusic	3.5/5 stars
Christgau's Consumer Guide	(neither)
Pitchfork	9.2/10
Spin	6/10

The Natural Bridge is the second studio album by American indie rock band the Silver Jews. Released in 1996 as an LP and CD on Drag City (DC101) in America and Domino (WIG28) in Europe, The Natural Bridge was engineered and mixed by Michael Deming and Thom Monahan and features cover art by Mike Flood. Featured musicians include: David Berman; Matt Hunter; Rian Murphy; Peyton Pinkerton; and Michael Deming.

Some tracks on the album were originally recorded using members of the Scud Mountain Boys as Berman's backing band, but scrapped. None of these recordings have ever been released, and were rumored to have been destroyed. According to the Scuds' Joe Pernice, the songs sounded "exactly like the Scud Mountain Boys with David Berman singing" and not like previous Silver Jews recordings. An unreleased cover of Echo and the Bunnymen's "The Killing Moon" was also recorded with the Scuds.

Another 1995 session, with Pavement members Stephen Malkmus, Bob Nastanovich, and Steve West, was aborted when Berman stormed out of the recording studio. The remaining musicians used the paid studio time to record Pavement's Pacific Trim EP.

The name refers to two natural bridges that David Berman was aware of, one of which in Virginia inspired him to name the album after it. With respect to the album, Berman said "I was living in Charlottesville at the time and spending a lot of time in Lexington with Steve West’s family. I was in the [Natural Bridge Park] gift shop and realized if I called the album Natural Bridge, everything in the store would be instantly be converted into promotional merchandise. Sort of like my idea for the band Trad. Arr. that would infuriate record collectors and rock critics who would normally never deign to acknowledge 'my work' by covering their most treasured objects into advertisements for my band."

== Track listing ==
All lyrics are written by David Berman; all music is composed by Berman.

The Natural Bridge track listing
No.	Title	Length
1.	"How to Rent a Room"	3:02
2.	"Pet Politics"	4:04
3.	"Black and Brown Blues"	4:04
4.	"Ballad of Reverend War Character"	3:46
5.	"The Right to Remain Silent"	2:36
6.	"Dallas"	4:13
7.	"Inside the Golden Days of Missing You"	2:26
8.	"Albemarle Station"	3:40
9.	"The Frontier Index"	3:37
10.	"Pretty Eyes"	4:12
Total length:		35:40
