= Tanglewood Numbers =

Studio album by Silver Jews
- Released: October 18, 2005
- Genre: Indie rock
- Length: 34:51
- Label: Drag City
- Producer: David Berman

Silver Jews chronology
Bright Flight (2001)	Tanglewood Numbers (2005)	Lookout Mountain, Lookout Sea (2008)

Tanglewood Numbers is the fifth studio album by American indie rock band Silver Jews. The album was released in October 18, 2005.

Like on all of their other albums, Silver Jews' principal songwriter and constant band member is David Berman. On this album fourteen other musicians are involved in the performance and creation. Tanglewood Numbers marked the return of Pavement members Stephen Malkmus and Bob Nastanovich into Silver Jews. Malkmus had last appeared on American Water while Nastanovich had last appeared on the band's debut album Starlite Walker. Cassie Berman, David Berman's then wife, also appears, as does Will Oldham.

The album's cover is a photograph by famed Southern photographer William Eggleston.

== Background ==
In the four years between Bright Flight and Tanglewood Numbers, Silver Jews frontman David Berman had suffered from substance abuse, depression and a suicide attempt. However, Berman was able to rehabilitate and he became more deeply involved into his Jewish faith.

During its recording, Tanglewood Numbers was nearly destroyed in a fire that burned down Memphis' historic Easley-McCain studio, where the album was going to be mastered.

== Reception ==
Professional ratings
Aggregate scores
Source	Rating
Metacritic	81/100
Review scores
Source	Rating
AllMusic	4.5/5 stars
Alternative Press	4/5 stars
Entertainment Weekly	B+
Mojo	4/5 stars
Pitchfork	7.9/10
PopMatters	8/10
Spin	A−
Stylus Magazine	B
Uncut	9/10
The Village Voice	B+

Tanglewood Numbers has received mostly positive reviews. According to Metacritic, the album has a score of 81 out of 100, based on 32 critics reviews, indicating "Universal acclaim."

Giving the album a 4.5 out of 5 stars, Heather Phares of AllMusic, in references to Berman's past problem, wrote "Hopefully the circumstances around Tanglewood Numbers will never repeat themselves, but there's no denying that this is a uniquely powerful and moving set of songs." PopMatters' Josh Berquist also gave the album a positive review, writing "Even if it's not their finest work, it certainly feels like it is. There is a visceral vitality to Tanglewood Numbers that has never inhabited any album prior."

In a more mixed review, Dusted Reviews' Nathan Hogan criticized Berman's less prominent vocals, writing "...Berman's a brilliant lyricist with 30 or 40 minutes to spare every couple of years, and his voice seems oddly absent from this record." However, Hogan concluded his review with "In the end, disliking Tanglewood Numbers leaves me feeling a bit like one of the schlubs who groused about Dylan going electric... I suppose it's possible this record's a grower. For the time being, that's the best there is to say about it." The Times Union called the record "OK."

== Track listing ==
All tracks are written by David Berman, except where noted.

No.	Title	Writer(s)	Length
1.	"Punks in the Beerlight"		3:30
2.	"Sometimes a Pony Gets Depressed"		2:36
3.	"K-Hole"	David Berman, Mike Fellows	2:38
4.	"Animal Shapes"		3:00
5.	"I'm Getting Back into Getting Back into You"		2:34
6.	"How Can I Love You If You Won't Lie Down"		2:01
7.	"The Poor, the Fair and the Good"	Berman; Cassie Berman	4:14
8.	"Sleeping Is the Only Love"		2:56
9.	"The Farmer's Hotel"	Berman; Stephen Malkmus; Gate Pratt; Jeff Grosfeld	7:03
10.	"There Is a Place"		4:19
Total length:			34:51

== Personnel ==
The following people contributed to Tanglewood Numbers:

=== Silver Jews ===
- David Berman
- Brian Kotzur
- Mike Fellows
- Stephen Malkmus
- Bob Nastanovich
- Cassie Berman
- Tony Crow
- Paz Lenchantin
- Azita Youssefi
- Bobby Bare Jr.
- Will Oldham
- Duane Denison
- Pete Cummings
- William Tyler
- John St. West

=== Recording personnel ===
- Joe Funderburk – Mixing
- David Henry – Vocal Engineer
- Mark Nevers – Engineer
- Roger Seibel – Mastering

=== Additional personnel ===
- Alexander Graham Bell – Drawing
- William Eggleston – Photography
- Gerônimo – Drawing
- Jessica Jackson Hutchins – Drawing

== Charts ==
Chart (2005)	Peak position
US Top Heatseekers	43
US Independent Albums	50
