= Purple Mountains =

American indie rock band

- Origin: Chicago, Illinois, U.S.
- Years active: 2019
- Label: Drag City
- Past members: David Berman
- Website: www.dragcity.com/artists/purple-mountains

Purple Mountains was an American indie rock project formed by musician and poet David Berman. The project debuted in May 2019, over a decade after the dissolution of Berman's previous group Silver Jews. An eponymous album was released in July 2019. The album was recorded primarily in Chicago and produced by Jarvis Taveniere and Jeremy Earl of the band Woods.

The project's name is derived from "Purple mountains majesty", a common mondegreen of the lyric "Purple mountain majesties" from "America the Beautiful". Nashville Scene's Sean L. Maloney described it as "striking, heavy and maybe a little foreboding, yet it implies a majesty that is completely missing from the often-self-deprecating Silver Jews". Berman, the only member, died on August 7, 2019.

== Background ==
Berman returned to music in 2018, co-producing Yonatan Gat's second studio album Universalists. On December 12, 2018, former Pavement and Silver Jews member Bob Nastanovich revealed on his podcast Three Songs that David Berman would release new music in 2019 under the name Purple Mountains, which was also the name of Berman's blog. His blog was also titled Menthol Mountains at times.

On May 10, 2019, Berman released his first music in over a decade, a single entitled "All My Happiness Is Gone" on vinyl by Drag City, using the moniker Purple Mountains. The single included two remixes of the song, "All My Happiness Is Wrong" by Noah Count and "All My Happiness Is Long" by Mark Nevers featuring clipped recordings of Dave Cloud, and also indicated that a full-length album was a "couple months away." It also credited Berman, Jeremy Earl and Jarvis Taveniere of Woods, Aaron Neveu and songwriter Anna St. Louis. The single was released digitally on May 17, 2019, with the announcement of a full-length album and a planned North American tour. The eponymous debut album was released on July 12, 2019. "Darkness and Cold" was released as the album's second single on June 11, 2019. "Margaritas at the Mall" was released as the album's third and final single on June 28, 2019.

A remix of "All My Happiness Is Gone" by Australian electronic music group the Avalanches, who Berman has collaborated with in the past, was commissioned by him, but a licensing issue prevented their version from being released.

Berman died by suicide on August 7, 2019, less than a month after the album's release.

== Discography ==
=== Studio albums ===
- Purple Mountains (2019)

=== Singles ===
- "All My Happiness Is Gone" (2019)
- "Darkness and Cold" (2019)
- "Margaritas at the Mall" (2019)
