= American Water =

American Water may refer to:

- American Water (album)
- American Water Works, a water utility doing business as American Water
- American Water Works Association
- American Water Resources Association
