= Pure Slaughter Value =

1997 short story collection by American writer Robert Bingham

First edition (publ. Doubleday)

Pure Slaughter Value (1997) is a collection of 13 short stories by Robert Bingham, which, alongside his novel Lightning on the Sun (published 2000), represents the only works he produced prior to his death in 1999.

The stories are populated by "curiously unsympathetic" characters that are "jaded rich kids and yuppies strung out on familial malfeasance and their own immaturity, blocked from satisfaction in either work or love"; a Guardian review considered the stories to be "filled with hatred of the elitist world that spawned its author." The New York Times made note of Bingham's "acute observational powers and clean, reportorial prose."

== List of stories ==
- "I'm Talking About Another House"
- "This Is How A Woman Gets Hit"
- "The Target Audience"
- "Bad Stars"
- "The Other Family"
- "Plus One"
- "Doubles"
- "The Fixers"
- "How Much For Ho Chi Minh?"
- "Preexisting Condition"
- "Marriage Is Murder"
- "Reggae Nights"
- "Pure Slaughter Value"
