= Marble Valley (band) =

US musical group

Marble Valley is a band formed by Steve West, the drummer of the indie rock band Pavement.

Marble Valley is an international collective of individuals moulded together by Steve West, Pavement's drummer since Crooked Rain, Crooked Rain, and with David Berman on the Silver Jews albums, Starlite Walker and Tanglewood Numbers. Breakthrough is the band's 4th since 1997 and was conceived on 5 continents, in 17 countries while touring the planet during Pavement's reunion tour in 2010. It was mostly recorded by Remko in his Amsterdam studio.

== Personnel ==
- Steve 'John' West – Vocals
- Remko 'Duche' Schouten – Samples & Vocals
- James Waudby – Guitars & Vocals
- Andy Dimmack – Drums & Vocals
- Carl Hogarth – Piano & Keyboards
- Robert 'Beige' Ellerby – Bass
- Aaron Gammon – Percussion & Samples

== Discography ==
- Sauckiehall Street - Echo Static Records (1997)
- Sunset Sprinkler - Echo Static Records (2000)
- Wild Yams - Indikator Rekords (2006)
- Slash & Laugh - Indikator Rekords - Distributed in the UK by Sea Records (2008)
- Super Sober ep - Sea Records (2010)
- Breakthrough - Sea Records (2011)
