= Chris Stroffolino =

American poet

- Born: March 20, 1963 (age 63); Reading, Pennsylvania, U.S.
- Education: University of Albany
- Occupations: Poet, musician, writer
- Website: pianovan.com

Chris Stroffolino (born 20 March 1963 in Reading, Pennsylvania) is an American poet, writer, musician, critic, performer, and author. He worked alongside Steve Malkmus and David Berman on The Silver Jews' American Water (1998 Drag City). Stroffolino attended Albright College, Temple University, Bard College, and the University of Massachusetts Amherst before receiving a Ph.D. at State University of New York at Albany with a dissertation on William Shakespeare in 1998.

== Poetry ==
=== Early performance poetry ===
After moving to Philadelphia in 1986, Stroffolino auditioned for Lamont Steptoe of the Painted Bride Art Center and became a part of Philadelphia's spoken word scene alongside writers such as C.A. Conrad, Linh Dinh, Candace Kaucher, and Jerome Robinson. Stroffolino's first book of poems, Incidents (At The Corner of Desire & Disgust) was published by David Roskos' Vendetta Books (Iniquity Press) in 1990. Stroffolino co-edited The Painted Bride Quarterly from 1988–1990, worked on the local anarchist zine, Talk Is Cheap, and co-founded the underground punk warehouse, KillTime Place in 1989 while organizing reading series at The Schmidt-Dean Gallery and Borders Books.

Stroffolino's next book, "Oops" (published by Boulder Colorado's backyard press in 1991; republished by Pavement Saw Press in 1994) consisted of poems published in magazines but seldom performed at readings. It reached a wider audience across the country.

=== New York years ===
In the early 1990s, Stroffolino left Philadelphia to attend the University of Massachusetts-Amherst and SUNY-Albany, receiving a Ph.D. in 1998 with a dissertation on Shakespeare's middle comedies. In the meantime, he published Cusps (Edge Books, 1995), Light As A Fetter, (1997) and Stealer's Wheel (1999), performing his work from the Lollapalooza tour alongside Jeffrey McDaniel and David Baratier to SUNY-Buffalo's New Coast Conference.

Stealer's Wheel was praised by John Ashbery and James Tate, and Graham Foust wrote that "there's more of what's great in Ashbery and Tate in [Stealer's Wheel] than there is in most Ashbery and Tate."

Stroffolino's early mentor was John Yau. In the 21st century, Stroffolino published Scratch Vocals (2002), Speculative Primitive (2004), and An Anti-Emeryvillification Manifesto (2007).

=== Later work ===
Stroffolino's memoir, Death of a Selfish Altruist: Tales & Poems from a Minor League Culture Worker appeared in late 2017. He then had two major books of poetry published in 2018: Drinking From What I Once Wore: Selected and Recent Poems (Crisis Chronicles Press) and "Slumming It" in White Culture (Iniquity Press/Vendetta Books).

== Music ==
=== Silver Jews ===
Stroffolino joined David Berman and Steve Malkmus to play on The Silver Jews' American Water; his keyboard and trumpet can be heard most prominently on "The Wild Kindness" and "Random Rules". A longtime busker, this was Stroffolino's first experience in a studio.

=== Session work ===
In the 21st century, Stroffolino has recorded or performed with Brian Glaze, Greg Ashley, Steve Albini, Jolie Holland, Hudson Bell, and members of Essex Green, Drunk Horse, and Flipper.

=== Solo ===
In 2000, Stroffolino collaborated with conceptual artist Christine Hill and recreated Anne Sexton's rock band for the Poetry Society of America. With the band Volumen, he contributed to the soundtrack of Esther Bell's Goddass.

In the wake of the 9/11 attacks, he returned to the style of his first book with his controversial piece, "You Haven't Done Nuthin'", a rant-like poem often performed backed by a loud improvising rock band. In 2005, he toured the United States and Canada with Continuous Peasant and rejoined Silver Jews on stage in 2006 and 2008.

Stroffolino's one-off topical songs have appeared in Raw Story and The Thom Hartmann Show. In 2010, Stroffolino released his first solo album, Single-Sided Doubles, on Pop Snob Records, as a vinyl/CD hybrid. In 2013, his piano playing and singing caught the attention of American film director and screenwriter Jeff Feuerzeig, who began videotaping Stroffolino on the piano during "street sessions", while Stroffolino performed out of a van that he lived in. Feuerzeig also decided to make an "instant record" of Stroffolino performing, resulting in a 12-track album, The Piano Van Sessions. Feuerzeig's agent has heard Stroffolino's record and story and began representing him.

== Cultural and literary criticism ==
After co-editing An Anthology of New (American) Poets with Lisa Jarnot and Leonard Schwartz for Talisman House in 1998, Stroffolino published a critical edition of Shakespeare's Twelfth Night with Daniel Rosenthal (2000); the next year saw a collection of literary criticism entitled Spin Cycle. Critic Charles Altieri admired the populism of Spin Cycle's essay, "Radical Dogberry", and the American Book Review praised this collection for holding out an olive branch between the various warring factions in the literary world — especially in the essay, "Against Lineage", adding "but sometimes that branch seems to be on fire." More recently, Stroffolino has published music and culture criticism in The Big Takeover, Kitchen Sink, Viz, and Caught in the Carousel. In 2011, Self Portrait As Silver Jew was released as an e-book (45 rpm).

A recipient of a 2001 NYFA Grant and a 2008 grant from the Fund For Poetry, Stroffolino was visiting distinguished poet at St Mary's College in Moraga, California from 2001 to 2005. He is the subject of a Contemporary Authors monograph. Although Stroffolino has curtailed activities after a bike accident left him permanently disabled in 2004, he has done stints at Mills College, San Francisco Art Institute, University of California, Berkeley, and Laney College.
