= Silver Jew =

- Directed by: Michael Tully
- Produced by: Matthew Robison
- Starring: David Berman; Cassie Berman; Tony Crow; Brian Kotzur; Peyton Pinkerton; William Tyler
- Cinematography: Michael Tully
- Edited by: Jane Rizzo
- Release date: 2007
- Running time: 52 minutes
- Country: United States
- Language: English

Silver Jew is a 2007 documentary film by Michael Tully and Matthew Robison about the musician David Berman and his band Silver Jews. Shot in just three days with no production budget, the film chronicles the band's stop in Israel to play two shows in Tel Aviv and visit Jerusalem during their first ever world tour in the summer of 2006.

It was released on DVD by Drag City on September 23, 2008. Bonus features include an annotated slideshow, along with music videos for the songs "I'm Getting Back Into Getting Back Into You" and "Let's Not And Say We Did".
