= Marble Valley =

Marble Valley may refer to:

- Marble Valley, Alabama, unincorporated community
- Marble Valley Regional Transit District Rutland County, Vermont
- Marble Valley, Marble Mountains (Siskiyou County), Northern California
- Marble Valley (band)
