= Robert Bingham (writer) =

American author and editor (1966–1999)

Robert Worth Bingham IV (March 14, 1966 – November 28, 1999) was an American writer and a founding editor of the Open City Magazine.

== Early life ==
A member of a wealthy family from Louisville, Kentucky, his great-grandfather was the politician and newspaper publisher Robert Worth Bingham, and his grandfather, Barry Bingham, Sr., went into the family newspaper businesses as an editor and publisher. Bingham's father, Robert Worth Bingham III (known by his middle name), who also worked in the family business and was expected to take over, was killed aged 34 in a car accident while on vacation at Cape Cod in 1966, when his son was only three months old.

Bingham graduated from Brown University in 1988. He then received a Master of Fine Arts degree from Columbia University.

== Career ==
After graduating from Columbia, his fiction and non-fiction appeared in The New Yorker, and he worked for two years as a reporter for the Cambodia Daily. He wrote the short story collection Pure Slaughter Value and the novel Lightning on the Sun.

== Personal life ==
Bingham died of a heroin overdose at age 33 on November 28, 1999, six months after marrying Harvard graduate art historian Vanessa Scharven Chase, daughter of Theodore Chase Jr., professor of biochemistry at Cook College, Rutgers University and five months before the publication of his novel.

Bingham was a close friend of musician Stephen Malkmus; Malkmus played a show at Bingham's wedding, and served as an usher at his funeral. The title of "Church on White," a song from Malkmus's debut album, Stephen Malkmus, refers to Bingham's old New York City address.

Bingham was also a friend of the late poet/musician David Berman (leader of the band Silver Jews); the song "Death Of An Heir of Sorrows", from Silver Jews' 2001 album Bright Flight, is an elegy for Bingham.

=== Legacy ===
In Bingham's honor, the PEN American Center has established the PEN/Robert W. Bingham Prize, which awards $25,000 to the most exceptionally talented fiction writer whose debut work represents distinguished literary achievement.

== Bibliography ==
- Pure Slaughter Value (1997)
- Lightning on the Sun (2000)
