= Cassie Berman =

American musician

- Born: Cassie Marie Marrett
- Origin: Louisville, Kentucky
- Genre: Indie rock
- Instruments: Vocals, bass guitar

Cassie Marie Berman (née Marrett) is an American musician. She was a member of the indie rock band Silver Jews, which was fronted by her husband David Berman. She contributed vocals and occasionally bass to the albums Bright Flight, Tanglewood Numbers, and Lookout Mountain, Lookout Sea. She also played bass and sang backup during live concerts. Berman appeared in the film Silver Jew, which chronicled the band's tour stop in Israel.

In addition, Berman also played bass on the Papa M album Hole of Burning Alms.
