= Starlite Walker =

Studio album by Silver Jews
- Released: October 24, 1994
- Recorded: June 1994
- Genre: Alternative country
- Length: 32:46
- Label: Drag City
- Producer: Davis McCain, Doug Easley, Silver Jews

Silver Jews chronology
| The Arizona Record (1993) | Starlite Walker (1994) | The Natural Bridge (1996) |

Professional ratings
Review scores
| Source | Rating |
|---|---|
| AllMusic | 4.5/5 stars |
| The Encyclopedia of Popular Music | 3/5 stars |
| Entertainment Weekly | B |
| MusicHound Rock: The Essential Album Guide | 4/5 stars |
| The New Rolling Stone Album Guide | 3.5/5 stars |
| Record Collector | 5/5 stars |

Starlite Walker is the debut studio album by American indie rock band Silver Jews. It was released in 1994 as an LP and CD on Drag City (DC55) in America and on Domino (WIG15) in Europe.

== Production ==
Starlite Walker was recorded in 1994 at Easley Recordings, in Memphis, Tennessee. It was produced by Davis McCain, Doug Easley, and the band. David Berman claimed that "Trains Across the Sea" was the first song that he ever composed.

In a documentary about the band, Berman stated that the early development of the album was influenced by his job as a security guard at the Whitney: "We were working at the Whitney with all this conceptual art, and we were learning about it … and so I thought, “Well let’s just make this record that looks like a record, and has song titles and everything, but the songs would be the ones we make at home that sound terrible.”

== Music ==
In his book Gimme Indie Rock, music journalist Andrew Earles wrote that the album "mixes '70s afternoon rock, Pavement's indie balladry, Berman's poignant lyricism, and lone troubadour folk of the '60s and '70s".

== Critical reception ==
Trouser Press wrote that "while it gets laid-back enough at times to pass for a long-lost New Riders of the Purple Sage album, Starlite Walker possesses enough temperate charm to soothe even the most savage discordophile." Drowned in Sound wrote that the album "may very well be the greatest jam session of half-formed ideas ever made."

== Track listing ==
All tracks composed by David Berman; except where indicated

1. "Introduction II"
2. "Trains Across the Sea"
3. "The Moon Is the Number 18"
4. "Advice to the Graduate"
5. "Tide to the Oceans" (Berman, Stephen Malkmus)
6. "Pan American Blues"
7. "New Orleans"
8. "The Country Diary of a Subway Conductor"
9. "Living Waters"
10. "Rebel Jew"
11. "The Silver Pageant"

== Personnel ==
=== Personnel ===
The Silver Jews

- David Berman – lead vocals, guitar, piano, percussion
- Stephen Malkmus – guitar, backing vocals, piano, bass, percussion
- Steve West – drums, backing vocals, percussion
- Bob Nastanovich – drums, backing vocals, percussion, synthesizer

Additional personnel

- Doug Easley – pedal steel guitar; whistle on "Living Waters"
- David McCain — pink noise
- Andra Sherman — triangle
- Dan Mackta — Wurlitzer electric piano on "The Country Diary of a Subway Conductor"
- David McCain – engineer, producer
- Doug Easley – engineer, producer
- Billy Smith – photography
