= Open City (magazine) =

- Categories: Literary magazine
- Frequency: three per year
- Founder: Thomas Beller and Daniel Pinchbeck
- Founded: 1991
- Final issue: 2011
- Country: United States
- Based in: New York City
- Language: English
- Website: opencity.org
- ISSN: 1089-5523

Open City Magazine and Books was a New York City-based magazine and book publisher that featured many first-time writers alongside those who are well known. The editors were Thomas Beller and Joanna Yas.

== History and profile ==
Thomas Beller and Daniel Pinchbeck founded the magazine in 1991, and were soon joined by Robert Bingham, who in 1999 founded the book series. It was published by a nonprofit organization, Open City, Inc. Open City Magazine was produced three times per year. Open City Books released two to four books per year. Their first book was a collection of poetry by David Berman. The magazine and books were distributed to the trade by Publishers Group West.

Writers published in the magazine include Mary Gaitskill, Richard Yates, Irvine Welsh, David Foster Wallace, Robert Stone, Martha McPhee, Nick Tosches, Denis Johnson, Rick Moody, Michael Cunningham, Jonathan Ames, Sam Lipsyte, Joe Andoe, David Berman, Jonathan Baumbach, Joshua Beckman, Matthew Rohrer, Matthew Zapruder, Anselm Berrigan, Jill Bialosky, Hakim Bey, Jason Brown, Bliss Broyard, Rachel Sherman, Charles Bukowski, Robert Olen Butler, Emily Carter, Alexander Chancellor, Bryan Charles, Alfred Chester, Christopher Sorrentino, Delmore Schwartz, Cyril Connolly, Adrian Dannatt, Thomas Beller, Meghan Daum, Rick DeMarinis, Rodney Jack, Catherine Bowman, Geoff Dyer, Alicia Erian, Edward Field, Nick Flynn, Ford Madox Ford, Bruce Jay Friedman, Rivka Galchen, Deborah Garrison, Mark Gonzales, Dana Goodyear, Joyce Johnson, Hettie Jones, Daniil Kharms, Wayne Koestenbaum, James Lasdun, Monica Lewinsky, Viktor Pelevin, Rebecca Wolff, Kevin Young, and C.K. Williams.

The magazine's discontinuation was announced in March 2011. It published 30 issues during its existence.

== Published books ==
- Actual Air by David Berman (1999)
- Venus Drive by Sam Lipsyte (2000)
- My Misspent Youth by Meghan Daum (2001)
- World on Fire by Michael Brownstein (2002)
- Some Hope by Edward St Aubyn (2003)
- Karoo by Steve Tesich (2004)
- Goodbye, Goodness by Sam Brumbaugh (2005)
- Mother's Milk by Edward St Aubyn (2006)
- The First Hurt by Rachel Sherman (2006)
- Love Without by Jerry Stahl (2007)
- Long Live a Hunger to Feed Each Other by Jerome Badanes (2007)
- Why the Devil Chose New England for His Work by Jason Brown (2007)
- Farewell Navigator by Leni Zumas (2008)
- Living Room by Rachel Sherman (2009)

== See also ==
- List of literary magazines
