= Rachel Sherman (author) =

American writer (born 1975)

- Born: 1975 (age 50–51)
- Education: Columbia University (MFA)
- Occupation: Writer

Rachel Sherman (born 1975) is an American writer. She holds an MFA in fiction from Columbia University. Her short stories have appeared in McSweeney's, Open City, Post Road, Conjunctions, n+1, and Story Quarterly, among other publications, and in the book Full Frontal Fiction: The Best of Nerve Anthology.

Her short story collection, The First Hurt, was released by Open City Books in April 2006 to rave reviews, culminating in the nomination for the 2006 Frank O'Connor International Short Story Award in Ireland.
