= Bright Flight =

Studio album by Silver Jews
- Released: November 20, 2001
- Studios: Hum Depot, Berry Hill, TN
- Genre: Indie rock
- Length: 35:18
- Labels: Drag City; Domino
- Producer: Mark Nevers

Silver Jews chronology
American Water (1998)	Bright Flight (2001)	Tanglewood Numbers (2005)

Bright Flight is the fourth studio album by American indie rock band Silver Jews, released in 2001.

"Tennessee" was chosen as the title track for an EP that also included "Long Long Gone", "I'm Gonna Love the Hell Out of You", and "Turn Your Guns Around".

== Critical reception ==
Professional ratings
Review scores
Source	Rating
AllMusic	4/5 stars
Drowned in Sound	6/10
The Encyclopedia of Popular Music	3/5 stars
The Guardian	4/5 stars
Pitchfork	8.5/10
The New Rolling Stone Album Guide	3.5/5 stars
Stylus Magazine	B

The Guardian wrote: "Fusing gorgeous, tear-sodden country melodies with lyrics that inspire love and anxiety in equal measure, Bright Flight poetically captures a drunken night spent contemplating suicide while staring at the Nashville skyline." The Stranger wrote that "the stories told and the places visited are rich with radiant imagery--not always happy, but encouraging in their pure, honest existence." Trouser Press wrote that the album "is not, on the whole, as agreeably encompassing as American Water, it is the work of an artist increasingly able to get to the emotional heart of a song without relying on the crutches of irony and overt cleverness."

== Track listing ==
All tracks are written by David Berman, except "Friday Night Fever", written by Blake Mevis, Dean Dillon and Frank Dycus.

No.	Title	Length
1.	"Slow Education"	3:07
2.	"Room Games and Diamond Rain"	4:34
3.	"Time Will Break the World"	3:17
4.	"I Remember Me"	5:32
5.	"Horseleg Swastikas"	3:20
6.	"Transylvania Blues"	3:03
7.	"Let's Not and Say We Did"	2:59
8.	"Tennessee"	4:10
9.	"Friday Night Fever"	2:44
10.	"Death of an Heir of Sorrows"	2:35
Total length:		35:18

== Personnel ==
Musicians

- David Berman - lead vocals, guitar
- Cassie Berman - vocals on "Slow Education", "Let's Not and Say We Did", and "Tennessee", bass
- William Tyler - guitar, vocals on "Let's Not and Say We Did"
- Mike Fellows - bass
- Tim Barnes - drums, percussion
- Paul Niehaus - pedal steel guitar
- Tony Crow - piano, organ, electric piano, synthesizer, vocals on "Let's Not and Say We Did" and "Friday Night Fever"

Additional Personnel

- Hilary Small - artwork
- Mark Nevers - engineer, producer
- Mike Fellows - assistant producer
