= Lightning on the Sun =

- Cover
- Author: Robert Bingham
- Language: English
- Publication date: 2000

Lightning on the Sun (2000) is the only novel by Robert Bingham, published after his death in 1999.

The novel relates how Asher, a "privileged young man", travels to Cambodia and wrestles with, amongst other things, drug addiction and trouble with a loan shark. In the New York Times, Stacey D'Erasmo highlighted Bingham's "wicked sense of humor" and stated that the book reaches its peak in quality when Bingham's writing is at its "most nihilistic, when he lets the devils play." In a review of the novel, Publishers Weekly commented that Bingham "might have become one of the strongest (writers) of his generation." The novel was partly inspired by Bingham's own time spent in Cambodia.
