= Hudson Bell =

Hudson Bell is an American indie rock band from San Francisco. The group is named for lead member Hudson Bell himself, who is the guitar player, vocalist, and songwriter.

His work has garnered strong reviews in Pitchfork with a 7.4/10 rating (When the sun is the moon), describing it as a “rich, delicate album”. New noise magazine recommended The latest release, Yerba Buena, heartily. Describing the albums place in the rock spectrum as “full of the nervous tension that defined the early days of alternative rock, and unfolds like nostalgia laced with modern day anthemic and turbulent indie-rock”.

Attributes that remind reviewers of the Idaho-based indie rock band Built to Spill include long songs that emphasize detailed guitar work, pensive lyrics, unhurried vocal style, and a voice that sometimes closely recalls Built to Spill's Doug Martsch. Pandora Radio lists Galaxie 500, Black Cab, Pavement, and Superchunk as similar artists.

== Members ==
- Hudson Bell (guitar, vocals, harmonica)
- John Slater (bass guitar, piano, keyboards)
- Brian Fraser (drums)

== Discography ==
- "Under Boxes and Dirt" (solo, 1999)
- "Captain of the Old Girls" (2002)
- "When the Sun is the Moon" (2005)
- "Out of the Clouds" (2010)
- "Yerba Buena" (2016)
