= David Berman (musician) =

American musician and poet (1967–2019)

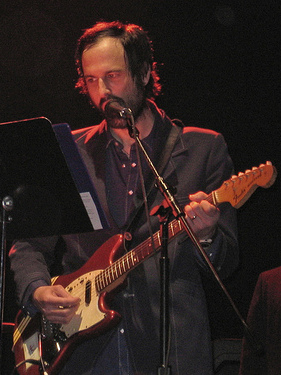
- Berman performing with Silver Jews at Webster Hall in 2006
- Born: David Craig Berman; January 4, 1967; Williamsburg, Virginia, U.S.
- Died: August 7, 2019 (aged 52); New York City, U.S.
- Education: University of Virginia; University of Massachusetts Amherst
- Occupations: Musician; singer; cartoonist; poet
- Years active: 1989–2009; 2019
- Spouse: Cassie Marrett (m. 1999; sep. 2018)
- Father: Richard Berman
- Musical career
- Origin: Hoboken, New Jersey, U.S.
- Genres: Indie rock; country rock
- Instruments: Vocals; guitar
- Label: Drag City
- Formerly of: Ectoslavia; Silver Jews; Purple Mountains

David Cloud Berman (born David Craig Berman; January 4, 1967 – August 7, 2019) was an American musician, singer-songwriter and poet. He founded – and was the only constant member of – the indie rock band Silver Jews. Originally founded with Stephen Malkmus and Bob Nastanovich, the Silver Jews went through several iterations of band members.

Initially lo-fi and increasingly country-inspired, Berman helped develop the sound of the band and provided the lyrical material. His lyrical themes often overlapped with his poetry, of which he published one volume, Actual Air. His lyrics were multifaceted and cynical, often discussing his struggle with substance abuse and depression. These struggles culminated in a suicide attempt in 2003, after which he underwent rehabilitation, engaged with Judaism, and toured for the first time; soon, however, he dissolved the band and largely withdrew from public life.

After several years of seclusion, he decided to return to music, adopting the stage name Purple Mountains and releasing an eponymous album in July 2019. A month after its release, he died by suicide. Purple Mountains was well received critically, and garnered acclaim from his dedicated following. He is regarded as a significant and influential indie rock cult figure.

== Biography ==
=== Early life ===
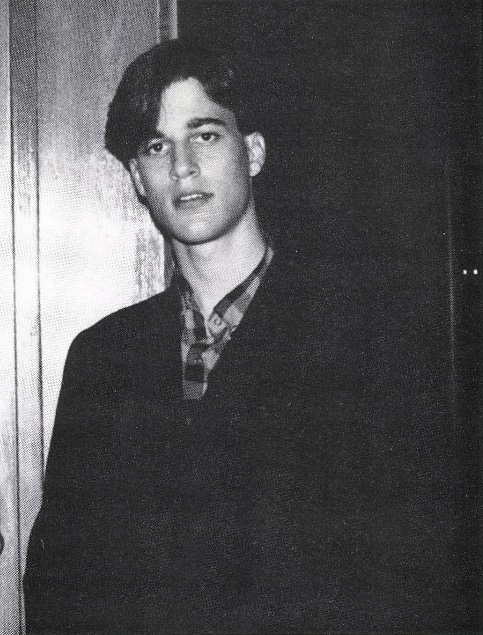
Berman as a high-school senior, circa 1984–85

David Craig Berman was born on January 4, 1967, in Williamsburg, Virginia. At that time, his father Richard Berman worked as an attorney practicing labor law for the United States Chamber of Commerce, while his mother was a housewife. He came from a secular Jewish family, lacking in literary or artistic inclinations. Raised mostly in Texas, he did not personally know or interact with many other Jews but maintained an identification beyond his youth, although with little religiosity.

Berman's parents divorced when he was seven. Thereafter, he split time between each parent's household until he entered college. His father relocated to Dallas for a position as a lobbyist on behalf of foodservice businesses, while his mother moved back in with her parents in Wooster, Ohio, and became a teacher. He later described his childhood as "grindingly painful" and said he kept "mostly independent of family things" into his adulthood. During his adolescence, his father rose to prominence as a corporate lobbyist representing firearms, alcohol, and other industries; by this point Berman had come to dislike him. He was "forced" to live with his father after 1979, despite his own wishes to the contrary, due to his father's concern he was "growing up to be a wimp".

He attended high school at Greenhill School in Addison, Texas. During his teenage years, his father sent him to see a psychiatrist. Berman suffered from depression throughout his life and later said the condition had become resistant to treatment. By the age of 15, he said he began taking "every drug in every way", and said he had smoked PCP every day during his second year of college.

For Berman, Dallas' burgeoning new wave scene served as an early source of musical inspiration. He took an interest in a friend's rare Fairlight keyboard, and in the likes of Art of Noise, Prefab Sprout, X, the Replacements, the Cure, New Order, and Echo and the Bunnymen. Hoping to imitate the lyrics of Jello Biafra and Exene Cervenka, he began experimenting with poetry by writing to high school girlfriends. (Note: He considered the line "A cartoon lake. Wolf on skates" to be his first true foray into poetry.) He read Henry Miller's The Rosy Crucifixion when he was 14, which he said provided him with "permission to enjoy life". Reading significantly in his life, Berman said, reinforced his empathy, especially for those also troubled; he cited William Faulkner as an influence.

Berman went to the University of Virginia in 1985. He had been, by his own admission, "too lazy" to apply to college, so his father's secretary completed and submitted applications on his behalf. At university, Berman met fellow students Stephen Malkmus, Bob Nastanovich, and James McNew. He frequently attended concerts, shared records, and discussed obscure bands with Malkmus and Nastanovich, having first encountered the former in a carpool to a show. The quartet formed the band Ectoslavia. He graduated in 1989 with a bachelor's degree in English literature.

=== Origin of Silver Jews: 1989–1994 ===
Upon graduation, Berman, Malkmus, and Nastanovich moved to Hoboken, New Jersey, where they shared an apartment. In 1989, they adopted the band name Silver Jews and recorded discordant tapes in their living room – that same year, Malkmus' band Pavement released their debut extended play (EP), Slay Tracks: 1933–1969. Malkmus and Berman worked as security guards at The Whitney Museum of American Art, and Berman was inspired by some of the museum's collection (such as the art of Bruce Nauman, Jean-Michel Basquiat, Sherri Levine and Louise Lawler). He wrote lyrics and poems while working shifts at the museum, occasionally in collaboration with Malkmus, who along with Berman would "get high" at Central Park on their lunch breaks. According to Berman's longtime friend Kevin Guthrie, Malkmus and Berman had a harmonious friendship, and Nastanovich revered both artists' creativity. "It was mostly drinking beer and seeing grunge bands", Malkmus said regarding this time period and recalled that Berman appeared as a somewhat "scary goth" but was kind and enthusiastic, strongly desiring to be involved with Jewish culture.

Though Berman sometimes felt irritated by a common view that Silver Jews were merely a side project to Pavement, the connection led to his signing with indie label Drag City, which would later release all of his albums. The band's relation to Pavement was responsible for them amassing a "national audience", a notice great enough that the resulting sales meant Berman did not have to tour. The band's first extended-plays (EPs) Dime Map of the Reef and The Arizona Record were not commercially successful but gained them attention. Kim Gordon was an admirer and Will Oldham said Dime Map of the Reef inspired him to send recordings to Drag City.

Following the EPs, Berman began studying for a master's degree in poetry at the University of Massachusetts Amherst. Dubbing this time an "academic exile", Matthew Shaer, in a 2006 Boston Globe article, speculated that Berman's extended time studying may have been an attempt to distance himself from Pavement. In 2003, Berman himself reflected upon his postgraduate experience: after "meet[ing] grown dignified men who play with fucking words all day," he felt he had "permission to believe that I could try for that life". He attempted to have poems published in the American Poetry Review but was rejected, which increased his interest in music, "despite scarcely knowing how to sing or play guitar". By 2005, Berman's public appearances mostly consisted of poetry readings. (Note: The year prior, some reasons for the locations he chose for his readings were as follows: a favor for Drag City and Open City, a publisher of Berman's poetry; a desire to visit a new place; being able to stop over at an old friend's house; being able to benefit the "Arkansas literacy project" and to be "the object of an assembly [at Greenhill School]".)

By October 1994, Silver Jews had enough material for their debut album Starlite Walker. The release established respect in the indie rock scene, although with some detractors. Malkmus and Nastanovich's involvement with Pavement meant they were unavailable for the next Silver Jews album The Natural Bridge, and only Berman and Peyton Pinkerton continued writing for it. Pavement's success proved difficult for Berman, who became suspicious of fame and resented the people with whom he interacted, deeming them "cruel". He felt somewhat abandoned by Malkmus and Nastanovich, although he understood the circumstances permitted little else. Berman's personal life was affected by the deaths of friends, which would influence his songwriting. A close friendship between Oldham and Berman arose at this time and the two conceptualized—although never released—a collaborative project, entitled Silver Palace.

Silver Jews was part of a "moment in underground music" of songwriters who looked to the 1970s and 1980s for inspiration, and were one of Drag City's seminal groups alongside Smog, Pavement, Royal Trux, and Palace, bands that "made American music frightening again by tapping into its most tangled roots". Berman wished to "distinguish his brand of songwriting from the depressive-narcissistic strain of 1990s rock" and later sought to break away from Drag City's "cryptic and prankish" style. The line-up of Silver Jews constantly changed around Berman, who remained its principal songwriter and "main creative driver" and led the band's creative direction since the start. "Malkmus and Nastanovich [were] there to serve his ideas more than offer their own," said Ian Gormely of Exclaim!.

=== Critical acclaim and substance abuse: 1996–2001 ===
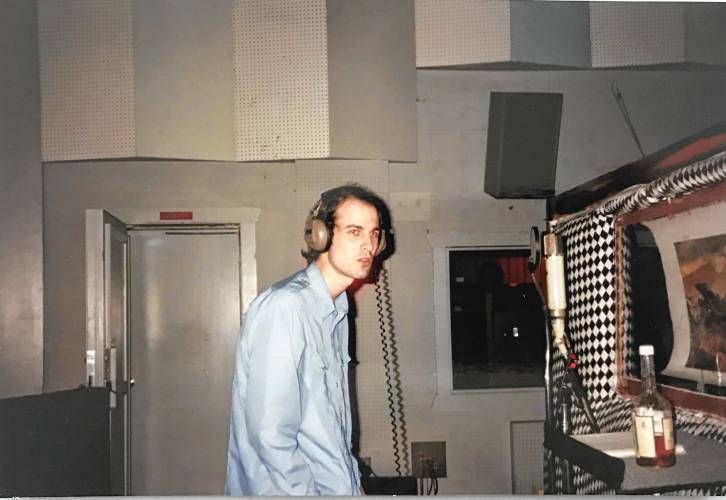
Berman in 1995

The composition of The Natural Bridge (1996) left Berman distraught; he appeared to be "haunted by ghosts" and was hospitalized with sleep deprivation. "When the songs were being recorded, things got darker in my life", he recollected, also noting that "recording was a process of calming myself down"—although doing so was so "searing that I couldn't listen to music". His conduct and demands were eccentric and, according to Oldham, the album's producer Mark Nevers "had sort of held Berman's hand".

Although it received positive reviews in music publications—Berman having now "established himself as a world-class rock lyricist"—he chose not to tour due to a fear of performing. During this time, Berman thought of touring as too significant a commitment and considered the stress to be intolerable. Playing live appeared to him as "like some unnecessary post-invention marketing effort" and had not elicited much "satisfaction" when he had done so. After The Natural Bridge, Berman decided he wanted Malkmus and Nastanovich, both of whom felt betrayed by Berman's hostility toward them, to be involved with all subsequent Silver Jews albums.

The pain that Berman felt around The Natural Bridge helped him to formulate a new Silver Jews album with Malkmus, American Water. It was significant to Berman and the band's progression. They had now "stepped out of Pavement's shadow ... This was clearly his project and represented his vision", his songwriting having been at the foreground of the former album. By this point he felt confident in his musical career. Berman's drug use continued, and he was using them during studio sessions. Despite his personal turmoil, Berman wanted the album to be joyous like "other people['s] records" rather than grim. The band intended to tour in late 1998 but plans were ended after a fistfight led to his eardrum rupturing.

Actual Air, Berman's first collection of poetry was released in 1999 by Open City Books, which had been founded to publish the collection. Actual Air amassed critical acclaim—Carl Wilson called it "even better than [Berman's] albums". The collection included new poems as well as excerpts from his UMass Amherst master's thesis, "Ruined Entrances" The book's unusually high sales of over 20,000 copies bolstered Berman's musical career. Its marketing was akin to that of an album, which contributed to its success; Drag City and record stores were the avenues from which a "significant portion of those sales" arose. In 2001, he was offered a job as poet-in-residence on a postgraduate course. The prospect thrilled Berman; however, he chose not to apply out of apprehension. Four years later, when asked in an interview if he would accept a lecturing role at university, he expressed uncertainty on genuinely taking an offer: "I should stay away from the rock clubs and the English departments if I can."

Although he did publish some poems afterward—his poetry is featured in journals such as The Baffler, Open City and The Believer—and had reported working on a follow-up, Actual Air remained his only book of poetry. In his later years, Berman stopped writing poetry because of diminished motivation and a feeling of partial inadequacy in comparison to younger poets; another collection failed to materialize due to a lack of purpose and innovation. Scraps of his unpublished work were compiled by fans into the unofficial anthology "The Colonial Manuscript". Pieces of writing also survive on his blog. By 2003, his perception of song-writing and poetry as unified was no more, and felt that older age rendered him less capable of working in both mediums. "Poetry can never counter-propaganda. A song might be able to."

Around this time, Berman, who no longer "[had] to work", estimated he made $23,000 a year; by 2001, he earned $45,000 from his music. That year saw the release of the Silver Jews album Bright Flight, which featured his wife Cassie Berman. Their relationship started two years earlier at a party; Berman awoke in Cassie's house and learned she owned every Silver Jews album. "I was really depressed and had nothing to lose at that time. I was so ugly". Cassie was a source of relief for Berman and she helped him feel young, Berman later considering their relationship the "best thing that ever happened to me". They lived together in Nashville for 19 years, where they moved to aid Berman's music career; later buying a house there alleviated quandaries for Berman; it was a relief to Berman to live in a city where he felt pursuing a career in music was well accepted.

Berman began to take hard drugs in 1998, during a period of depression. He started to take heroin, methamphetamine and crack cocaine, with his use of cocaine reaching the point of addiction; he sought existential insight from drugs but eventually his dependency led to reclusion and dejection. Several of Berman's friends died in the following years, including Robert Bingham, the founder and editor of Open City, who died in 1999 after a heroin overdose. Berman twice unintentionally overdosed; one incident followed the release party for Bright Flight. That album's darker sound reflected his struggles with substance abuse.

=== Attempted suicide, rehabilitation and career progression: 2003–2008 ===
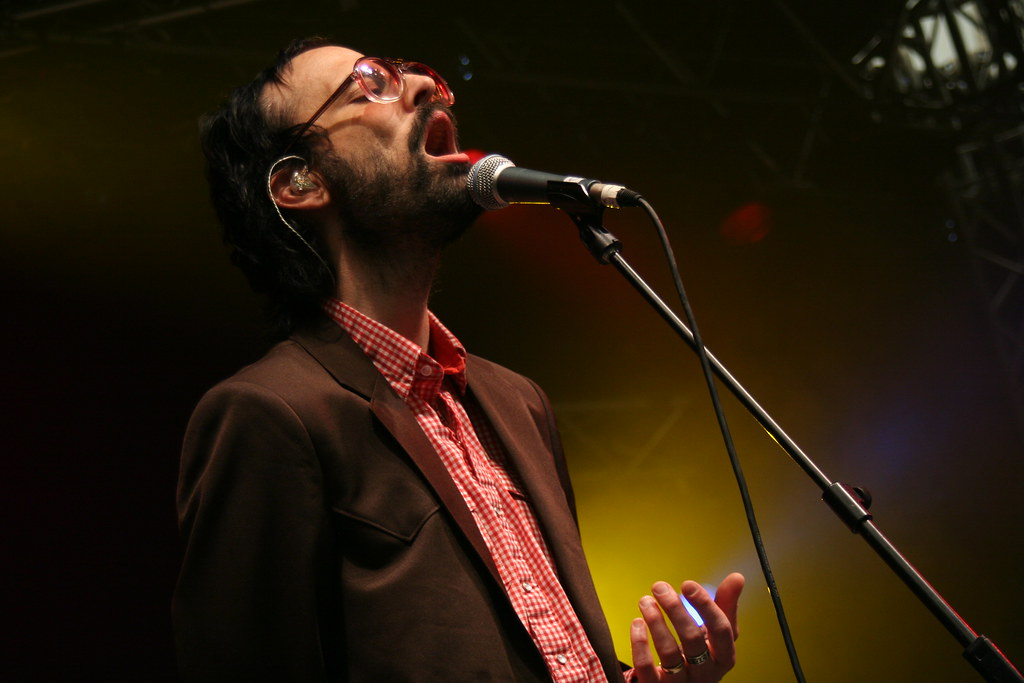
Berman performing at All Tomorrow's Parties in 2008

On November 19, 2003, Berman attempted suicide in Nashville by consuming crack cocaine, alcohol and tranquilizers. He wrote a short note to Cassie—the brevity of which Berman would later regret—put on his wedding suit, and went to a "crack house" he frequented. When discovered by Cassie, he verbally lashed out and refused treatment. He was eventually taken to Vanderbilt University Medical Center, awakening three days later.

Around a year later, Berman checked in for drug rehabilitation, which was paid for by his father, and encouraged by his mother and Cassie. Berman said he had relapsed but that by August 2005 he was not using drugs. During his rehabilitation, Berman embraced Judaism, choosing to study the Torah and sought to be a "better person" who was "easier" to Cassie and staff at Drag City; he would soon consider Judaism as an integral aspect of his life, to which he intended to devote himself. Reading the Torah helped him learn more about poetry; David, described in the Hebrew Bible as a king of the United Monarchy of Israel and Judah, was also an influence of Berman's. He described Judaism as having an affirmative effect on his life.

Reflecting upon his suicide attempt, Berman noted that he was not unprivileged and without career opportunities, although this was not evident to him at the time. He began to excessively take antidepressants, and his sobriety made him more candid. In 2005, and by means of "saving [himself]", Silver Jews, with a lineup including Cassie, Malkmus, Nastanovich, Bobby Bare Jr., Paz Lenchantin, and William Tyler, released Tanglewood Numbers. Soon after, the band began to tour, with 100 shows from 2006 to 2009 taking place; to cope with the hectic nature, he became "a daily pot smoker". Before Berman toured, he occasionally made caricatures of fans, considering them more rewarding.

By this time, Silver Jews had sold 250,000 records. Berman and Cassie still experienced financial difficulties; Cassie worked an office job and Berman struggled to get medical insurance for the removal of a keratoconus, although he was eventually insured by the Country Music Association. In 2005, Jeremy Blake enlisted Berman for Sodium Fox, a conceptual artwork centered around Berman. Blake's suicide and Berman's eye operation would affect the next Silver Jews album—before the operation Berman reported feeling "less aggressive and less tenacious". Lookout Mountain, Lookout Sea was released in 2008 to lukewarm reviews. The album was their most commercially successful.

Berman's decision to tour, no longer dependent on drugs, was based upon his greater age, his expanded discography, and a desire to interact with his audience, which "softened his naturally gruff exterior". Berman found touring with Cassie eased the experience, of which he had mixed feelings. He considered her a necessary component, and noted that if he was alone he would likely act to his detriment.

=== Hiatus from music: 2009–2017 ===
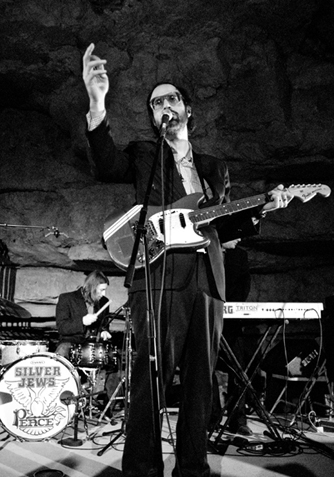
Berman at the final Silver Jews show on January 31, 2009

On January 22, 2009, Berman disbanded Silver Jews, and their final show was played the following week at Cumberland Caverns in McMinnville, Tennessee. "I always said we would stop before we got bad", he said, and, during the performance at Cumberland Caverns, claimed that "I always wanted to go out on top, but I much prefer this". According to Nashville Scene's Sean L. Maloney, due to Silver Jews' impact on Nashville's mid-2000s music scene, the final show meant "a chapter in this city's artistic evolution closed".

Alongside the news of the band's dissolution, Berman publicly announced, for the first time, that his father was the lobbyist Richard Berman, who he viewed as markedly loathsome and from whom he had been estranged since 2006. Berman reported owing Richard money, and once donated to a supposed investigation of Richard, initiated by the watchdog group Citizens for Responsibility and Ethics in Washington, who called upon the Internal Revenue Service's intervention. Upon considering the commercialization of modern musicians, he began to see his and Richard's lives intertwining; Berman's guilt about his father and said consideration were the reasons he retired Silver Jews, saying:

This winter I decided that [Silver Jews] were too small of a force to ever come close to undoing a millionth of all the harm he has caused … Previously I thought through songs and poems and drawings I could find and build a refuge away from his world, but there is the matter of Justice. And I'll tell you it's not just a metaphor. The desire for it actually burns. It hurts. There needs to be something more.

After Silver Jews disbanded, Berman became a recluse. The "hermit, solitary aspect to the way [Berman] live[d]" predated this time, according to a 2008 interview—and Nastanovich reflected two years earlier that Berman had "gotten more reclusive". In 2005, posed with the question of whether he had chosen between vulgarity or loneliness, Berman said "it's been loneliness up till now but it looks like things are changing for the better/worse". His public perception became intertwined with fiction—significant speculation upon the events of his suicide attempt had reportedly occurred before this time. His seclusion, according to Steven Hyden of Uproxx, constructed a perceived "mythology".

Berman published a 2009 book of surreal, minimalist cartoons called The Portable February to mixed reviews. He later worked with German artist Friedrich Kunath on the book You Owe Me a Feeling (2012), with paintings by Kunath and poetry by Berman. Cassie sought a career in pediatric therapy. In 2010, Berman spoke about his difficulties with writing a book about his father—seeking to become his "nemesis"; HBO nearly adapted the book, but Berman cancelled production, saying he did not want to glamorize his father. In an article about Berman, Derek Robertson said that a significant amount of his personal life was an "explicit rebuke" to Richard and an attempt to evade institutional power—Thomas Beller interpreted Berman's disdain as both political and personal.

By 2016, Berman had experienced the deaths of both his friend Dave Cloud and his mother, which compelled him to adopt Cloud as his middle name, and write the song "I Loved Being My Mother's Son". He was still in contact with Malkmus and maintained a close relationship with Silver Jews drummer Brian Kotzur. According to Nastanovich, at one point Berman intended to write new Silver Jews songs; he ultimately became more interested in a new style. As noted by Jewish Currents' Nathan Goldman, Berman soon "inaugurated...a different artistic phase with a series of songs about the disappointments of expectations unfulfilled", contrasting the "odes to the open field of possibility" that closely preceded the Silver Jews' conclusion.

=== Purple Mountains and death: 2018–2019 ===
In 2018, Berman and Cassie separated. Lacking money and living off royalties from Drag City, from June he lived in a room above the label's Chicago office. According to Berman, Cassie and he "never had the kind of conflict that results in divorce" but had a "kind of need to live [their] lives without the other one". Berman thought his chronic depression meant he was "unfit to be anyone's husband". He and Cassie maintained a shared bank account and owned a house together, and he considered her an integral part of his family. He briefly lived in Miller Beach, in Gary, Indiana. At one point, he asked a friend to give him heroin but was refused, for which he was ultimately grateful, having not used heroin or cocaine since October 2003.

He had grown disillusioned with Judaism, saying his belief in God lasted from 2004 to 2010; in 2008 he voiced a disconnect from Judaism, positioning himself as adjacent to Jews. In his withdrawal, he "[fixed] himself in Jewish tradition", said Goldman and Arielle Angel of Jewish Currents, viewing Berman as archetypal of Jews. His once-passion for Judaism made him eager to tour Israel; there he met Yonatan Gat and helped get him signed to Drag City—"[The] shows we played in Israel were pretty much the most amazing experience of my life". In 2018, Berman co-produced Gat's album Universalists. By that year, Berman had conceptualized a more conspicuous return to music: a new name, Purple Mountains.

Following the release of two singles under his new name, an eponymous debut album was released in July 2019. An "instantly mythologized" album, Berman received heightened attention and very positive reviews: "Purple Mountains looked like the start to an unexpected second act for David Berman". Berman worked on Purple Mountains with Woods and Berman's friend Dan Auerbach, with whom he had worked in 2015; Auerbach called Berman "one of [his] heroes".

Berman's financial difficulties, the breakdown of his marriage, and encouragement from Drag City's president Dan Koretzky were impetuses for Berman's new music. Berman hoped to resolve the $100,000 of loan and credit card debt he had amassed as a result of his drug use; in a 2005 interview, he said: "I've got a credit card rotisserie system that would dazzle the ancients". He stated this was the only reason he intended to tour. Berman discussed the idea of a collaborative tour with Bill Callahan and Oldham, which ultimately did not occur. He expressed worries about the tour and notified the accompanying band that his depression may interfere but was excited for his "solitude to end".

In March 2019, Berman said: "There were probably 100 nights over the last 10 years where I was sure I wouldn't make it to the morning". Berman hanged himself on August 7, 2019, in an apartment in Park Slope, Brooklyn, New York. It is not clear whether his suicide was spontaneous or deliberated upon; according to The Philadelphia Inquirer's Dan DeLuca: "The warning signs were all over Purple Mountains". Will Reisman of SF Weekly reflected that by the time of Purple Mountains' release, Berman appeared as a "grim visage...Tinted sunglasses covered a set of weary, stricken eyes, his neck-length hair was thinning and reedy, and a pursed, lifeless expression graced [his] face". A private funeral attended by "Friends and family, along with the Jewish community" took place on August 16; a memorial, by filmmaker Lance Bangs at New York's Met Breuer Museum, the former location of the Whitney, was held earlier.

== Artistry ==
=== Lyrics ===
"Random Rules"
Accompanied by Malkmus, Berman sings lyrics, in a deadpan and wry manner, which have been said to evoke dadaist poetry. It has been called "the quintessential Jews tune".

"All My Happiness is Gone"
"Favor[ing] idiomatic precision in place of poetic specificity", Berman laments the state of his friendships, as a two-chord acoustic guitar progression plays; evocative of older country tunes, and, in delivery, Berman's earlier work. (Note: Dan Bejar, who worked with Berman in the early recording sessions of Purple Mountains, reflected that there once were "lots of really wild lines that would have fit in more with '90s Berman—just blasting images, more manic, which was actually the state he was in". As the process continued, Berman became disinterested in said lyrical material, hoping to explore new avenues, and resultingly abandoning the previous work.)

Having given up on albums because he was unable to complete the lyrics, Berman spent most of his creative time working on the lyrics, to the point of obsession; Koretzky reportedly saw Berman spend months working on a single line. Berman's process involved considering his audience's understanding; he juxtaposed his abstract lyrics with simple melodies and rhyme schemes. To his chagrin, he recalled a disconnect to his audience—"an indie rock crowd"—while writing Bright Flight due to the dysfunctional lives of his associates. He had a didactic approach with Tanglewood Numbers and Lookout Mountain, Lookout Sea, wanting to give "instructions" on forgoing depression with the former. Mark Richardson, writing for Pitchfork, and Randall Roberts of the Los Angeles Times, noted Berman's proficiency for minimalist compression.

Berman's songs often use country music tropes and his themes tend to focus on music, nature, beauty, disconnection, drugs, sports, America, and God. An influence on his writing, Berman thought highly of America although hoped for a "redemption". His artistic perception of America has been noted as idiosyncratic, narrow and poignant, while forlornness often arose as humor. Religion is a recurring element in Silver Jews albums, while Purple Mountains evokes Jewish mysticism.

From Bright Flight onwards, his lyrics became more autobiographical, in a dramatic framework, and he came to view the preceding works as "make-believe"; on Tanglewood Numbers he documented his struggle with substance abuse. Roberts called Purple Mountains "nearly as autobiographical as a memoir". Berman discussed his isolation, divorce—Silver Jews songs about Cassie having been plentiful—and death, which had a particular presence. By this point, his music had less humor, misdirection, irony or embellishment; he was interested in being direct.

On the Silver Jews albums, Berman represented his alienation via substitutes, his characters composed of traits originating from either real-life people, fictional characters or archetypes. His fictional narratives often start relatively straightforwardly and then become bizarre; the songs of American Water conjure an "absurdist landscape" and "grow more obtuse in proportion to tunefulness". His stories present a literary aesthetic that is "equal parts rural shack and gothic zen" and his characters often reside in "half-empty country-and-western bars and backwater burgs".

Having found a wider audience with Actual Air, Berman's lyrics were held to a higher standard; and he has been praised for diverging from his peers. His lyrics have contributed to his recognition as influential in the sphere of indie rock and beyond.

=== Sound ===
Silver Jews' early work is defined by an ultra lo-fi aesthetic, starting as ostensibly "avant-gardist" within the framework of "traditional" pop songs. Their work before Starlite Walker is "regarded as the lowest fidelity recordings of the first lo-fi movement". The changing line-up influenced the sound, Berman's musical approach became simplified and the band moved further towards a country sound; Purple Mountains eschewed the previous punk rock strand. Purple Mountains is Berman's most direct, conventional album, said Spencer Kornhaber of The Atlantic, although all of Berman's discography is relatively conventional. Berman's vocal delivery has been identified as brusque, dry and mostly uninflected—his register was described as baritone and he would concurrently sing and speak. Reviewing Starlite Walker for The Guardian, Jonathan Romney described Berman's approach as "whiny, archetypally slackerish" with "vaguely country inflections"—the early country aspects being mostly humorous.

Silver Jews' songs were often sparse, usually with three or four chords, of novice difficulty. Berman understood his musical abilities were limited, the lo-fi sound initially obscuring his abilities. For a while, he wondered as to why he was without natural talent, eventually renouncing his creative insecurity and becoming assertive in his design.

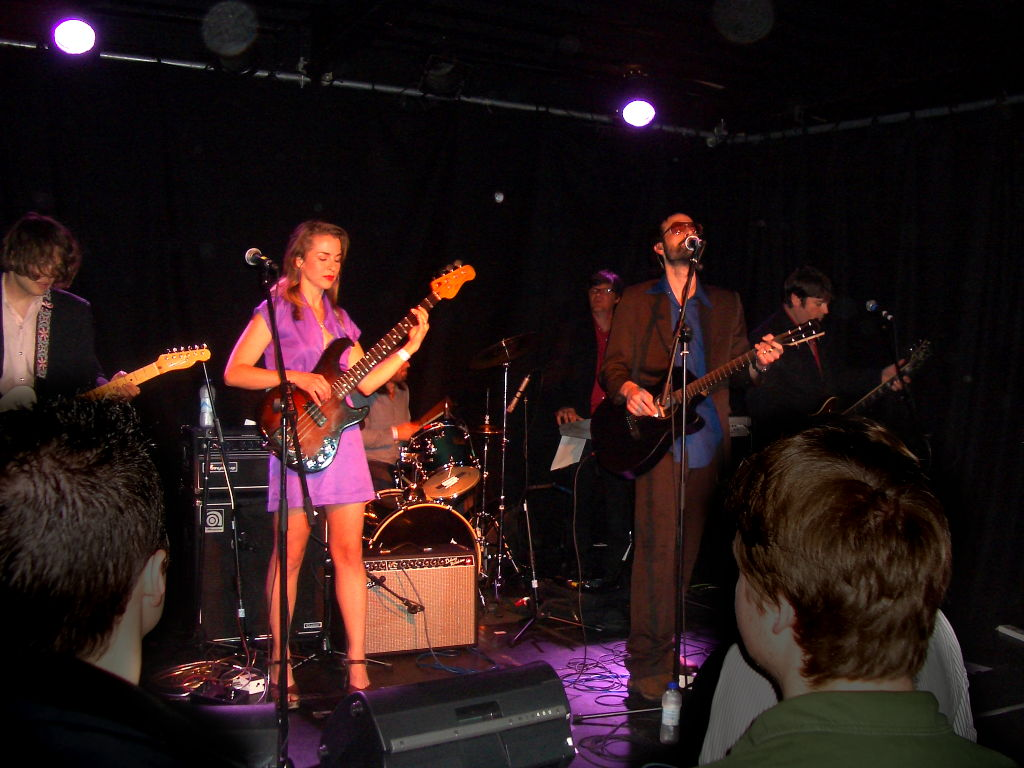
Cassie and David in 2008

Berman spent significant time without playing his guitar and said his process of creating albums began with conceptualization and then daily refinement, typically writing the music first. For the first four Silver Jews albums, Berman wrote all the songs. Malkmus and Berman had differing approaches and were "longtime musical foil[s]". With Tanglewood Numbers, Berman exercised greater care and control—Shaer observed soon after its release that the album "represents Berman's most comprehensive effort to focus his songwriting" with Tom Ridge, writing for Wire, noting that it showcased distance from similarities between Silver Jews and Pavement. (Note: Ridge wrote that the "undeniable similarities in sound" are such that Berman's "immersion in a kind of offbeat Americana sounds a lot like an imagined future if Pavement had used 'Range Life' as their template.")

Cassie and Berman "shared a brightening chemistry", the former's calm disposition onstage provided stability to Berman's electric presence. Everett True and Berman concurred that he was a natural performer. Berman also performed in a rigid manner, reading sheet music "like it's a literary reading"; Marc Hirsh of the Boston Globe said Berman used a music stand to create a barrier between himself and the audience. Cassie compared Berman's early showmanship to a child beginning to ride a bicycle. She did recall that their first performance belied his reluctance, as he was talkative to the extensive audience.

=== Poetry ===
Berman began to write poems in response to insecurities concerning his musical abilities, the prospect arising from a competitive spirit. With regards to composition, he allocated the same time to both: two or three hours, in a daily manner, poetry being the more vigorous undertaking. His writings all saw extensive and meticulous rewriting, which he was initially averse to. He began to pursue the prospect of publication by age 22—two years before, by his judgement, his "first worthwhile song". Although his lyrics and poetry remain distinct from each other, critics have found they share certain defining characteristics, such as:

- direct delivery;
- literary wit;
- picturesque descriptions;
- allusions to Judaism;
- forsaken subjects;
- themes of American culture, absurdism and everyday melancholy;
- and an entanglement of reality and symbolism, often in the form of civic imagery.

Unlike his music, Berman's poetry did not rhyme and the poems in Actual Air were written in free verse—he composed his poems using written notes and disclosed that he "didn't know anything about form, rhythm or meter", surmising his structure to be accidental or instinctual. Berman has mentioned various poets as influences of his: James Tate—discernible via a similar and blunt approach to surrealism and, in Actual Air, per style and focus upon location and person; Russell Edson, Kenneth Koch, Wallace Stevens, Charles Wright and Emily Dickinson.

Berman once expressed dismay that poetry offered too much freedom. Tate, under whom Berman studied, said the poems are "narratives that freeze life in impossible contortions", whereas Berman called them "psychedelic soap operas"; Heidi Julavits noted that Berman often distorted familiar concepts in his poetry. Scott Timberg cites "New York, New York" as an example of how "A typical Berman poem starts with an image almost iconic in its ordinariness, delivered in a flat tone".

A second New York is being built
a little west of the old one.
Why another, no one asks,
Just build it, and they do.

— The first stanza of "New York, New York"

Written with direct attention on emotions, Actual Air's poems include small-scale scenes and situations Berman extensively explored, the collection compared to a novel by one critic. The world concocted, analogous to that in his songs, is eccentric—with "plausible contexts" quickly altered by "an odd word" and domestic scenes "tinged with gothic weirdness". Using various styles of prose, Berman depicts, among other occurrences, "police officers [who] slowdance with target range silhouettes" and "blue deer [that] speak Fortran in the restroom".

Berman's poetry has amassed admiration, including from Dara Wier and Billy Collins—Collins featuring him in an anthology. Rich Smith of The Stranger summarized Berman's poetic output as a "master[y of] the opening line, the surprising image, the lyric narrative, the warm abstraction, and the crucial skill of knowing when to use the Latin word or the German word". Aaron Calvin, writing for Pitchfork, wrote that the intersection of Berman's lyrics and poetry bolsters his legacy.

=== Public image and self-perception ===
Here was a man too brilliant for his own health, held captive by unseen forces.

— Marc Hogan of Pitchfork on the opening lyrics to "Random Rules" and general perception of Berman's career

Berman was acutely self-conscious with his public image. After the release of Purple Mountains he feared he would be seen as a depressive, and had earlier wished he could convey a less abrasive persona; on said album, he mused about "the self-created narratives that ha[d] haunted his dark nights of the soul". He kept note of musicians who had mentioned him in interviews and believed his music was unappreciated, having never held his work in esteem, besides his lyrical capability. Berman did not view Silver Jews as a "band that other bands would namedrop", in contrast to the likes of Smog or Will Oldham's bands. Although he once expressed a need for outside validation, he refused to read reviews or articles concerning him. By 2005, hoping to separate his self-perception from others, he had installed an external blocking device on his computer for this very reason.

Although he later just considered himself an artist, Berman had been surprised that his songwriting gained more attention than his poetry, thinking of himself as more a poet than a songwriter. He didn't "fully identify as a songwriter" until the time of Tanglewood Numbers' release, a record which boasted a "deliberate, self-conscious identification with rock tradition", rather than previous outsiderdom. Others perceived him as an earnest poet; Rothband considered Berman "synonymous with what he created". In music and poetry, Berman felt his peers saw him as "moonlighting". He once expressed interest in remaining "a stranger" in both fields.

Berman was seen as a "cult hero" due in part to his aversion to promotion, and his initial refusal to tour generated a sense of mystique. There was scant advertisement for Silver Jews, with Drag City reportedly refused by Berman to promote his music. Berman relied upon word of mouth and positive reviews, although he dismissed the notion of being critically acclaimed—feeling disregarded at large, he resented and ruminated upon some who reviewed his work, vexed by reviewers preoccupied with his struggles, and hoped to sabotage their careers. He expressed ambivalence toward his inability to reach a larger audience. Eric Clark of The Gazette and Berman recognized the band's sound as the source of their relative obscurity; Berman further credited his singing and was motivated by such a status.

Timothy Michalik of Under The Radar said Berman had a simultaneously lowbrow and highbrow persona to which fans could relate; by 2006, Berman, according to Leon Neyfakh, was "increasingly well-known as an eccentric outsider artist". (Note: Elsewhere Berman said, to be an artist, he had to "exist in a time where high and low art mix easily".) He had amassed a reputation as "perhaps the finest lyricist of his generation" with his diligence being a frequent point of discussion. By the time of Purple Mountains' release, Raymond Cummings of The Wire wrote that he had "evolve[d] from deadpan riddler to metaphorical savant to inferent sage to bard laid bare."

Berman's return to music prompted a jovial and personal response from major publications, with concern for Berman having been identified as instrumental to his fervent fanbase. Reception of Purple Mountains was significantly altered following Berman's suicide: critics wrote "it [is] impossible to hear this album in any other context", and "[n]ow, instead of worrying, you mourn".

== Posthumous tributes ==
Many artists paid tribute to Berman following his suicide. Malkmus and Nastanovich both commented on his death and performed shows in his honor. Drag City released a tribute cover of "The Wild Kindness" sung by Callahan, Oldham, and Cassie. Two months after his death, two cover albums were released.

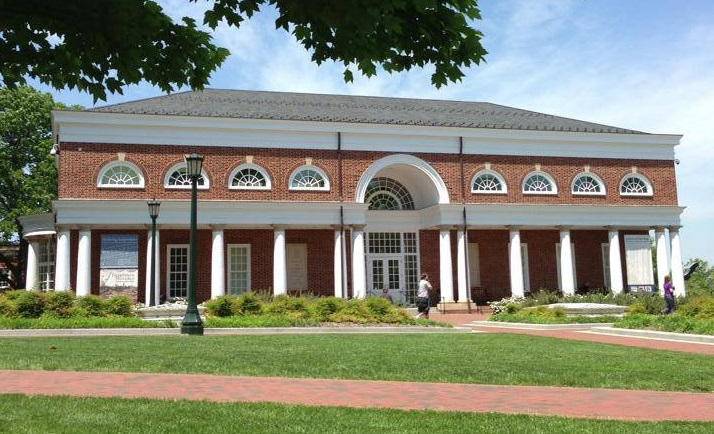
The Albert and Shirley Small Special Collections Library announced it would be collecting materials related to Berman.

A number of musicians referenced and/or paid tribute to Berman in albums: The Avalanches and Cassandra Jenkins quoted Berman. Fleet Foxes and Mogwai memorialized Berman on their respective songs "Sunblind" and "Ritchie Sacramento". Callahan described his and Oldham's collaborative album Blind Date Party as "all of Drag City coming together for David". The Mountain Goats dedicated their song "Arguing With the Ghost of Peter Laughner About His Coney Island Baby Review" to Berman. Daniel Blumberg and John Vanderslice dedicated their respective works On&On and I can't believe civilization is still going here in 2021! Congratulations to all of us, Love DCB to Berman. First Aid Kit released a new song, "Strange Beauty" along with their cover of the Silver Jews' "Random Rules".

The Tennessee Titans, Berman's favorite football team, displayed the message "Nashville (and the world) will always love David Berman" on its Jumbotron during a home game on November 10, 2019. Major publications: The Atlantic, The New Yorker, The New York Times, Pitchfork, Rolling Stone, Slate, Spin and The Washington Post wrote obituaries and tributes. Fans shared lyrics and other tributes on social media; according to Pitchfork's Sam Sodomsky: "In the wake of Berman's death ... His voice never felt louder or more vital". The 62nd Annual Grammy Awards omitted Berman from its in memoriam segment, drawing criticism from some viewers.

After his son's death, Richard Berman released the following statement: "Despite his difficulties, he always remained my special son. I will miss him more than he was able to realize."

== Discography ==
- With Silver Jews:
  - Starlite Walker (1994)
  - The Natural Bridge (1996)
  - American Water (1998)
  - Bright Flight (2001)
  - Tanglewood Numbers (2005)
  - Lookout Mountain, Lookout Sea (2008)
- With Purple Mountains:
  - Purple Mountains (2019)

=== Other credits ===
Title	Year	Artist	Notes	Ref.
Thank You	1995	Royal Trux	Lyrics on "Granny Grunt" and "(Have You Met) Horror James?"	
Joya	1997	Will Oldham	Lyrics on "Apocalypse, No!" (uncredited)	
Sings Greatest Palace Music	2004	Will Oldham (as Bonnie "Prince" Billy)	Vocal coach on "New Partner"; vocals on "No More Workhorse Blues"	
Singlewide	2009	The Dexateens	Vocals on "Can You Whoop It"	
"A Cowboy Overflow of the Heart"	2012	The Avalanches	Vocals, words	
Wildflower	2016	The Avalanches	Vocals and words on "Saturday Night Inside Out"	
Universalists	2018	Yonatan Gat	Producer	
"Outsider" (Ramones cover)	2022	Will Oldham (as Bonnie "Prince" Billy)	Vocals on the bridge	

== Books ==
- Actual Air (1999)
- The Portable February (2009)
