= Kaya Oakes =

American writer and journalist

Kaya Oakes is an American writer and journalist from the San Francisco Bay Area of California.

== Biography ==
She was born in Oakland and earned an MFA in creative writing at Saint Mary's College of California in Moraga.

Since 1999, Oakes has taught writing at the University of California, Berkeley, where she is currently a Senior Continuing Lecturer. She also is a senior correspondent for Religion Dispatches, a contributing writer for America magazine, and has written for The Guardian, Foreign Policy, and On Being. She writes a Substack, Residuum.

In 2002, she co-founded Kitchen Sink Magazine, which received the Utne Independent Press Award for Best New Magazine in 2003. Oakes edited and wrote for Kitchen Sink until it ended its print run in 2007. She is an editor for the religion website Killing the Buddha.

=== Books ===
Oakes' first book, Telegraph, a collection of poetry published in 2007, received the Transcontinental Poetry Prize from Pavement Saw Press in 2008. Her nonfiction book, Slanted and Enchanted: The Evolution of Indie Culture, was published by Henry Holt in June 2009.

In her memoir, Radical Reinvention: An Unlikely Return to the Catholic Church, published by Counterpoint in June 2012, Oakes, who had been raised Catholic, recounts how, after years of proudly calling herself an atheist and despite her frustration with Catholic conservatism, she returned to the Catholic faith.

Oakes published her fourth book, The Nones Are Alright: A New Generation of Seekers, Believers, and Those In Between, with Orbis Books in 2015. It was a finalist for the 2015 Religion News Association best book award. The book examines the decline in participation in organized religion in America by profiling individuals who either fell away from or embraced religion.

Her fifth book, The Defiant Middle: How Women Claim Life's In-Betweens to Remake the World was published with Broadleaf Books (the adult nonfiction imprint of 1517 Media) in November 2021. The book explores women acting subversively and claiming power in institutions and societies that often marginalize them, using examples from history, fiction, and religious texts.

Oakes' sixth book is Not So Sorry: Abusers, False Apologies, and the Limits of Forgiveness, published with Broadleaf Books in July 2024. The book explores forgiveness as a complex spiritual, psychological, and physical process. In an interview about the book, Oakes critiqued the way forgiveness is deployed in Christian faith communities: "Christians unfortunately use forgiveness as an excuse to sweep things under the rug, and as a result, accountability is ill-defined"; she called for specifics on accountability and turning from forgiveness as the "end of a story" to "the beginning of a bigger conversation about grace, compassion, and individual and systemic change."

=== Honors ===
Oakes has been the recipient of teaching fellowships from the Mellon Faculty Institute and the Bay Area Writing Project, as well as a writing prize from the Academy of American Poets. Oakes has twice been nominated for the Pushcart Prize in nonfiction.
