= Dave Cloud =

American singer-songwriter

- Born: David Bliss Cloud; August 3, 1956; Nashville, Tennessee, U.S.
- Died: February 18, 2015 (aged 58) Nashville, Tennessee, U.S.
- Genres: Garage rock, lo-fi, experimental rock, outsider music
- Occupations: Musician, singer-songwriter, record producer, storyteller, actor
- Instruments: vocals, guitar
- Years active: 1970s–2015
- Labels: Fire Records (UK), Thee Swan
- Website: www.davecloud.com

David Bliss Cloud (August 3, 1956 – February 18, 2015) was an American musician, singer, songwriter, storyteller and occasional actor. Cloud was known foremost for his amusing earthy concert performances and garage rock recordings with his band The Gospel of Power.

== Biography ==
Cloud came of age listening to rock and roll of the 1960s and early 1970s, and learned to play guitar as a teenager. He first performed publicly in local Nashville record stores in the late 1970s.

After overcoming severe stage fright, he started to play solo shows in small Nashville clubs, most notably the dive bar Springwater Supper Club & Lounge. In the late 1970s, Cloud formed The Psychotic Night Auditors, a punk rock band so loud and obnoxious that they "cleared the room" at Springwater, prompting the club owner to ban the group "for life."

During the 1980s, Cloud listened mainly to classical music and directed his energies into "private tape experiments [that involved] overdubbing voices, guitars and other instruments." Eventually Cloud was invited back to Springwater, where he would spend the next several years developing his performance style (including his signature "stage humping" and "phantom kung fu" antics) and a repertoire of original compositions, rock and pop covers, and occasional karaoke. In the process he earned a reputation as Nashville's resident "garage rock lounge lizard extraordinaire."

In 1994 Cloud met James Clauer with whom he formed the band Cruel Oval Brown Stomachs (C.O.B.S.), "a jaw-dropping synthesis of performance art, experimental theater, and pure vaudeville." C.O.B.S. disbanded in 1995.

In 1996 Cloud formed Dave Cloud & The Gospel of Power, an experimental garage rock band that would go on to record several lo-fi albums with Cloud as the lead vocalist and principal songwriter. In 2006 Cloud signed a multi-year recording contract with UK record label Fire Records. He toured Europe with The Gospel of Power in 2006 and 2008.

Cloud also worked as a volunteer book reader for visually impaired persons; beginning in 1984 he recorded thousands of hours of audio books and magazines for the Nashville Talking Library. He appeared in several films, music videos, television programs and advertisements.

== Death ==
Cloud died in Nashville on February 18, 2015, aged 58, following a long illness.

== Musical style ==
The Nashville Scene described Cloud's music as a "perverse cross between Neil Diamond and Tom Waits," that "translates a love of 60s and 70s rock and soul through the lens of punk and experimentation." In its review of Cloud's 2006 album Napoleon of Temperance, The Sunday Times wrote, "Cloud's bellowed vocals, Beefheart-style beat poetry, hefty riffs and freestyle wig-outs achieve a transcendental psychedelic primitivism."

== The Gospel of Power ==
The Gospel of Power is the "loose congregation" of Nashville's veteran underground rock musicians that recorded and/or performed with Dave Cloud from 1996 to 2015. The original members in 1996 were Cloud (guitar, vocals), Matt Bach (bass) and Chris Davis (drums). Over the years the roster fluctuated and included Brian Boling, Paul Booker, Matt Button (Lone Official), Tony Crow (Lambchop, Silver Jews), Dave Friedman, Ben Martin (Lone Official, Clem Snide), Laurel Parton (Trauma Team), Steve Poulton, and Matt Swanson (Clockhammer, My Dad Is Dead, Lambchop).

Bassist Matt Swanson recorded and produced (or co-produced) Dave Cloud & The Gospel of Power's first four albums using four-track equipment, and released the first two CDs on his own Thee Swan Recording Company label. Fire Records published the band's subsequent albums. The band performed regularly in the Nashville area and toured Europe twice. The usual touring band members were: Dave Cloud (vocals, guitar), Matt Bach (guitar), Matt Swanson (bass) and Ben Martin (drums), with Paul Booker (guitar) joining the band for local shows.

== Discography ==
=== Albums ===
- Songs I Will Always Sing (1999, Thee Swan Recording Company/Bloodsucker Records)
- All My Best (2004, Thee Swan Recording Company)
- Napoleon of Temperance [2-CD compilation] (2006, Fire Records)
- Pleasure Before Business (2008, Fire Records)
- Practice in the Milky Way (2011, Fire Records)
- Live at Gonerfest (2012, Fire Records)
- Today is the Day That They Take Me Away (2015, Fire Records)

(all with The Gospel of Power)

=== Singles and EPs (all with The Gospel of Power) ===
- "You Don't Need Sex" (2007, Fire Records)
- "Puff Rider" (Various Production remix) (2008, Fire Records)
- "Fever" EP (2009, Fire Records)

=== Other recordings (all with The Gospel of Power except "All the Same") ===
- "Carol of the Bells" on A Working Stiff Christmas: 15 Years at Springwater (2000, Tiny Rig Records)
- "All the Same" on Keep Mother, Vol. 2: C & D (2006, Fire Records)
- "Lovely Rita" on Sgt. Pepper with a Little Help from His Friends (2007, MOJO Magazine)
- "Take You Slow" on This is Ming Beat: A Tribute to Sexton Ming (2009, RIM Records)

== European tours ==
Cloud & The Gospel of Power twice toured the UK and Norway. Their first tour, in the spring of 2006, included shows at London's Scala (supporting the Silver Jews) and Norway's Bergenfest, where Cloud also served as artist in residence. While in London the band performed live on deXter Bentley's "Hello Goodbye" radio show, broadcast on Resonance 104.4 FM. On their second European tour (spring 2008), they were the headline act for Bergenfest's "Indie Bonanza" finale. The band's concert at London's 12 Bar Club was rated "Critics' Choice" in Time Out.

== Notable collaborations ==
Nina Persson of the Cardigans contributed vocals to "Land of a Thousand Dances" on Dave Cloud & The Gospel of Power's fourth album Pleasure Before Business (2008). In March 2008, after his own performance at Springwater in Nashville, Steve Mackay (saxophonist for The Stooges) joined Dave Cloud & The Gospel of Power for two songs during their late-night, garage rock set.

In early 2008, Norwegian folk group Storm Weather Shanty Choir invited Dave Cloud to record a vocal track for the traditional sea shanty "Drunken Sailor". The group originally released the song in June 2008 as a "B-side" single and later included it on its 2009 album Way Hey (And Away We'll Go).

== Film and television appearances ==
Dave Cloud appeared in two Harmony Korine films: Gummo (1997, uncredited) and Trash Humpers (2009); the premiere episode of the TV comedy show Travel Sick (2001); and the 2005 music video for Bobby Bare's song "Are You Sincere." In spring 2008 Cloud was featured in a TV, billboard and print ad campaign for Budweiser beer in the UK.

== Recognition and awards ==
In 2004, Dave Cloud & The Gospel of Power were nominated for a Nashville Scene Music Award in the Rock/Experimental category.
