= Lookout Mountain, Lookout Sea =

Studio album by Silver Jews
- Released: June 17, 2008
- Recorded: March–October 2007
- Length: 33:53
- Label: Drag City
- Producer: David Berman

Silver Jews chronology
Tanglewood Numbers (2005)	Lookout Mountain, Lookout Sea (2008)

Professional ratings
Aggregate scores
Source	Rating
Metacritic	76/100
Review scores
Source	Rating
AllMusic	4/5 stars
Blender	2/5 stars
Drowned in Sound	8/10
MusicOMH	5/5 stars
Pitchfork	6.7/10
PopMatters	6/10
The Skinny	4/5 stars
Spin	4/5 stars
Uncut	4/5 stars

Lookout Mountain, Lookout Sea is the sixth and final studio album by American indie rock band Silver Jews, released on June 17, 2008, through Drag City. It was recorded at Marble Valley of Lexington, Virginia, and Lake Fever Productions of Nashville, Tennessee. Silver Jews records are known for featuring different casts of musicians. This album features the touring band of lead singer, David Berman, including his wife Cassie. Berman has said that the album is "really different" compared to previous ones.

== Recording ==
In an interview with Pitchfork, Berman said that while recording he used a new guitar to influence a new mindset. He wrote all of the songs before going into the studio, so that he could make sure each song took "into account its neighbors". The vocals were not recorded until last, as he kept changing the lyrics and wanted to be able to edit them without having to re-record the entire song. Berman went on to say that at the end of recording he wished he had more time to write, as there were still things he would have changed. "What Is Not but Could Be If" was a 'totally different kind of writing' for Berman, and he compared it to bands that sang slogans and epigrammatic writing.

== Music ==
Lookout Mountain, Lookout Sea has been described as one of the Silver Jews' 'lightest' albums.

== Track listing ==
All tracks are written by David Berman, except where noted.

No.	Title	Writer(s)	Length
1.	"What Is Not but Could Be If..."		3:08
2.	"Aloysius, Bluegrass Drummer"		1:54
3.	"Suffering Jukebox"		4:21
4.	"My Pillow Is the Threshold"		3:52
5.	"Strange Victory, Strange Defeat"		2:44
6.	"Open Field"	Maher Shalal Hash Baz	2:39
7.	"San Francisco, B.C."		6:15
8.	"Candy Jail"		2:30
9.	"Party Barge"		2:55
10.	"We Could Be Looking for the Same Thing"		3:35
Total length:			33:53
