= American Water (album) =

Studio album by Silver Jews
- Released: October 20, 1998
- Studio: Rare Book Room, Brooklyn
- Genre: Indie rock; country rock
- Length: 47:53
- Label: Drag City
- Producer: Nicolas Vernhes; Silver Jews

Silver Jews chronology
The Natural Bridge (1996)	American Water (1998)	Bright Flight (2001)

Singles from American Water
- 1. "Blue Arrangements / Buckingham Rabbit" Released: 1998; 2. "Send in the Clouds" Released: 1998

Professional ratings
Review scores
Source	Rating
AllMusic	4.5/5 stars
The Austin Chronicle	4/5 stars
The Guardian	3/5 stars
The List	4/5 stars
Mojo	4/5 stars
NME	7/10
Pitchfork	9.9/10 (1998); 9.4/10 (2017)
Rolling Stone	3.5/5 stars
The Rolling Stone Album Guide	5/5 stars
Spin	4/5 stars

American Water is the third studio album by American indie rock band Silver Jews. Released in 1998 as an LP and CD on Drag City (DC149) in America and Domino (WIG56) in Europe, American Water was recorded at The Rare Book Room in Brooklyn and mastered at Abbey Road Studios. The album features musicians Tim Barnes, David Berman, Mike Fellows, Stephen Malkmus, Chris Stroffolino, and artwork by Chris Kysor.

== Background ==
Berman was struggling with drug addiction during the recording of American Water. Lyrically, this is expressed in a sense of solidarity with the downtrodden. He described the album's sessions saying: "I was taking a lot of drugs at that time. And there were a lot of drugs in the studio. And all these things that would have horrified indie rock people, that I would never want them to know. I wanted to make a record that wasn't some terrible, big, painful experience. I wanted to make records like other people make records, where you're having fun when you're doing it."

American Water is a continuation from their previous album The Natural Bridge, taking on the themes, accepting them and then questioning them altogether. Berman explained this by saying "The Natural Bridge is me finding out that random rules and I can't handle it... And then in American Water I'm trying to re-say it again, to someone else, after having accepted it. And now I question later on whether things were random at all."

According to a 1998 article in online zine Addicted to Noise, the working title for this album was The Late, Great Silver Jews — a reference to the similarly titled 1972 album by Townes Van Zandt. Among the songs recorded for the album, but omitted from the final product, were "Self-Ignition" (released as a B-side on the "Send in the Clouds" single) and "Police Conversation, 1783", which was never released.

On January 31, 2009, when Silver Jews played their last show ever inside Cumberland Caverns in McMinnville, Tennessee, the final song they performed was the album's second track, "Smith & Jones Forever".

== Music ==
Matthew Strauss of Pitchfork said: "American Water was the sea change in the Silver Jews catalog, a moment when David Berman gave in to melody and made a warm and inviting record. [...] In between the bookends are handfuls of lyrics that are beguiling and stirring, unable to be shaken; it’s often as if Berman is contorting the landscape to his lyrical whims, turning ordinary observations profound or sinister, depending on the song."

== Legacy ==
"The apex of the Silver Jews discography, American Water breathes through the contrast of Berman’s bare profundity and his unruly poetics, brightened by Stephen Malkmus’ playful and virtuosic guitar playing. Life exists in the crevices we can’t explain."

== Critical reception ==
=== Accolades ===
Publication	Accolade	Rank	Ref.
Pitchfork	The 50 Best Albums of 1998	12	
Pitchfork	The Top 200 Tracks of the 1990s ("Random Rules")	103	
Pitchfork	The 150 Best Albums of the 1990s	21	

== Track listing ==
All tracks are written by David Berman, except where noted.

No.	Title	Writer(s)	Length
1.	"Random Rules"		4:00
2.	"Smith & Jones Forever"		3:20
3.	"Night Society"		2:19
4.	"Federal Dust"	David Berman; Stephen Malkmus	4:03
5.	"People"		4:45
6.	"Blue Arrangements"	Berman; Malkmus	4:40
7.	"We Are Real"		4:24
8.	"Send in the Clouds"		5:26
9.	"Like Like the the the Death"		4:00
10.	"Buckingham Rabbit"		4:58
11.	"Honk If You're Lonely"	Berman; Gate Pratt	2:49
12.	"The Wild Kindness"		3:54
Total length:			47:53

== Personnel ==
The American Water Band

- David Berman - lead vocals, guitar
- Stephen Malkmus - guitar, backing vocals, co-lead vocals on "Federal Dust" and "Blue Arrangements"
- Mike Fellows - bass
- Tim Barnes - drums, percussion
- Chris Stroffolino - trumpet on "Random Rules", keyboards on "Random Rules", "We Are Real", "Like like the the the Death", and "The Wild Kindness", piano on "Send in the Clouds" and "Buckingham Rabbit"

Additional personnel

- Chris Kysor - cover art
- Nicolas Vernhes - production
