= Steve West (musician) =

American rock musician (born 1966)

- Born: December 8, 1966 (age 59); Charlottesville, Virginia, United States
- Origin: Rockbridge County, Virginia
- Genres: Alternative rock; indie rock
- Instrument: Drums
- Years active: 1993–present
- Labels: Matador; Echostatic
- Member of: Pavement; Marble Valley
- Formerly of: Silver Jews

Stephen West (born December 8, 1966) is an American musician. From 1993 to 1999 he was the drummer for the indie rock band Pavement appearing on four of their studio albums. He has also become active as an artist in Rockbridge County, Virginia.

== Early life ==
A native of Richmond, Virginia, West went to high school with future Pavement bandmate Bob Nastanovich; the two first met when West was fourteen years old. He then attended Virginia Commonwealth University, where he majored in art, before moving to New York City and working as a security guard at the Whitney Museum. One of his coworkers at the Whitney was Stephen Malkmus, another of his future bandmates in Pavement.

== Career ==
=== Pavement: 1993–1999; 2010; 2019–2023 ===
West was recruited to join Pavement in 1993, after the band dismissed their original drummer, Gary Young. West's first performance with the band was on their 1994 album Crooked Rain, Crooked Rain; he remained in the band until they broke up in 1999. While in Pavement, West was frequently criticized and disparaged by Malkmus for not being technically proficient enough. West has been described as an "infinitely more competent" drummer than Young, although Young himself disagreed. He is the subject of "Westie Can Drum", a B-side released on the Pavement single "Stereo".

He has appeared on their 2010 reunion tour as well as their 2022-2023 tour.

=== Marble Valley: 1997–present ===
While a member of Pavement, West started a solo project, Marble Valley, of which he is the frontman. Marble Valley released its debut album in 1997. In 2010, Marc Hawthorne of SF Weekly described Marble Valley as "...a strange bird, playing around with pop, postpunk, psychedelics, rap, and whatever else it can get its hands on in service of songs that can go from weird to weirder."

=== Silver Jews: 1994 ===
He performed drums and backing vocals on the Silver Jews album Starlite Walker.

== Personal life ==
As of 2003, West lived in rural Virginia with his wife and children.
