= New Radiant Storm King =

American indie rock band

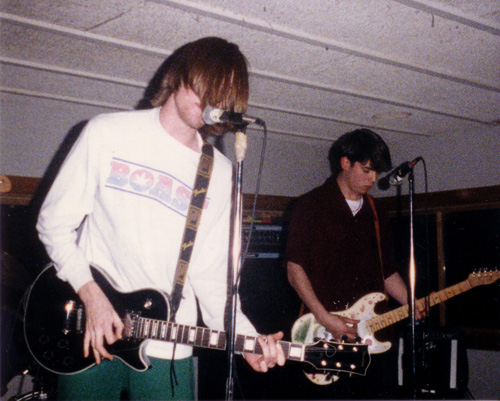
- New Radiant Storm King in 1990.

Background information
- Origin: Amherst, Massachusetts, United States
- Genres: Indie rock; noise rock
- Years active: 1990–2010
- Labels: Darla; Contraphonic; Rainbow Quartz; Grass; Positive; Axis
- Past members: Peyton Pinkerton; Matt Hunter; Caleb Wetmore; Eli Miller; Elizabeth Sharp; Jeremy Smith; Garrett Fontes; Patrick Berkery

New Radiant Storm King was an American indie rock band formed in Amherst, Massachusetts in 1990. The group released nine studio albums over its 20-year existence.

== Biography ==
New Radiant Storm King formed at Hampshire College in 1990, taking its name from a radiator label. Its original lineup was Peyton Pinkerton (vocals, bass), Matt Hunter (vocals, guitar), Eli Miller (guitar), and Elizabeth Sharp (drums). The band made itself known in the college rock movement, of which Western Massachusetts was a hub, and opened for Nirvana during the band's stop at Hampshire for its 1990 Bleach tour. In 1992, Storm King recorded a full-length album, One Day Rust, on the American division of Rough Trade, but the division folded before the record could be released. Miller left the band and the remaining members recorded another album, My Little Bastard Soul, which was picked up by Axis Records and released in 1993 as Storm King's official debut.

After Axis folded, Storm King signed to Grass Records and put out a second album, Rival Time, in 1993. "The Opposing Engineer (Sleeps Alone)," one of the tracks off that record, inspired Guided By Voices' "I Am a Scientist." In 1995, the two bands recorded covers of each other's songs and released them on a split single. Sharp left Storm King after its third album, August Revital, came out in 1994, and was replaced by Jeremy Smith. Together the new lineup released 1996's Hurricane Necklace, which is perhaps the band's most popular album.

Storm King toured England and Scotland in 1998. That year, Wormco reissued My Little Bastard Soul along with a bonus disc, The Castle, composed of sketches and instrumentals composed for a production of Howard Barker's "The Castle", directed by Joshua Goldberg at Hampshire College in 1992. Garrett Fontes replaced Smith and the new quartet released Singular, No Article in 1999. That lineup continued for some years and put out 2002's Winter's Kill (which Darla calls the band's "second most popular album") and 2004's Leftover Blues. Between these albums, the members engaged in other projects. Pinkerton toured with the Pernice Brothers and Hunter toured with The Wharton Tiers Ensemble.

By 2006, Storm King's lineup had shifted to include Caleb Wetmore (bass) and Patrick Berkery (drums). That year, Storm King released The Steady Hand, recorded at Slaughterhouse Recording Studio. Blogger Dave Heaton of Erasing Clouds called an "intelligent and dynamic," "fully realized rock album." The album's song "The Winding Staircase" was featured on the soundtrack of the 2006 movie Catch and Release. The music video for the Steady Hand track "Quicksand Under Carpet," directed by Jay Hollinsworth, won the award for best "Music Video: Animation/Rock 'n' Roll" at the 2007 Maverick Movie Awards. J.J. O'Connell replaced Berkery to become the group's final drummer.

The band's last album, Drinking in the Moonlight, was also recorded at Slaughterhouse and released on October 7, 2008 on Darla Records. Storm King played its final show at Iron Horse Music Hall in Northampton, Massachusetts in 2010.

== Legacy ==
Once expected by some to be "'next big thing' in indie rock," Storm King instead maintained a cult following throughout its years. Critic Kevin Hopper wrote in 1996 that Storm King "belong[s] to an elite group of 'alternative' bands that would otherwise shine were it not for the multiplicity of bands of their ilk." Critic Tom Kielty called them "one of the Bay State's best-kept musical secrets" in 2002.

"The Opposing Engineer (Sleeps Alone)" was covered and released by Guided by Voices in 1995. "The Winding Staircase" was featured on the soundtrack of the 2006 movie Catch and Release.

== Band members ==
=== Former members ===
- Peyton Pinkerton – vocals, guitar (1990–2010)
- Matt Hunter – bass, guitar, vocals (1990–2010)
- Elizabeth Sharp – drums, vocals (1990–1994)
- Caleb Wetmore – bass guitar, backing vocals (2004–2010)
- Eli Miller – vocals, guitar (1990–1991)
- Garrett Fontes – drums (2002–2004)
- Jeremy Smith – drums (2002–2006)

== Related projects ==
Hunter and Pinkerton were the guitarists on the 1996 Silver Jews album The Natural Bridge. Hunter played bass for J Mascis on his world tour in 2003.Hunter now plays in the Whimbrels alongside Arad Evans (Glenn Branca Ensemble) and Norman Westberg (Swans)

Sharp went on to form the band Ill Ease in 1998, which released several studio albums, toured around the world, and opened for acts like Deerhoof and Battles. Pinkerton and Hunter have both released solo albums, most recently Pinkerton's Rapid Cycler in 2016 and Hunter's New Rotations in 2017, both on Darla.

== Discography ==
=== Studio albums ===
- My Little Bastard Soul (1993, Axis)
- Rival Time (1993, Positive)
- August Revital (1994, Grass)
- Hurricane Necklace (1996, Grass)
- Singular, No Article (1999, Rainbow Quartz)
- Winter's Kill (2002, Rainbow Quartz)
- Leftover Blues 1991–2003 (B-sides Compilation) (2004, Contraphonic)
- The Steady Hand (2006, Darla)
- Drinking in the Moonlight (2008, Darla)
