= Ectoslavia =

American indie rock band

- Origin: Charlottesville, Virginia, United States
- Genres: Indie rock; lo-fi; experimental rock; noise rock; art punk
- Years active: 1985–1989
- Spinoffs: Pavement; Silver Jews; Yo La Tengo
- Past members: Stephen Malkmus; David Berman; Bob Nastanovich; James McNew; Gate Pratt; Kylie Wright; Robert Chamberlin; Ken Ganfield; Rich Walker; Jim Ryan; Jeff Honker

Ectoslavia was an American indie rock band formed at the University of Virginia during the mid-1980s. It was composed of pre-Silver Jews, Yo La Tengo, and Pavement members David Berman, James McNew, Stephen Malkmus and Bob Nastanovich. UVA alumnus Gate Pratt was also a member of the band. The music of Ectoslavia used a great deal of noise and static underneath melodic pop-rock songs, not unlike early Pavement EPs like Perfect Sound Forever and Slay Tracks (1933–1969). Their songs also contained samples of classical music, often directly over sheets of static or noise. In 2015, Nastanovich described Ectoslavia as "unlistenable and, with offensive lyrical passages...it’s discardable."

Ectoslavia was referred to in the Slow Century DVD and also in the book Perfect Sound Forever.

== Discography ==
Compilation appearances

Year	Song	Album	Notes
1987	"Wolf-Ledges" / "Grant St."	Songs From a Challenged Landscape	Self-released cassette compilation accompanied the Shelf Life zine of Charlottesville, Virginia.
