= Bob Nastanovich =

American musician (born 1967)

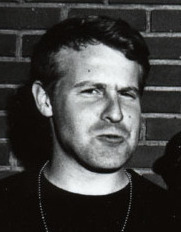
- Bob Nastanovich in 1993

Background information
- Born: Robert Nastanovich; August 27, 1967 (age 59); Rochester, New York, U.S.
- Origin: Midlothian, Virginia, U.S.
- Genre: Indie rock
- Occupation: Musician
- Instruments: Vocals; percussion; synthesizers; harmonica; slide whistle; drums
- Years active: 1990–present
- Member of: Pavement
- Formerly of: Ectoslavia; Silver Jews; Pale Horse Riders; Misshapen Lodge

Robert Nastanovich (born August 27, 1967) is an American musician and member of the indie rock band Pavement, as well as a former member of Silver Jews, Ectoslavia, Pale Horse Riders, and Misshapen Lodge.

== Early life and education ==
Bob Nastanovich was born in Rochester, New York. When he was in elementary school, his family moved to the town of Midlothian, Virginia. He graduated from University of Virginia in 1989 with a B. A. in American Government.

== Career ==
At the University of Virginia, he met Pavement's Stephen Malkmus and future Silver Jews leader David Berman. The three moved to Jersey City, New Jersey, living and working together at various jobs in art galleries (as security guards) and Nastanovich as a bus driver/bus terminal manager in New York City and Hoboken. It was during this period that Malkmus reunited with longtime friend Scott Kannberg to create the first (then unofficial) Pavement album Slanted and Enchanted in drummer Gary Young's makeshift home studio. It is also during this time that the seeds for the future Silver Jews (Nastanovich, Malkmus and Berman) were planted.

Nastanovich, upon his introduction to the band in 1990, performed many functions – namely backing vocals, percussion, harmonica, and synthesizers. Initially, his key role was that of assistant time keeper, effectively focusing the efforts of the distracted and eccentric Young. Nastanovich remained a member of the band after Young left, although Steve West became the new drummer.

Nastanovich sang lead vocals on live performances of the songs "Debris Slide," "Conduit for Sale," and "Unfair." He's known for his stage presence and his trademark scream.

Nastanovich also played on several Silver Jews records. He has tour managed Stephen Malkmus and the Jicks, the Frogs, Huggy Bear, Fila Brazillia (road crew) and Silver Jews. In addition, he has played on recordings by Palace Brothers, Tall Dwarfs and Pale Horse Riders. Nastanovich is also a sometime member of the improvising post-rock-ish band Misshapen Lodge, formed in Hull on one of his visits to the city.

He rejoined Pavement for their worldwide reunion tours in 2010 and 2022-25.

He co-hosted The 3 Songs Podcast with Mike Hogan and ran Brokers Tip Records.

== Other activities ==
After Pavement's split, he served as jockey agent for Greta Kuntzweiler and Joe Johnson. He also wrote for Daily Racing Form and was a chart caller for Equibase Inc.

== Personal life ==
By visiting Epsom Race Course on August 27, 2012, Nastanovich, celebrating his 45th birthday, became the first known American citizen to attend horse racing fixtures at all 60 British race courses.

As of 2025, Nastanovich works for Thoro-Graph Inc, is a pundit on Horse Racing Radio Network and is a writer for Thorougbred Daily News. He breeds and owns race horses based in England, California and Arkansas. Nastanovich is divorced. Until 2024, Nastanovich owned and operated the record label Brokers Tip Records.

== Discography ==
=== With Pavement ===
==== EPs ====
- Watery, Domestic (1992)
- Pacific Trim (1996)

==== Albums ====
- Crooked Rain, Crooked Rain (1994)
- Wowee Zowee (1995)
- Brighten the Corners (1997)
- Terror Twilight (1999)

=== With Silver Jews ===
==== Singles and EPs ====
- Dime Map of the Reef (1992)
- Arizona Record (1993)

==== Compilation ====
- Early Times (2011)

==== Albums ====
- Starlite Walker (1994)
- Tanglewood Numbers (2005)

=== Miscellaneous ===
- 2018 – Vocals on the song Send In The Drums (Turnstyle)
