= Silver Jews =

American indie rock band

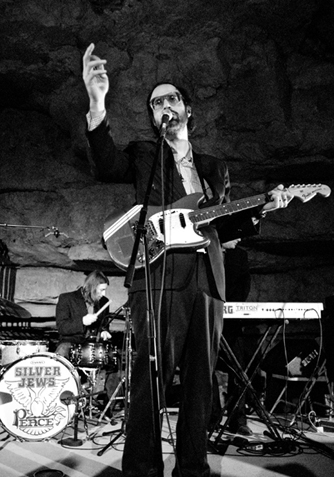
- Silver Jews during their final show

Background information
- Origin: Hoboken, New Jersey, U.S.
- Genres: Indie rock; country rock; noise rock; lo-fi; alt-country; slacker rock
- Years active: 1989–2009
- Label: Drag City
- Spinoffs: Purple Mountains
- Spinoff of: Ectoslavia
- Past members: David Berman; Cassie Berman; Duane Denison; Matt Hunter; Paz Lenchantin; Stephen Malkmus; Rian Murphy; Bob Nastanovich; Paul Niehaus; Will Oldham; Peyton Pinkerton; Chris Stroffolino; William Tyler; Steve West; J. D. Wilkes; Azita Youssefi; Brian Kotzur

Silver Jews were an American indie rock band from Hoboken, New Jersey, formed in 1989 by David Berman alongside Pavement members Stephen Malkmus and Bob Nastanovich. Berman was the only constant band member. During the last few albums, Cassie Berman became a regular member of the band. They disbanded in 2009.

== History ==
=== Early years ===
Berman was living in Hoboken, New Jersey with two University of Virginia friends, Stephen Malkmus and Bob Nastanovich, and recording discordant tapes in their living room. Around this time, he worked as a security guard at New York's Whitney Museum of American Art, which influenced their music. Berman said, "We were working at the Whitney with all this conceptual art, and we were learning about it [...] And so I thought, "Well let's just make this record that looks like a record, and has song titles and everything, but the songs would be the ones we make at home that sound terrible." Although the band is often called a Pavement side project, its formation actually preceded Pavement's.

"Walnut Falcons" was tossed around as a potential band name before "Silver Jews" was chosen. Berman, who was Jewish, joked that the name came from a billboard he saw reading "Silver Jewelry" and later revealed that the name was actually intended to be a pseudonym for a conceptual art piece but instead evolved into the actual band. Others claim that the name pays homage to Silver Apples, the Beatles' early name "the Silver Beatles", and a slang term for Jews with blonde hair. In an interview with Vish Khanna in June 2019, Berman said, "Silver Jews was a very burdensome band name. It confused people: I never made it clear what I meant by it. It wasn't until the end until I realized what a proper definition of Silver Jew would be outside of the context of my music, which would be a Jew that was Jewish down through patrilineal descent, which would be a Jew that's not a Jew, really. It's the outsiders to the outsiders."

=== Touring ===
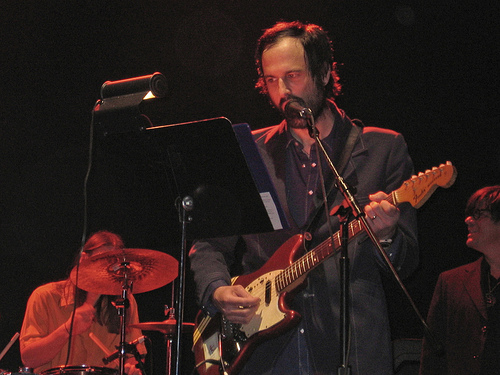
Silver Jews performing at Webster Hall in 2006

Berman had pointedly avoided playing live throughout much of the band's existence but Silver Jews surprised fans by announcing their first-ever tour following the release of Tanglewood Numbers in 2005. They toured North America, Europe, and Israel in 2006. A documentary, titled Silver Jew, was filmed during the band's time in Israel.

=== Break up ===
On January 22, 2009, Berman announced via the official Drag City messageboard that he planned to retire from music and that the Silver Jews would play their final show on Bluegrass Underground at Cumberland Caverns in McMinnville, Tennessee at 3 pm on January 31, 2009. The caverns are located 333 feet underground, and only 300 general admission tickets were made available. Berman stated that he would play his 15 favorite Silver Jews songs. He also wrote that his intentions are to move to "screenwriting or muckraking". He closed the entry by saying, "I always said we would stop before we got bad. If I continue to record I might accidentally write the answer song to 'Shiny Happy People'."

Berman originally planned for the concert to be recorded and aired sometime in February 2009 on Nashville's famed WSM AM radio station; however, the day before the show, Berman posted on the Drag City message board to say that he had "negotiated out of the WSM part out of the deal." The concert was documented by several 16 mm film cameras, and Berman hinted at a possible DVD release of the show at some point in the future.

The last song that the Silver Jews performed live was "Smith and Jones Forever".

=== Post-breakup events ===
On June 19, 2012, Early Times was released by Drag City. Early Times is a compilation of EPs and singles that were released before the debut LP Starlite Walker.

In 2015, Bob Nastanovich posted a photo to his Facebook page featuring the band rehearsing. He said that the band is working on two new songs, "The Veranda Over The Toy Shoppe", and "Wacky Package Eyes". David Berman later said the photo was a prank. Berman instead returned with new project Purple Mountains in July 2019, but died the following month.

== Musical style and artistry ==
The Silver Jews' musical style has been described by AllMusic as "a beautiful mess of indie rock, country-rock and lo-fi with lyrics both witty and profound", while Billboard described them as a "lo-fi mixture of noise rock and country music".

The Silver Jews' album artwork often featured horizons; in the case of Bright Flight it has been surmised to be symbolic of the theme.

== Members and collaborators ==
Final lineup

- David Berman – songwriter, vocals, guitar, piano, percussion (1989–2009; died 2019)
- Cassie Berman – backing vocals, bass guitar (2001–2009)
- Payton Pinkerton – bass guitar (1996), guitar (2006–2009)
- William Tyler – guitar (2001–2009)
- Tony Crow – piano, keyboards (2001–2009)
- Brian Kotzur – drums (2004–2009)

Former members

- Stephen Malkmus – guitar, bass, piano, percussion, backing and co-lead vocals (1989–1995, 1998, 2005)
- Bob Nastanovich – drums, percussion, synthesizer, backing vocals (1989–1995, 2005)
- Steve West – drums, percussion, backing vocals (1994–1995)
- Matt Hunter – guitar (1996)
- Michael Deming – keyboards, engineer, mixing (1996)
- Rian Murphy – drums, producer (1996)
- Mike Fellows – bass guitar (1998–2005)
- Chris Stroffolino – keyboards, piano, trumpet (1998)
- Tim Barnes – drums, percussion (1998–2001)

Guest musicians

- Paul Niehaus – pedal steel guitar (2001)
- Will Oldham – vocals (2005)
- Bobby Bare Jr. – vocals (2005)
- Azita Youssefi – vocals, etc. (2005)
- Duane Denison – guitar, etc. (2005)
- Paz Lenchantin – bass guitar, etc. (2005)
- Pete Cummings (2005)
- John St. West (2005)
- J.D. Wilkes

Timeline

== Discography ==
=== Studio albums ===
- Starlite Walker (1994)
- The Natural Bridge (1996)
- American Water (1998)
- Bright Flight (2001)
- Tanglewood Numbers (2005)
- Lookout Mountain, Lookout Sea (2008)

=== EPs ===
- Dime Map of the Reef (1992)
- The Arizona Record (1993)
- Tennessee (2001)

=== Singles ===
- "Dime Map of the Reef" (1992)
- "Silver Jews and Nico" (1993)
- "Blue Arrangements" (1998)
- "Send in the Clouds" (1998)
- "Self Ignition" (1998)
- "Hot as Hell" (1999)

=== Compilations ===
- Early Times (2012)

== Filmography ==
- Silver Jew (2007)
