= Pavement discography =

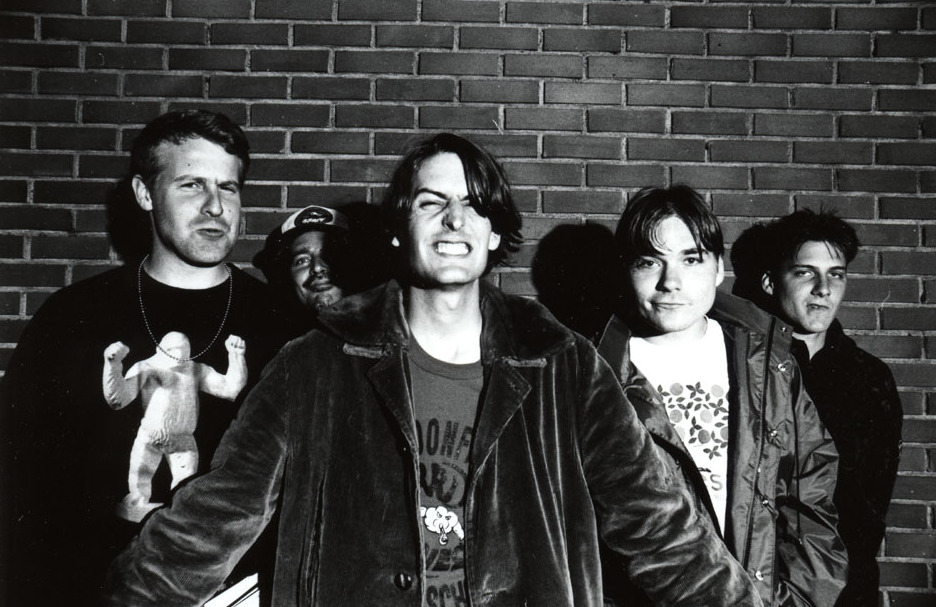
- Pavement in 1993
- Studio albums: 5
- Extended plays: 10
- Live albums: 2
- Compilation albums: 7
- Singles: 13
- Video albums: 1
- Music videos: 14

The discography of Pavement, a Stockton, California-based indie rock group, consists of five studio albums, five double-length reissues of the albums, one compilation, ten extended plays, and thirteen singles. This list does not include material performed by members or former members of Pavement that was recorded with Stephen Malkmus and the Jicks, Silver Jews, Preston School of Industry, Free Kitten, The Crust Brothers, or any other associated solo or side projects.

Pavement was formed in 1989 by Stephen Malkmus (guitars, vocals) and Scott Kannberg (guitars), although Malkmus stated that at this stage they "weren't a real band". Pavement's debut, the 1989 EP Slay Tracks: 1933–1969, was recorded in a day with drummer and producer Gary Young and released on Kannberg's self-owned label Treble Kicker. The band subsequently released the EPs Demolition Plot J-7 and Perfect Sound Forever on Drag City, and in 1992 released their debut album, Slanted and Enchanted, on Matador Records. The band was joined by additional percussionist Bob Nastanovich, who assisted the increasingly erratic Young in keeping time, and later by bassist Mark Ibold. The 1992 EP Watery, Domestic was the band's first recording with their two new members, and the last with Young. Young, known for his bizarre onstage behavior with the band, was replaced by Steve West in 1993. After this, Nastanovich's role in the band expanded to also include his playing keyboards.

Pavement's first three EPs were re-released together for the 1993 compilation Westing (By Musket and Sextant). The band's next studio album release, 1994's Crooked Rain, Crooked Rain, featured the singles "Cut Your Hair" and "Gold Soundz" which nearly broke Pavement into the mainstream. The 18-song follow-up to Crooked Rain, 1995's Wowee Zowee, was more experimental than its predecessor and was initially criticized as evidence that the "defiantly anti-corporate" band was "simply afraid to succeed;" the album did not sell as well as Crooked Rain. The band's 1997 album Brighten the Corners "brought [the band] back" according to West, although shortly after the 1999 release of Terror Twilight Malkmus broke the band up. Since then, Pavement's former members have worked on various side projects, and the band's five studio albums have been reissued featuring previously unreleased songs, b-sides, compilation tracks, and live performances.

== Albums ==
=== Studio albums ===
Year	Details	Peak chart positions										Sales	Certifications
Year	Details	US	AUS	CAN	FRA	GER	NLD	NOR	NZL	SWE	UK	Sales	Certifications
1992	Slanted and Enchanted: Released: April 20, 1992; Label: Matador; Formats: LP, CD, cassette	—	178	—	—	—	—	—	—	—	72	212,000	
1994	Crooked Rain, Crooked Rain: Released: February 14, 1994; Label: Matador; Formats: LP, CD, CS	121	86	—	—	77	—	—	41	—	15	335,000	BPI: Silver
1995	Wowee Zowee: Released: April 11, 1995; Label: Matador; Formats: LP, CD, CS	117	119	65	39	60	75	—	25	—	18	180,000	
1997	Brighten the Corners: Released: February 11, 1997; Label: Matador; Formats: LP, CD, CS	70	64	64	—	—	—	38	50	56	27	200,000	BPI: Silver
1999	Terror Twilight: Released: June 8, 1999; Label: Matador; Formats: LP, CD, CS	95	63	—	—	63	—	20	24	—	19	140,000	
"—" denotes albums that did not chart.

=== Compilations and reissues ===
Year	Details	Peak chart positions				Sales
Year	Details	US	US Indie	AUS	UK	Sales
1993	Westing (By Musket and Sextant): Released: March 30, 1992 (UK); 1993 (US); Label: Big Cat; Drag City; King; Formats: LP, CD, CS	—	—	171	30	63,000
2002	Slanted and Enchanted: Luxe & Reduxe: Released: October 22, 2002; Label: Matador; Formats: CD	152	5	—	—	
2004	Crooked Rain, Crooked Rain: LA's Desert Origins: Released: October 26, 2004; Label: Matador; Formats: CD	164	14	—	—	
2006	Wowee Zowee: Sordid Sentinels Edition: Released: November 16, 2006; Label: Matador; Domino; Formats: CD	185	13	—	—	11,595
2008	Brighten the Corners: Nicene Creedence Edition: Released: December 9, 2008 (CD) / June 23, 2009 (12"); Label: Matador; Formats: LP, CD	—	—	—	—	
2010	Quarantine the Past: The Best of Pavement: Released: March 8, 2010; Label: Matador; Formats: CD	170	23	135	—	
2010	Gold Soundz: The In(compleat) Pavement: Released: March 24, 2010; Label: Hostess Entertainment Unlimited, Matador; Formats: 5×CD, 2×DVD	—	—	—	—	
2015	The Secret History, Vol. 1: Released: August 28, 2015; Label: Matador; Formats: LP	—	—	—	—	
2022	Terror Twilight: Farewell Horizontal: Released: April 8, 2022; Label: Matador; Formats: LP, CD	—	—	—	—	
2024	Cautionary Tales: Jukebox Classiques: Released: August 2, 2024; Label: Matador; Formats: 19×LP	—	—	—	—	
2025	Hecklers Choice: Big Gums and Heavy Lifters: Released: September 18, 2025; Label: Matador; Formats: LP, CD	—	—	—	—	
"—" denotes albums that were released but did not chart. Blank entries denote unavailable sales figures.

=== Live albums ===
Year	Details
2008	Live Europaturnén MCMXCVII: Released: December 9, 2008; Label: Matador (OLE 324); Formats: LP
2009	Live Europaturnén MCMXCVII (2): Released: April 18, 2009; Label: Matador (5459); Formats: LP

=== Soundtrack albums ===
Year	Details
2025	Pavements (motion picture soundtrack): Released: May 30, 2025; Label: Matador; Formats: LP, CD

== EPs ==
Year	Details	Peak chart positions		
Year	Details	US Alt.	IRL	UK
1989	Slay Tracks: 1933–1969: Released: 1989; Label: Treble Kicker; Formats: 7"	—	—	—
1990	Demolition Plot J-7: Released: June 1, 1990; Label: Drag City; Formats: 7"	—	—	—
1991	Perfect Sound Forever: Released: April 15, 1991; Label: Drag City; Formats: 10"	—	—	—
1992	Watery, Domestic: Released: November 25, 1992; Label: Matador; Big Cat; Formats: 12", CD	—	25	58
1996	Pacific Trim: Released: January 23, 1996; Label: Matador; Big Cat; Formats: 7", CD	—	—	91
"—" denotes EPs that were released but did not chart or were not released in the country listed.

== Singles ==
Year	Title	Peak chart positions			Album
Year	Title	US Alt	AUS	UK	Album
1991	"Summer Babe"	—	—	—	Slanted and Enchanted
1992	"Trigger Cut"	—	—	76	Slanted and Enchanted
1994	"Cut Your Hair"	10	188	52	Crooked Rain, Crooked Rain
1994	"Gold Soundz"	—	—	94	Crooked Rain, Crooked Rain
1995	"Range Life"	—	—	79	Crooked Rain, Crooked Rain
1995	"Rattled by the Rush"	—	—	91	Wowee Zowee
1995	"Father to a Sister of Thought"	—	173	148	Wowee Zowee
1997	"Stereo"	—	—	48	Brighten the Corners
1997	"Shady Lane"	—	—	40	Brighten the Corners
1999	"Spit on a Stranger"	—	—	—	Terror Twilight
1999	"Carrot Rope"	—	—	27	Terror Twilight
1999	"Major Leagues"	—	—	—	Terror Twilight
"—" denotes singles that were released but did not chart or were not released in the country listed.

=== Other certified songs ===
Year	Title	Certifications	Album
1999	"Harness Your Hopes"	RIAA: Platinum; BPI: Silver; RMNZ: Gold	Spit on a Stranger

== Music videos ==
Year	Title	Director
1991	"Summer Babe"	Tanya Small
1992	"Perfume-V" (live)	Kim Gordon
1992	"Here"	Thurston Moore
1994	"Cut Your Hair"	Dan Koretzky and Rian Murphy
1994	"Gold Soundz"	S.D. Blen
1994	"Range Life"	S.D. Blen
1995	"Father to a Sister of Thought"	John Kelsey
1995	"Rattled by the Rush"	John Kelsey
1996	"Painted Soldiers"	Dan Koretzky and Rian Murphy
1997	"Stereo"	John Kelsey
1997	"Shady Lane"	Spike Jonze
1999	"Carrot Rope"	Lance Bangs
1999	"Spit on a Stranger"	Lance Bangs
1999	"Major Leagues"	Lance Bangs
2022	"Harness Your Hopes"	Alex Ross Perry

== Video ==
Year	Video information
2002	Slow Century: Released: October 31, 2002; Label: Matador (OLE 388); Director: Lance Bangs

== Miscellaneous ==
Year	Song	Album	Comments
1990	"My Radio"	Chemical Imbalance Vol.2 #3	Appears on Westing (By Musket and Sextant).
1991	"David's Gone"	Nostalgic Glimpse of Victorian Country Childhood	
1991	"My First Mine"	Us / My First Mine	Appears on Westing (By Musket and Sextant)
1992	"Greenlander"	Volume 4	Appears on Slanted and Enchanted: Luxe & Reduxe and Born to Choose.
1993	"Unseen Power of the Picket Fence"	No Alternative	Appears on "Shady Lane 7"" and Crooked Rain, Crooked Rain: LA's Desert Origins.
1994	"Untitled"	Cut Your Hair 12" vinyl	
1994	"Haunt You Down", "Jam Kids"	Crooked Rain, Crooked Rain vinyl bonus 7"	"Haunt You Down" and "Jam Kids" appear on Crooked Rain, Crooked Rain: LA's Desert Origins.
1994	"Nail Clinic"	Hey Drag City!	Appears on Crooked Rain, Crooked Rain: L.A.'s Desert Origins.
1995	"Dancing with the Elders"	Dancing With the Elders / Chemical	Appears on Wowee Zowee: Sordid Sentinels Edition.
1995	"It's a Hectic World"	Homage: Lots of Bands Doing Descendents' Songs	Cover of a 1979 Descendents song. Appears on Wowee Zowee: Sordid Sentinels Edition.
1996	"Sensitive Euro Man"	I Shot Andy Warhol	Appears on Wowee Zowee: Sordid Sentinels Edition.
1996	"Painted Soldiers"	Kids in the Hall: Brain Candy	Appears on Wowee Zowee: Sordid Sentinels Edition.
1996	"No More Kings"	Schoolhouse Rock! Rocks	Cover of a song from Schoolhouse Rock!. Appears on Wowee Zowee: Sordid Sentinels Edition.
1996	"Fountain Scissors"	Sidereal Rest "The Sleep Vehicle"	
1997	"Type Slowly"	Tibetan Freedom Concert	Appears on Brighten the Corners: Nicene Creedence Edition.
1999	"Robyn Turns 26"	At Home with the Groovebox	
1999	"Cut Your Hair", "Rattled By the Rush"	One Man & His Bog	Live performances from 27/10/99 at the Adelphi Club in Hull UK. Issued as part of a 20th anniversary book / 2CD compilation celebrating the club.
1999	"Stereo", "Grounded" (Crooked Rain version)	Everything Is Nice: Matador Records 10th Anniversary Anthology	"Stereo" appears on Brighten the Corners and "Grounded" (Crooked Rain version) appears on Crooked Rain, Crooked Rain: LA's Desert Origins.
2000	"Watch Out!"	At Home With the Groovebox vinyl-only bonus track	
2006	"Black Out" (alternate version), "Extradition" (alternate vocal)	Wow Out! bonus 7"	Distributed with pre-orders of Wowee Zowee: Sordid Sentinels Edition
2006	"Box Elder", "Range Life", "Brinx Job", "Brink Of The Clouds", "Unfair", "Easily Fooled", "Best Friend's Arm", "She Believes", "Silent Kid", "Black Out", "Summer Babe", "Elevate Me Later", "Heckler Spray / In The Mouth A Desert", "Fight This Generation", "Debris Slide", "Two States", and "Stop Breathing"	Live At The Palace, Hollywood CA, April 24 1994	Distributed with pre-orders of Wowee Zowee: Sordid Sentinels Edition as an MP3 download
2009	"...And Then" (7" version), "Agony Of The Stars," "Westie Can Drum (Elastica)," "Birds In The Majic Industry" (instrumental), "Stereo" (Steve Fisk remix), "Painted Soldiers" (live on KCRW), "What Goes On" (Velvet Underground cover, live on KCRW), "Kris Kraft" (live on KCRW)	Brighten The Corners: Nicene Creedence Edition vinyl bonus tracks	"Westie Can Drum (Elastica)" was released digitally as a bonus download with pre-orders of Brighten The Corners: Nicene Creedence Edition in 2008. "Stereo" (Steve Fisk remix) and "Birds In The Majic Industry" (instrumental) appeared on the "Stereo" promo CD in 1997 as well as the "Shady Lane" Japanese EP in 1998. "...And Then" appeared on the B-side of the "Spit on a Stranger" 7" in 1999.
2020	"Sensitive Euro Man", "Brink of the Clouds/Candylad"	Sensitive Euro Man / Brink of the Clouds/Candylad	Appears on Wowee Zowee: Sordid Sentinels Edition.
2022	"Ann Don't Cry (Echo Canyon)"	Terror Twilight: Farewell Horizontal vinyl bonus track	Appears on Terror Twilight: Farewell Horizontal digital and vinyl versions only.
