= Quarantine the Past: The Best of Pavement =

Greatest hits album by Pavement
- Released: March 8, 2010
- Recorded: 1989–1999
- Genre: Indie rock
- Length: 73:18
- Labels: Matador, Domino
- Producer: Various

Pavement chronology
Live Europaturnén MCMXCVII (2) (2008)	Quarantine the Past: The Best of Pavement (2010)	Terror Twilight: Farewell Horizontal (2022)

Professional ratings
Aggregate scores
Source	Rating
Metacritic	85/100
Review scores
Source	Rating
AllMusic	4.5/5 stars
Consequence of Sound	4/5 stars
Drowned in Sound	9/10
Mojo	4/5 stars
MusicOMH	4/5 stars
NME	4.5/5 stars
Pitchfork	10/10
Q	4/5 stars
Sputnikmusic	4.5/5
Uncut	4/5 stars

Quarantine the Past: The Best of Pavement is a compilation album released by Pavement on March 8, 2010, to coincide with the band's reunion. The title of the compilation references a lyric from the 1994 song "Gold Soundz", which is the first song featured on the compilation.

== Background ==
On January 5, 2010, Matador Records announced that a greatest hits compilation titled Quarantine The Past: The Best Of Pavement would be released on March 9 on CD and double LP. The compilation would contain 23 tracks from Pavement's entire career, including “the scratchy and mysterious sounds of their early vinyl-only releases to the rich, multi-layered warmth of their final recordings.” The blog posting noted that “although the compilation does not include any unreleased material, it definitely digs deeper than the hits.” The blog posting revealed the artwork of the compilation, and announced a contest to guess the order of the songs on the album (except for the first track, which had been already revealed to be the band's 1994 single "Gold Soundz") in which the first-place winner would get to see a Pavement reunion concert at Central Park Summerstage. In addition, a second-place winner with the “most imaginative track listing” (as chosen by the band) would have their track listing pressed on a limited edition Record Store Day double LP version of Quarantine The Past. On January 25, Matador announced the correct track listing of the album and announced the winner of the competition.

== Track listing ==
1. "Gold Soundz" - 2:40 from Crooked Rain, Crooked Rain (1994)
2. "Frontwards" – 3:01 from Watery, Domestic (1992)
3. "Mellow Jazz Docent" – 1:52 from Perfect Sound Forever (EP) (1991)
4. "Stereo" – 3:07 from Brighten the Corners (1997)
5. "In the Mouth a Desert" – 3:48 from Slanted and Enchanted (1992)
6. "Two States" – 1:48 from Slanted and Enchanted (1992)
7. "Cut Your Hair" – 3:05 from Crooked Rain, Crooked Rain (1994)
8. "Shady Lane / J Vs. S" – 3:51 from Brighten the Corners (1997)
9. "Here" – 3:55 from Slanted and Enchanted (1992)
10. "Unfair" – 2:31 from Crooked Rain, Crooked Rain (1994)
11. "Grounded" – 4:15 from Wowee Zowee (1995)
12. "Summer Babe (Winter Version)" – 3:15 from Slanted and Enchanted (1992)
13. "Range Life" – 4:56 from Crooked Rain, Crooked Rain (1994)
14. "Date w/ IKEA" - 2:38 from Brighten the Corners (1997)
15. "Debris Slide" - 1:56 from Perfect Sound Forever (EP) (1991)
16. "Shoot the Singer (1 Sick Verse)" - 3:15 from Watery, Domestic (1992)
17. "Spit on a Stranger" - 3:01 from Terror Twilight (1999)
18. "Heaven Is a Truck" - 2:29 from Crooked Rain, Crooked Rain (1994)
19. "Trigger Cut/Wounded-Kite At :17" - 3:15 from Slanted and Enchanted (1992)
20. "Embassy Row" - 3:50 from Brighten the Corners (1997)
21. "Box Elder" - 2:24 from Slay Tracks: 1933–1969 (1989) (alternative mix omitting bass guitar)
22. "Unseen Power of the Picket Fence" - 3:50 from No Alternative compilation (1993)
23. "Fight this Generation" - 4:23 from Wowee Zowee (1995)

== Record Store Day Limited Edition ==
On February 2, 2010, Matador Records announced the second-place winner of their competition, in which their “most imaginative” track listing would be made into a special edition Record Store Day double LP release. Limited to 1,000 copies, this edition features special silkscreen cover art designed by the band themselves and was released on April 17 at participating record stores. The track listing is as follows:

1. "Zurich Is Stained" – from Slanted and Enchanted (1992)
2. "Trigger Cut/Wounded-Kite At :17" – from Slanted and Enchanted (1992)
3. "Grave Architecture" – from Wowee Zowee (1995)
4. "Unfair" – from Crooked Rain, Crooked Rain (1994)
5. "…And Carrot Rope" – from Terror Twilight (1999)
6. "Shady Lane / J Vs. S" – from Brighten the Corners (1997)
7. "Two States" – from Slanted and Enchanted (1992)
8. "Fame Throwa" – from Slanted and Enchanted (1992)
9. "Cut Your Hair" – from Crooked Rain, Crooked Rain (1994)
10. "Here" – from Slanted and Enchanted (1992)
11. "Extradition" – from Wowee Zowee (1995)
12. "Stereo" – from Brighten the Corners (1997)
13. "The Hexx" – from Terror Twilight (1999)
14. "Shoot The Singer (1 Sick Verse)" – from Watery, Domestic (1992)
15. "Kennel District" – from Wowee Zowee (1995)
16. "Price Yeah!" – from Slay Tracks: 1933–1969 (1989)
17. "No Life Singed Her" – from Slanted and Enchanted (1992)
18. "Stop Breathin’" – from Crooked Rain, Crooked Rain (1994)
19. "Type Slowly (Live)" – from Tibetan Freedom Concert compilation (1997)
20. "Fin" – from Brighten the Corners (1997)
21. "Forklift" – from Demolition Plot J-7 (1990)
22. "Fight This Generation" – from Wowee Zowee (1995)
23. "Box Elder" – from Slay Tracks: 1933–1969 (1989)

== Personnel ==
- David Winton Bell – Photo Courtesy
- Greg Calbi – Mastering
- Doug Easley – Engineer
- Mitch Easter – Engineer
- Jesper Eklow – Compilation
- Nigel Godrich – Engineer
- Bryce Goggin – Engineer
- Cy Jameson – Engineer
- Davis McCain – Engineer
- Mark Ohe – Art Direction
- Pavement – Compilation, Art Direction
- Mark Venezia – Engineer

== Chart performance ==
Chart	Peak Position
Australian Albums (ARIA)	135
Billboard 200	170
US Independent Albums	23
