= Live Europaturnén MCMXCVII =

Live album by Pavement
- Released: December 9, 2008
- Recorded: 1997
- Genre: Indie rock
- Label: Matador Records (1999-present); Matador Records/Capitol Records (1997-1998)
- Producer: Pavement

Pavement chronology
Brighten the Corners: Nicene Creedence Edition (2008)	Live Europaturnén MCMXCVII (2008)	Live Europaturnén MCMXCVII (2) (2009)

Live Europaturnén MCMXCVII is a live album by Pavement, which was recorded at a concert in Europe in 1997. Only available in 12" vinyl format, the album was included as part of a bonus offer for those who pre-ordered Brighten the Corners: Nicene Creedence Edition - the deluxe re-issue edition of Pavement's 1997 album Brighten the Corners - from certain independent record shops.

The song titles for Live Europaturnén MCMXCVII are listed only on the record labels, and not on the actual album sleeve. Most of them also differ in spelling, or are entirely different from what is listed on the band's studio albums for the same songs.

== Reception ==
The record's belated release has been met with a positive critical response. Monday Field of Frank Booth Review gave the album 90/100, championing not only the strong performances, but also the production and choice of format, stating that "like Pavement’s early work, this was made for vinyl ... its playful warmth radiates through every groove."

== Track listing ==
There are two versions of this release with slightly varying actual track listing, neither of which matches the following listing on the label:

=== Side A ===
(titles as printed on label)

1. "Father To Sister Thought"
2. "Shady Layne"
3. "Silence Kid"
4. "Stereo"
5. "Remake/Remodel"
6. "Blue Hawaii"
7. "Painted Soldiers"

=== Side B ===
(titles as printed on label)

1. "Cut Your Hare"
2. "Stopp Breathing"
3. "Joe Boyd (Stringband)"
4. "Loretta Scars"
5. "Tusk" (Fin)
6. "Range Lifer"

=== Actual Listing (Version 1) ===
1. Father to a Sister of Thought
2. Shady Lane
3. Silence Kit
4. Stereo
5. Type Slowly
6. Blue Hawaiian
7. Painted Soldiers
8. Cut Your Hair
9. Stop Breathing
10. We are Underused
11. Loretta's Scars
12. Fin
13. Range Life

=== Actual Listing (Version 2) ===
1. Shady Lane
2. And Then
3. Date w. IKEA
4. Transport is Arranged
5. Stereo
6. Kennel District
7. Cut Your Hair
8. Fin
9. Blue Hawaiian
10. Grave Architecture
