= Pavements (film) =

2024 film by Alex Ross Perry

- Theatrical release poster
- Directed by: Alex Ross Perry
- Written by: Alex Ross Perry
- Produced by: Alex Ross Perry; Peter Kline; Danny Gabai; Craig Butta; Lance Bangs; Alex Needles; Arrow Kruse; Chris Lombardi; Gerard Cosloy; Patrick Amory; Gabe Spierer; Robert Greene
- Starring: Pavement; Rebecca Clay Cole; Gary Young; Joe Keery; Nat Wolff; Fred Hechinger; Logan Miller; Griffin Newman; Tim Heidecker; Jason Schwartzman; Michael Esper; Zoe Lister-Jones; Kathryn Gallagher
- Cinematography: Robert Kolodny
- Edited by: Robert Greene
- Music by: Pavement; Keegan DeWitt; Dabney Morris
- Production companies: Alldayeveryday; Vice Studios; Matador Records; Field Recordings; LBI Entertainment; Monotone Inc.; Hipgnosis; WW7 Entertainment
- Distributed by: Utopia
- Release dates: September 4, 2024 (Venice); May 2, 2025 (Film Forum); June 6, 2025 (United States)
- Running time: 128 minutes
- Country: United States
- Language: English
- Box office: $351,421

Pavements is a 2024 American experimental musical biopic concert film written, co-produced, and directed by Alex Ross Perry. It is a docufiction about the American indie band Pavement, incorporating scripted scenes with documentary footage of the band, a musical stage play consisting of songs from their discography, and a museum devoted to their history.

Pavements premiered at the 81st Venice International Film Festival on September 4, 2024, and was released by Utopia on a limited theatrical release across the United States beginning at the Film Forum in New York City, New York on May 2, 2025, before a wide release on June 6.

== Plot ==
Described as "a semiotic experiment", the film combines elements of documentary with a spoof biopic of the band, and incorporates moments from Slanted! Enchanted! A Pavement Musical, a jukebox musical using Pavement's music. That play is about Essem, an aspiring Stephen Malkmus-like musician in a small town, who meets and falls in love with a woman named Anne, boards a train for New York City with her, is tempted by fame and glory, has an affair with another aspiring musician named Loretta, and wonders if love is worth it. The story loosely tracks the progression and themes of Pavement's works, chronologically. Director of all three projects Alex Ross Perry faces an uphill battle as he tries to wrangle the film together, including reticence on behalf of frontman Stephen Malkmus as Perry films the band’s tours, and biopic leading actor Joe Keery’s psychological descent as he, in a process which parodies Austin Butler’s Method acting process on Elvis, is left still speaking and acting like Malkmus.

== Cast ==
- Stephen Malkmus as himself
- Bob Nastanovich as himself
- Scott Kannberg as himself
- Steve West as himself
- Mark Ibold as himself
- Rebecca Clay Cole as herself
- Gary Young as himself
- Michael Esper as Essem
- Zoe Lister-Jones as Anne
- Kathryn Gallagher as Loretta
- Joe Keery as Stephen Malkmus / himself
- Jason Schwartzman as Chris Lombardi
- Nat Wolff as Scott Kannberg
- Fred Hechinger as Bob Nastanovich
- Logan Miller as Mark Ibold
- Griffin Newman as Steve West
- Tim Heidecker as Gerard Cosloy
- Alex Ross Perry as himself
- Violette Trotter as Donna Matthews
- Ben Arauz as David Berman
- Keith Poulson as Radio DJ
- Holden Seidlitz as himself
- Kim Gordon as herself
- Lindsey Jordan as herself
- Soccer Mommy as herself
- Alicia Bognanno as herself
- Speedy Ortiz as themselves
- Jake Perlin as himself
- Greta Gerwig as herself
- Noah Baumbach as himself

Lucy Benzinger, Brandi Campbell, John El-Jor, Tenaya Kelleher, Joe Laplant, Nicholas Lovalvo, and Sophie Morris appear as ensemble members in Slanted! Enchanted!

== Production ==
Matador Records first approached Perry about creating a film with the band, except that frontman Stephen Malkmus wasn’t interested in hiring a documentary filmmaker, instead wanting to hire a screenwriter who would not write a screenplay. Inspired by the elliptical nature of that request, Perry conceived a version of the project that would defy explanation, comparing it to a film about Bob Dylan that combined D.A. Pennebaker’s Dont Look Back, Todd Haynes’ I'm Not There, Martin Scorsese's Rolling Thunder Revue and Dylan's own Renaldo and Clara.

The film's production included the creation of "Pavements 1933-2022: A Pavement Museum", a touring museum exhibit composed of real and fake artifacts from the band's history.

The production of Slanted! Enchanted! was the first attempt to create a work of musical theater for Perry, who had previously worked with Pavement on a music video for their song “Harness Your Hopes” and aided in creating the aforementioned Pavement Museum. Longtime Perry collaborator Craig Butta produced the play, enlisting Angela Trimbur to choreograph the musical's extensive and complex dance sequences along with co-choreographer Tenaya Kelleher.

Keegan DeWitt and Dabney Morris, film composers and previous collaborators with Alex Ross Perry, worked on the arrangements, re-contextualizing the indie rock slacker songs into the big broadway musical parlance. Cinematographer Robert Kolodny created the on-stage projections which play throughout the entirety of the performance. John Arnos created the set and Amanda Ford designed the costumes.

Michael Esper was cast in the lead of the show, with actor/director Zoe Lister-Jones and Kathryn Gallagher also appearing.

The New York off-Broadway production started previews on December 1, 2022 at the Sheen Center for Thought and Culture in Manhattan's NOHO neighborhood.

A film directed by Perry, entitled Range Life: A Pavement Story, premiered at the Park Slope location of the Nitehawk Cinema on September 14, 2023, described as "a one-of-a-kind, never to be repeated journey through the histories of Pavement." While the screening was not private, it was not advertised as the premiere of the publicized Pavements film project. Like the musical and museum exhibit, the production of this film within a film comprises one strand of Pavements, including footage of the September 2023 "premiere" at the Nitehawk in Brooklyn, complete with red carpet, as well as snapshots of supposed articles promoting Range Life and boasting of its huge budget from the fictitious "Paragon Vantage". (Note: actually a vending machine manufacturer, and likely a spoof of Paramount Vantage) However, it is unclear what movie actually played at that event, and by some accounts it was an early cut of Pavements instead. Footage captured at the screening briefly appears in the final cut of Pavements.

Stephen Malkmus revealed in an October 2024 interview that he had been unhappy with an earlier version of Pavements (possibly the film exhibited as Range Life in 2023, or another edit in the period since), saying it was "not ready for public consumption... unless it was a prank".

== Reception ==
On the review aggregator website Rotten Tomatoes, 95% of 58 critics' reviews are positive. The website's consensus reads: "Directed with a wry personal touch by Alex Ross Perry, Pavements distinguishes itself as a music doc by not only paying affectionate tribute to its subject but also unpacking the cultural philosophy it personifies." Metacritic, which uses a weighted average, assigned the film a score of 76 out of 100, based on 21 critics, indicating "generally favorable" reviews.
