= Harness Your Hopes =

1999 song by Pavement

Song by Pavement

from the EP Spit on a Stranger
- Released: June 22, 1999
- Recorded: 1996
- Genre: Alternative rock; indie rock
- Length: 3:26
- Label: Matador
- Songwriter: Stephen Malkmus
- Producers: Pavement; Bryce Goggin

Music video
- "Harness Your Hopes" on YouTube

"Harness Your Hopes" is a song by American rock band Pavement. It was originally recorded for the band's fourth studio album Brighten The Corners, but was ultimately left off the final record by Stephen Malkmus. It later appeared on the CD version of the "Spit on a Stranger" EP in 1999, and on the 2008 expanded reissue of Brighten The Corners, the Nicene Creedence Edition. It was also a B-side on “Carrot Rope”, which was only released as a single in the United Kingdom. On the commentary track to the group's Slow Century DVD, Stephen Malkmus explained that this single release was at the specific request of the group's UK label, Domino Records following significant playtime on John Peel's Radio 1 show.

In 2017, the song became Pavement's most streamed song on Spotify, surpassing their previous hit "Cut Your Hair," and also became viral on social media app TikTok in 2020. A music video for the song was also released in March 2022, starring actress Sophie Thatcher, in anticipation for the reissue of the Spit on a Stranger EP.

== Background ==
"Harness Your Hopes" was originally written by Stephen Malkmus. While Malkmus liked the song, he left the song off of the album "for no good reason," which was because he thought the song sounded wrong after the band spliced the song to shorten a waltz section that came after the song's chorus, which the band did not tell him about. He then decided to turn it into a B-side.

The song's second verse, "Show me a word that rhymes with pavement/And I won't kill your parents and roast them on a spit," is a joke description of the word "depravement," with Malkmus describing the line as "the kind of thing you write when you're feeling cocky and you think it's a b-side [sic]." This joke continues with the following lyrics "And-a don't you try to etch it, or permanently sketch it" ("engravement")/"Or you're gonna catch a bad, bad cold" ("ailment").

== Belated success ==
The song, having previously never been on the band's top five songs on Spotify, suddenly became Pavement's most streamed song on Spotify in 2017. While the exact causes of the song's popularity are unknown, Stereogum suggested it was due to a change in Spotify's streaming algorithm. It also became viral on TikTok, in 2020 and 2024, with people dancing to the song. On May 20, 2024, it was certified Gold by the Recording Industry Association of America (RIAA), becoming Pavement's first certified release. By the time of being certified Gold, the song had 148 million streams on Spotify. By contrast, "Cut Your Hair," the band's second-most popular song on Spotify, had 42 million streams.

Stephen Malkmus became aware of the success of "Harness Your Hopes" in 2020, when he heard the song playing around a bakery near his home in Portland, Oregon, and was informed by his kids that they knew the song. Scott Kannberg cited the late success of "Harness Your Hopes" as "breath[ing] new life" into Pavement following their breakup, and Malkmus regretted his decision to leave it off the final album.

In April 2025, the track was certified Silver in the UK for 200,000 sales equivalent streams.

== Music video ==
A music video for the song, directed by Alex Ross Perry and starring Yellowjackets actress Sophie Thatcher was released on March 10, 2022, to promote the upcoming re-release of the Spit on a Stranger EP. The video, directly inspired by the 1992 Peter Hyams film Stay Tuned, pays homage to Pavement's old music videos with Thatcher moving through projections of the band's videos. Perry directly received access to the band's music videos from Matador, and used/edited various shots to allow Thatcher to be a part of the videos; however, this was difficult due to varying footage quality, and as the scenery and lighting had to be painstakingly replicated to pull off the idea.

== Certifications ==
Certifications for "Harness Your Hopes"
Region	Certification	Certified units/sales
New Zealand (RMNZ)	Gold	15,000^{‡}
United Kingdom (BPI)	Silver	200,000^{‡}
United States (RIAA)	Platinum	1,000,000^{‡}
^{‡} Sales+streaming figures based on certification alone.
