= What's Up Matador =

What’s Up Matador

Compilation album by Various Artists
- Released: August 26, 1997
- Genre: Indie Rock
- Label: Matador Records

What's Up Matador is a compilation album and promotional video released by American independent record label Matador Records in 1997. In the double-CD version, the first disc contains highlight tracks from the label's catalog from 1991 to 1997, while the second disc contains previously unreleased and rare tracks from Matador artists. A vinyl edition was also released, containing only the unreleased and rare tracks, in addition to two extra songs not available on the CD version.

== Track listing ==
=== 2-CD Edition ===
==== Disc One ====
1. Yo La Tengo - "Tom Courtenay"
2. Pavement - "Texas Never Whispers"
3. Teenage Fanclub - "Catholic Education"
4. Superchunk - "For Tension"
5. Unsane - "Vandal X"
6. Bailter Space - "Splat"
7. Helium - "Pat's Trick"
8. Cat Power - "Nude as the News"
9. Bettie Serveert - "Tomboy"
10. Silkworm - "Couldn't You Wait (Acoustic)"
11. Spoon - "Don't Buy the Realistic"
12. Liz Phair - "Stratford on Guy"
13. Pizzicato Five - "Twiggy Twiggy"
14. The Fall - "Hey Student"
15. Railroad Jerk - "Bang the Drum"
16. Come - "In/Out"
17. The Jon Spencer Blues Explosion - "Dang"
18. Chain Gang - "Son of Sam"
19. The Frogs - "Adam & Steve"
20. Chavez - "Unreal is Here"
21. Guided by Voices - "Motor Away"
22. SF Seals - "Still?"
23. Thinking Fellers Union Local 282 - "My Pal the Tortoise"
24. Mecca Normal - "Water Cuts my Hands"

==== Disc Two ====
1. Cat Power - "Back of Your Head"
2. Come - "Strike"
3. Railroad Jerk - "One Step Forward"
4. The Jon Spencer Blues Explosion - "Dig My Shit!"
5. Guided by Voices - "My Thoughts are a Gas"
6. Spoon - "Telamon Bridge"
7. Pavement - "Killing Moon"
8. Silkworm - "Hangman"
9. Yo La Tengo - "Don't Say a Word (Demo Version)"
10. Barbara Manning - The Blood of Feeling
11. Bettie Serveert - "Life is an Imbecile"
12. Liz Phair - "Stuck on an Island"
13. The For Carnation - "Alfredo's Welcome"
14. Run On - "Days Away"
15. Mecca Normal - "Hurricane Watch"
16. Helium - "Lucy"
17. Chavez - "Theme from 'For Russ'"
18. Tobin Sprout - "Small Parade"
19. Bardo Pond - "The Trail"
20. Pizzicato Five - "Happy Birthday"

=== Vinyl Edition ===
1. Cat Power - "Back of Your Head"
2. Come - "Strike"
3. Railroad Jerk - "One Step Forward"
4. The Jon Spencer Blues Explosion - "Dig My Shit!"
5. Guided by Voices - "My Thoughts are a Gas"
6. Spoon - "Telamon Bridge"
7. Pavement - "Killing Moon"
8. Silkworm - "Hangman"
9. Yo La Tengo - "Don't Say a Word (Demo Version)"
10. Barbara Manning - The Blood of Feeling
11. Bettie Serveert - "Life is an Imbecile"
12. Liz Phair - "Stuck on an Island"
13. The For Carnation - "Alfredo's Welcome"
14. Run On - "Days Away"
15. Mecca Normal - "Hurricane Watch"
16. Helium - "Lucy"
17. Chavez - "Theme from 'For Russ'"
18. Tobin Sprout - "Small Parade"
19. Liquor Giants - "Riverdale"
20. Bardo Pond - "The Trail"
21. Guitar Wolf - "Kawasaki ZII 750 Rock'n'Roll"
22. Pizzicato Five - "Happy Birthday"

== Reception ==
Professional ratings
Review scores
Source	Rating
Allmusic	4/5 stars
The A.V. Club	favorable

The compilation has received positive reviews. Stephen Thomas Erlewine of AllMusic called the first disc "an excellent primer" to "the definitive indie label of the decade," and described the unreleased tracks as "a collector's dream." In a favourable contemporary review, Keith Phipps of The A.V. Club called the compilation "an excellent cross-section of Matador's output." In reviews of later Matador compilations, Pitchfork reviewers reflected positively on What's Up Matador as an "epoch-defining" compilation and "24 of the imprint's greatest moments of all time, along with 20 additional slices of rare songs."

== Video ==
What's Up Matador is also the name of a video directed by Clay Tarver released on VHS highlighting the music and history of Matador Records. The video consists of a faux-educational children's variety show hosted by Bill Boggs interspersed with music videos by Matador artists.

The video features appearances from Railroad Jerk reading from an illustrated history of Matador, Ira Kaplan explaining his guitar setup, Run On describing the realities of touring, Liz Phair answering questions on being famous, Jon Spencer playing the theremin, as well as segments with album art designer Mark Ohe and music video director David Kleiler. Due to a manufacturing error, some copies of the VHS tape were accidentally replaced with copies of Lord of the Dance.

=== Music videos ===
1. Spoon - "Not Turning Off"
2. Railroad Jerk - "Rollercoaster"
3. Yo La Tengo - "From a Motel 6"
4. Guided By Voices - "Motor Away"
5. Pizzicato Five - "Twiggy Twiggy"
6. Silkworm - "Wet Firecracker"
7. Bettie Serveert - "Palomine"
8. Pavement - "Cut Your Hair"
9. Helium - "Pat's Trick"
10. Run On - "Christmas Trip"
11. Liz Phair - "Jealousy"
12. The Jon Spencer Blues Explosion - "Flavor"
13. Chavez - "Unreal is Here"
14. Chain Gang - "Satanic Rockers"

== See also ==
- Everything Is Nice: The Matador Records 10th Anniversary Anthology
- Matador at Fifteen
