= Father to a Sister of Thought =

Single by Pavement

from the album Wowee Zowee
- A-side: "Father to a Sister of Thought"
- B-side: "Kris Kraft"; "Mussle Rock (Is a Horse in Transition)"
- Released: June 27, 1995 (USA)
- Recorded: 12–34 (sic) November 1994
- Studio: Easley Studio (Memphis, Tennessee)
- Genre: Alternative country
- Length: 3:30
- Label: Matador
- Songwriter: Stephen Malkmus
- Producers: Pavement; Doug Easley; Davis McCain

Pavement singles chronology
"Rattled by the Rush" (1995)	"Father to a Sister of Thought" (1995)	"Stereo" (1997)

"Father to a Sister of Thought" is a song written by Stephen Malkmus of Pavement that appears on the band's third album, Wowee Zowee. On June 27, 1995, the song was released as the second single from the album in 7" vinyl and CD-single formats; the track list is the same for both versions. Both B-sides are included amongst the bonus tracks on 2006's deluxe Sordid Sentinels Edition reissue of Wowee Zowee.

== Music video ==
The music video for "Father to a Sister of Thought" features the band playing together in front of a western-themed props painted by Steve Keene, which were also used by the band on tour during the period.

== Track listing ==
No.	Title	Length
1.	"Father to a Sister of Thought"	3:35
2.	"Kris Kraft"	2:48
3.	"Mussle Rock (Is a Horse in Transition)"	3:31
Total length:		9:54
