= Wowee Zowee: Sordid Sentinels Edition =

Compilation album by Pavement
- Released: November 7, 2006
- Recorded: March 3, 1994 – March 15, 1995
- Genre: Indie rock
- Length: 156:15
- Label: Matador

Pavement chronology
Crooked Rain, Crooked Rain: LA's Desert Origins (2004)	Wowee Zowee: Sordid Sentinels Edition (2006)	Brighten the Corners: Nicene Creedence Edition (2008)

Wowee Zowee: Sordid Sentinels Edition is a compilation album by Pavement released on November 7, 2006. It contains the band's 1995 album, Wowee Zowee, in its entirety, as well as outtakes and other rarities from that era, some of which had previously been unreleased.

== Promotion and release ==
Sordid Sentinels Edition was released on November 7, 2006. Matador Records offered extra items to people who pre-ordered the reissue. Those who chose to pre-order the album received a code redeemable on the Sordid Sentinels Edition website for a rare recording of a live Pavement show at the Palace in Los Angeles on April 21, 1994. Also included in the pre-order deal was a free 7-inch record which included previously unreleased studio versions of the songs "Black Out" and "Extradition" and a poster based on a painting that artist Steve Keene originally contributed for the original release of Wowee Zowee in 1995.

== Reception ==
Professional ratings
Review scores
Source	Rating
Blender	5/5 stars
Drowned in Sound	8/10
The Guardian	3/5 stars
Pitchfork	9.3/10
Record Collector	3/5 stars
The Skinny	4/5 stars
Slant Magazine	4.5/5 stars
Spin	4/5 stars
Stylus Magazine	A+
Uncut	4/5 stars

Sordid Sentinels Edition received very positive reviews from critics, with Stylus Magazine describing it as "a large-scale painting of the best that the 90s rock underground had to offer." In contrast, The Guardian did not consider the album's extra tracks essential listenings.

As of 2010, Sordid Sentinels Edition had sold 32,000 copies.

== Track listing ==
=== Disc one ===
Wowee Zowee

1. "We Dance"
2. "Rattled by the Rush"
3. "Black Out"
4. "Brinx Job"
5. "Grounded"
6. "Serpentine Pad"
7. "Motion Suggests Itself"
8. "Father to a Sister of Thought"
9. "Extradition"
10. "Best Friend's Arm"
11. "Grave Architecture"
12. "AT&T"
13. "Flux = Rad"
14. "Fight This Generation"
15. "Kennel District"
16. "Pueblo"
17. "Half a Canyon"
18. "Western Homes"

Wowee Zowee session outtake

19. "Sordid"

Rattled by the Rush EP

20. "Brink of the Clouds"
21. "False Skorpion"
22. "Easily Fooled"

"Father to a Sister of Thought" single

23. "Kris Kraft"
24. "Mussle Rock (Is a Horse in Transition)"

Pacific Trim EP

25. "Give It a Day"
26. "Gangsters & Pranksters"
27. "Saganaw"
28. "I Love Perth"

Wowee Zowee session outtake

29. "Sentinel"

=== Disc two ===
I Shot Andy Warhol soundtrack

1. "Sensitive Euro Man"

Wowee Zowee session outtake

2. "Stray Fire"

Recorded March 3, 1994, at Hilversum, Netherlands

3. "Fight This Generation"
4. "Easily Fooled"

Wowee Zowee session with Doug Easley on piano

5. "Soul Food"

Homage to Descendents tribute album

6. "It's a Hectic World"

Steve Lamacq Evening Session (March 15, 1995)

7. "Kris Kraft"
8. "Golden Boys/Serpentine Pad"
9. "Painted Soldiers"
10. "I Love Perth"

Medusa Cyclone/Pavement split 7-inch

11. "Dancing with the Elders"

Recorded live at Wireless JJJ Radio in Australia (July 7, 1994)

12. "Half a Canyon"
13. "Best Friend's Arm"
14. "Brink of the Clouds/Candylad"
15. "Unfair"
16. "Easily Fooled"
17. "Heaven Is a Truck"
18. "Box Elder"

Schoolhouse Rock! Rocks compilation

19. "No More Kings"

Kids in the Hall: Brain Candy soundtrack

20. "Painted Soldiers"

Wowee Zowee session outtake

21. "We Dance" (alternate mix)
