= Live Europaturnén MCMXCVII (2) =

Live album by Pavement
- Released: April 18, 2009
- Recorded: August 15, 1997
- Genre: Rock
- Labels: Matador Records (1999–present); Matador Records/Capitol Records (1997–1998)
- Producer: Pavement

Pavement chronology
Live Europaturnén MCMXCVII (2008)	Live Europaturnén MCMXCVII (2) (2009)	Quarantine the Past: The Best of Pavement (2010)

Live Europaturnén MCMXCVII (2) is a live album by American indie rock band Pavement, which was recorded at a concert in Cologne, Germany on August 15, 1997. The vinyl-only album was released as part of Record Store Day for 2009. Distribution was limited to 2,500 copies in North America only, including 95 copies pressed on red vinyl, which were randomly distributed to independent stores.

Although the record is a Matador Records release, it has no mention of a record label of any type anywhere on the album or sleeve. And though the album was recorded in Germany, all of the text on the back cover and labels is printed in Spanish. It contains an early rendition of "The Hexx", credited as "And Then", which would subsequently appear on their next studio album, Terror Twilight.

== Track listing ==
=== Side A ===
1. "Shady Lane"
2. "And Then" (The Hexx)
3. "Date w Ikea"
4. "Transport Is Arranged"
5. "Stereo"

=== Side B ===
1. "Kennel District"
2. "Cut Your Hair"
3. "Fin"
4. "Blue Hawaiian"
5. "Grave Architecture"
