= Terror Twilight =

Studio album by Pavement
- Released: June 8, 1999
- Recorded: June – December 1998
- Studios: RPM Studios, New York City; RAK Studios, London
- Genre: Indie rock
- Length: 44:08
- Labels: Matador; Domino; Flying Nun
- Producer: Nigel Godrich

Pavement chronology
Shady Lane (1997)	Terror Twilight (1999)	Spit on a Stranger (1999)

Pavement studio album chronology
Brighten the Corners (1997)	Terror Twilight (1999)

Singles from Terror Twilight
- 1. "Spit on a Stranger" Released: 1999; 2. "Carrot Rope" Released: May 1999

Professional ratings
Review scores
Source	Rating
AllMusic	4/5 stars
Entertainment Weekly	B+
The Guardian	4/5 stars
Los Angeles Times	3/4 stars
Melody Maker	4/5 stars
NME	8/10
Pitchfork	9.2/10 (1999); 7.5/10 (2019)
Rolling Stone	4/5 stars
The Rolling Stone Album Guide	3.5/5 stars
Spin	6/10
The Village Voice	A−

Terror Twilight is the fifth studio album by the American indie rock band Pavement. It was released on June 8, 1999, on Matador Records in the US and Domino Recording Company in the UK.

Terror Twilight was produced by Nigel Godrich, who hoped to create a "straighter" album and bring Pavement to a wider audience. He and the band disagreed over some choices, and the songwriter, Stephen Malkmus, later expressed dissatisfaction with the album. It received positive reviews. It was the final album released during the bands original run, as after finishing the tour for the album, Pavement disbanded. In 2022, Matador released an expanded reissue, Terror Twilight: Farewell Horizontal.

== Background and recording ==
Terror Twilight was produced by the British producer Nigel Godrich, who had gained fame for his work with Radiohead, Beck and R.E.M. Godrich, a Pavement fan, accepted the job without having met the band or seen them perform. Hoping to help them find a bigger audience, he wanted to make an album that "stood up straighter" and would "reach people who were turned off by the beautiful sloppiness of other Pavement records". According to the songwriter, Stephen Malkmus, Godrich asked no fee, asking only for royalties. However, Malkmus said: "We paid for the studio time, of course, which started to get expensive. Because [Godrich] had his own, uh, standards."

The group began work in Sonic Youth's studio in lower Manhattan, New York. Godrich found the studio limiting, so the group moved to RPM Studios near Washington Square Park, where Malkmus estimated three quarters of the album were recorded. Dominic Murcott of High Llamas played drums for two tracks when Steve West could not play in time. Malkmus also played drums on one track. Overdubbing and editing took place in London at RAK Studios and Godrich's studio Shebang. Radiohead guitarist Jonny Greenwood added harmonica on "Platform Blues" and "Billie". Godrich mixed the album at Mayfair Studios.

According to the percussionist, Bob Nastanovich, Godrich struggled with the band's casual approach, and called for more takes than they were used to. Though Nastanovich said Godrich took on a "substantial challenge" and "did a good job", he felt he only connected with Malkmus and disregarded the other band members. Nastanovich realized after several days that Godrich did not know his name. The band was also less familiar with the new material, as it was driven entirely by Malkmus. The guitarist Scott Kannberg was unhappy that Malkmus was not interested in working on songs Kannberg had written, and said Terror Twilight was the hardest Pavement record to make.

Deciding the track list created conflict, Godrich wanted to begin the record with "Platform Blues" and end with "Spit on a Stranger". He felt it should open with a "longer, more challenging song to set the tempo", similar to the 1997 Radiohead album OK Computer. However, the band wanted to open with an "easier" song. Malkmus recalled, "Nigel was like, 'I'm done with this. This is the wrong move. We made a stoner album and you're going halfway.' He's right probably."

== Music and lyrics ==
Many of the tracks were previewed at a pair of solo Malkmus shows in California on August 12–13, 1998. These included "Ann Don't Cry", "Carrot Rope", "Spit On A Stranger", "Platform Blues", "You Are The Light", "Folk Jam", and two others that remain unreleased ("Civilized Satanist," which used a Moby Grape sample, and "Dot Days").

At these shows, Malkmus played electric guitar and sang along with home demo recordings of the songs. The style of the recordings was similar to those found on the compilation At Home With the Groovebox ("Robyn Turns 26" and "Watch Out!"), the B-sides of the "Spit on a Stranger" single ("Rooftop Gambler" and "The Porpoise And The Hand Grenade"), and the demo version of "Major Leagues" found on the Major Leagues EP.

"The Hexx" was a quieter, slowed-down version of a discordant jam that was played extensively on the Brighten The Corners tour. Pavement had recorded a faster, louder version during the Brighten The Corners sessions—in fact, at one point "The Hexx" was to have been the opening track on that album. This recording was edited, retitled "...And Then" and issued as the vinyl B-side to "Spit on a Stranger". The original, full-length recording can be found on Brighten The Corners: Nicene Creedence Edition. The single edit also appears among eight bonus tracks on the vinyl incarnation of the Creedence edition. "Folk Jam", as the name suggests, sees the band jam around a single chord for nearly four minutes and was inspired by the folk rock band Fairport Convention.

The original cover art for Terror Twilight lists the final track, "Carrot Rope," as "...And Carrot Rope." This alternate song title was revived for the 2010 Record Store Day version of Quarantine the Past, even though the song was the fifth track on side one.

Initial UK copies came with a bonus CD-ROM which contained the whole album with a brief track-by-track commentary; film of Stephen Malkmus writing this – and calling for the help of his fellow band members in doing so – can be seen on the Slow Century DVD. The disc also contained the videos for "Stereo" and "Shady Lane" from their previous album Brighten the Corners and a home movie segment containing some footage also seen in the Slow Century DVD.

Nastanovich came up with the title, and said it described the period between dusk and sunset when most traffic accidents occur, as only half of drivers switch on their headlights. His original suggestion was Farewell Horizontal, but he dismissed this as "there was no way I was going to be on the Farewell Horizontal tour for the next year".

== Legacy ==
Terror Twilight was Pavement's final album before their breakup. Godrich later said he could "sense it was the end" during the recording, and that "people had differences of opinion". Fans perceived the lines "The damage has been done / I am not having fun any more" from "Ann Don't Cry" as a veiled reference to the band's end.

During the six-month world tour for Terror Twilight, relationships within the group frayed, especially between Malkmus and the other members. After their show at the 1999 Coachella Festival, Malkmus told his bandmates he did not want to continue. During the final concert of the tour, at Brixton Academy in London on November 20, 1999, Malkmus had a pair of handcuffs attached to his microphone stand and told the audience: "These symbolize what it's like being in a band all these years." About two weeks later, a spokesperson for their record label told NME that Pavement had "retired for the foreseeable future".

Malkmus has been openly critical of the album since its release. In 2015, he told Pitchfork the album was the "accidental child of the Pavement catalog." In 2017, Malkmus described Terror Twilight as "a real classic-rock overproduced $100,000 record. With that much money you should be able to make something good. We made some things that weren't as good as they could've been." In response to the comments, Godrich tweeted: "I literally slept on a friend's floor in NYC to be able to make that album." In 2020, Godrich said that he loved the album and had enjoyed making it. He said: "Maybe there were some internal politics, as there are in any band, but I made a friend forever in Stephen ... The writing may have been on the wall even before I got there, but I don't think I had any part of that."

On April 8, 2022, Pavement released a special edition reissue, Terror Twilight: Farewell Horizontal, including 28 previously unreleased tracks. The vinyl set uses the track listing that Godrich suggested.

== Track listing ==
All tracks are written by Stephen Malkmus.

No.	Title	Length
1.	"Spit on a Stranger"	3:04
2.	"Folk Jam"	3:34
3.	"You Are a Light"	3:54
4.	"Cream of Gold"	3:47
5.	"Major Leagues"	3:24
6.	"Platform Blues"	4:42
7.	"Ann Don't Cry"	4:09
8.	"Billie"	3:44
9.	"Speak, See, Remember"	4:19
10.	"The Hexx"	5:39
11.	"Carrot Rope"	3:52
Total length:		44:08

== Personnel ==
Pavement

- Stephen Malkmus – vocals, guitar
- Bob Nastanovich – percussion, keyboards
- Scott Kannberg – vocals, guitar
- Steve West – drums, percussion
- Mark Ibold – bass, vocals

Additional musicians

- Dominic Murcott – drums on "Major Leagues" and "Carrot Rope"
- Jonny Greenwood – Harmonica on "Platform Blues" and "Billie"

Technical

- Nigel Godrich – production, mixing

== Charts ==
Chart (1999)	Peak position
Australian Albums (ARIA)	63
German Albums (Offizielle Top 100)	63
New Zealand Albums (RMNZ)	24
Norwegian Albums (VG-lista)	20
UK Albums (Official Charts)	19
US Billboard 200	95
Scottish Albums (Official Charts)	16
European Albums (Eurotipsheet)	52

== Bibliography ==
- Jovanovic, Rob (2004). Perfect Sound Forever: The Story of Pavement. (Boston) Justin, Charles & Co. ISBN 1-932112-07-3.
