= David Cross: Oh Come On =

- Directed by: Lance Bangs
- Written by: David Cross
- Produced by: Lance Bangs; Kari A. Coleman
- Starring: David Cross
- Cinematography: Stefan Weinberger
- Edited by: Molly Preston
- Production companies: Comedy Dynamics; Field Recordings
- Distributed by: Comedy Dynamics
- Release date: April 1, 2019 (VOD)
- Running time: 70 minutes
- Country: United States
- Language: English
- Budget: $200,000

David Cross: Oh Come On is a 2019 stand-up comedy film written by American comedian David Cross and directed by Lance Bangs.

== Production ==
Filming happened at The Orange Peel in Asheville, North Carolina. Topics include Cross' own experience at fatherhood and Donald Trump.

== Reception ==
Jason Zinoman at The New York Times claims Cross is "doing more punching than punch lines." Paul Parcellin at Film Threat scored it 9 out of 10.
