= Bill Boggs =

American journalist and television presenter

- Born: William Boggs III; July 11, 1941 (age 85); Philadelphia, Pennsylvania, U.S.
- Education: University of Pennsylvania
- Occupations: Television host, producer, author, professional speaker

William Boggs III (born July 11, 1941) is an American television host and journalist.

== Biography ==
Boggs was born in Philadelphia and graduated from the University of Pennsylvania with a BA. He earned a master's degree from the university's Annenberg School for Communication. He was a celebrity correspondent for the syndicated My Generation television show airing on PBS, featuring interviews inspired by his 2007 HarperCollins book, Got What it Takes?: Successful People Reveal How They Made It to the Top. The book includes interviews with Renée Zellweger, Donald Trump, Sir Richard Branson, Clive Davis, Joe Torre, and others.

His novel, At First Sight (Grosset and Dunlap 1980) and Talk Show Confidential, his one-man show about his TV career, were optioned for a screenplay inspired by his life. Boggs’ Wonder Dog books–The Adventures of Spike the Wonder Dog (Post Hill Press 2020) and Spike Unleashed (Post Hill Press 2023) feature Spike, an English Bull Terrier with a politically incorrect sense of humor and a heart of gold. They tell the story of his rise to fame on both his master's TV talk show and social media, and the price he pays for that fame.

Boggs began his show business career in comedy, when he became the manager for a comedy team named Tom Patchett and Jay Tarses, who were coworkers with Boggs at the Armstrong Cork Company in Lancaster. The three men left Armstrong for show business. While helping to launch their careers Boggs also worked as a substitute teacher in the Philadelphia public school system and later as Assistant Dean of Men, at his alma mater, UPenn. After working with them for three years. Boggs took his first on-camera job at KYW-TV in Philadelphia and stopped managing the team, who went on to write for Bob Newhart, Mary Tyler Moore, and others.

In 1972, Boggs left KYW for then-ABC affiliate WGHP-TV in High Point, North Carolina, where he hosted and produced his first talk show, Southern Exposure. He also hosted the syndicated All Star Anything Goes on ABC in 1977–78.

Boggs was a long-time personality on WNEW-TV (now WNYW) from 1975 to 1986. He succeeded Lee Leonard as host of Midday Live and later did likewise on Saturday Morning Live, replacing Gene Rayburn.

He created the first national restaurant review show, TV Diners, for the Food Network, and spent many years hosting the network's first non-cooking/celebrity interview show, Bill Boggs' Corner Table. He co-executive produced and hosted TV's first syndicated stand-up comedy series, Comedy Tonight (1985–86).

Boggs was executive producer of The Morton Downey Jr. Show and a founding executive producer of TruTV.

Boggs appeared in several film and television dramas including Oz and Miami Vice. He appeared as himself in the movie Eyes of Laura Mars and Trading Places. He has also appeared in several documentaries.

He debuted a solo stage show called Talk Show Confidential in 2003. The show included stories and video clips from his years as a television talk show host. In 1980 he formed Boggs/Baker Productions Inc. with Richard Baker. The company produced several music shows including artists as varied as Lou Reed (A Night with Lou Reed), Bobby Short (Bobby Short & Friends at the Cafe Carlyle), Ian Hunter, Mink DeVille, and a documentary on The Stuttgart Ballet (The Miracle Lives) as well as a syndicated series, Comedy Tonight.

Boggs is a member of the board of directors of the American Popular Song Society, and has been inducted into the Northeast Philadelphia Hall of Fame.

Boggs has performed six stage presentations drawn from his career: Talk Show Confidential, Memories of Sinatra, Fun at the Food Network, A Ratpack Revival, Voices of Our Time, and Confessions of a Talk Show Host.

=== Personal life ===
Boggs has been married four times. His first marriage was to a college classmate but it was annulled. He was married to Canadian actress Linda Thorson, and they had a son. His fourth marriage, to publishing executive Carol Edmunds Campbell, ended in divorce in 2010.

== Filmography ==
Year	Title	Role	Notes
1964–99	Another World	Maury Davidson	3 episodes
1970–74	McLean and Company	Himself	
1978	Eyes of Laura Mars	Himself	
1983	Trading Places	Newscaster	
1986	Comedy Tonight	Himself	Host
1987	Miami Vice	TV Host	Episode: "By Hooker by Crook"
1989	The Lemon Sisters	MC	
1994	Safe Passage	Newsperson #2	
1996	Spin City	Talk Show Moderator	Episode: "A Star is Born"
1996	Sudden Manhattan	Newscaster	
1996	Night Falls on Manhattan	News #2	
1996	Mistrial	N.Y. Reporter	TV movie
1997	The Devil's Advocate	Reporter #2	
1997	What's Up Matador	Himself - Host	
1998	Species II	Bill Boggs	
2001	Double Whammy	Bill Berman	
2001	Oz	Himself	Uncredited; Episode: "Even the Score"
2001	Piñero	Lennon Anchorman	
2001	Carman: The Champion	Himself	
2004	Let's Talk Stock	Himself	Host
2006	Chappelle's Show	Jack Championship	Episode: "Show Business & Lil Jon in Love"
2016	The Comedian	Bill Boggs	
2019	How It Really Happened	Himself	Episode: "David Cassidy: Fatal Secret"
