= Torrance Rises =

1999 mockumentary film by Spike Jonze

- Directed by: Lance Bangs; Spike Jonze
- Produced by: Vincent Landay
- Starring: Spike Jonze; Will Smith; Madonna; Chris Rock; Janeane Garofalo; Sofia Coppola; Regis Philbin; Fatboy Slim
- Distributed by: Palm Pictures
- Release date: 1999
- Running time: 34 minutes
- Language: English

Torrance Rises is a 1999 mockumentary directed by and starring Spike Jonze.

The film is based on a dance group in Torrance, California, and traces their journey to the MTV Video Music Awards presentation. The music video for Fatboy Slim's 1999 song "Praise You", also directed by Jonze, features a street performance by this group.

Torrance Rises also appears in the Palm Pictures compilation The Work Of Director Spike Jonze.
