= Brighten the Corners: Nicene Creedence Edition =

Compilation album by Pavement
- Released: December 9, 2008
- Recorded: July 15, 1996 – August 21, 1997
- Genre: Indie rock
- Length: 154:37
- Label: Matador

Pavement chronology
| Wowee Zowee: Sordid Sentinels Edition (2006) | Brighten the Corners: Nicene Creedence Edition (2008) | Live Europaturnén MCMXCVII (2008) |

Brighten the Corners: Nicene Creedence Edition is a compilation album by Pavement released on December 9, 2008. It contains the band's 1997 album, Brighten the Corners, in its entirety, as well as outtakes and other rarities from that era, some of which had previously been unreleased.

== Release ==
Nicene Creedence Edition was released on December 9, 2008, by Matador Records. The initial pre-order offer also included the band's previously unreleased live album, Live Europaturnén MCMXCVII, on 12" vinyl.

== Critical reception ==
Professional ratings
Aggregate scores
| Source | Rating |
|---|---|
| Metacritic | 92/100 |
Review scores
| Source | Rating |
| The A.V. Club | B |
| Blender | 4/5 stars |
| The Boston Phoenix | 4/4 stars |
| Entertainment Weekly | A |
| Mojo | 4/5 stars |
| Pitchfork | 8.7/10 |
| PopMatters | 9/10 |
| Q | 4/5 stars |
| Rolling Stone | 4.5/5 stars |
| Uncut | 5/5 stars |

Nicene Creedence Edition was acclaimed by critics.

== Track listing ==
=== Disc one ===
Brighten the Corners

1. "Stereo"
2. "Shady Lane / J Vs. S"
3. "Transport Is Arranged"
4. "Date w/ IKEA"
5. "Old to Begin"
6. "Type Slowly"
7. "Embassy Row"
8. "Blue Hawaiian"
9. "We Are Underused"
10. "Passat Dream"
11. "Starlings of the Slipstream"
12. "Fin"

Brighten The Corners outtakes

13. "And Then (The Hexx)" (Originally released as the b-side to "Spit on a Stranger" (OLE-384-7) in May 1999, but presented here is the unedited full version, previously unreleased. It was initially planned to be the opening track to Brighten the Corners.)
14. "Beautiful as a Butterfly"
15. "Cataracts"

Stereo single

16. "Westie Can Drum"
17. "Winner of the"
18. "Birds in the Majic Industry" (previously unreleased full length vocal version)

Spit on a Stranger single (included here since both were recorded and mixed during Brighten the Corners sessions)

19. "Harness Your Hopes"
20. "Roll with the Wind"

=== Disc two ===
Shady Lane single

1. "Slowly Typed"
2. "Cherry Area"
3. "Wanna Mess You Around"
4. "No Tan Lines"

BBC Radio One Evening Session, January 15, 1997

5. "And Then (The Hexx)" (previously unreleased)
6. "Harness Your Hopes" (previously unreleased)
7. "The Killing Moon" (released on Major Leagues EP)
8. "Winner of the" (previously unreleased)

Brighten The Corners outtakes

9. "Embassy Row Psych Intro" (previously unreleased)
10. "Nigel" (previously unreleased)
11. "Chevy (Old to Begin)" (previously unreleased mix)
12. "Roll with the Wind (Roxy)" (previously unreleased mix)

God Save The Clean: A Tribute to the Clean, Flying Nun Records compilation

13. "Odditty"

Tibetan Freedom Concert compilation

14. "Type Slowly" (live)

KCRW Morning Becomes Eclectic, February 25, 1997

15. "Neil Hagerty Meets Jon Spencer in a Non-Alcoholic Bar" (previously unreleased)
16. "Destroy Mater Dei" (previously unreleased)
17. "It's A Rainy Day, Sunshine Girl"
18. "Maybe Maybe"

BBC Radio One John Peel Live Session, August 21, 1997

19. "Date w/ IKEA" (previously unreleased)
20. "Fin" (previously unreleased)
21. "Grave Architecture" (previously unreleased)
22. "The Classical" (released on Major Leagues EP)

WFNX Studios, February 12, 1997

23. "Space Ghost Theme I" (previously unreleased)
24. "Space Ghost Theme II" (previously unreleased)
