= Everything Is Nice: The Matador Records 10th Anniversary Anthology =

Everything is Nice: The Matador Records 10th Anniversary Anthology

Compilation album
- Released: 1999
- Length: 3:13:49
- Label: Matador Records

Professional ratings
Review scores
Source	Rating
Allmusic	4/5 stars

Everything Is Nice: The Matador Records 10th Anniversary Anthology is a 3-disc compilation of tracks from the record label Matador Records from 1989 to 1999 from popular Matador artists such as Pavement, Modest Mouse, Mogwai and Cat Power. Also featuring relatively unknown artists such as Jega and Non Phixion. Alternate names for this compilation include: Don’t Be Afraid of the Product and Chain Gang Video Not Included. Included in the digipak release are 3 CDs and a booklet including the complete Matador discography as of 8/16/1999.

An excerpt from the booklet states, “Cigarettes Are Nice. Feet Are Nice. Police Are Nice. Typhoons Are Nice. James Woods is Nice.”

== Track listing ==
Disc: 1

1. Stereo - Pavement
2. Count Five Or Six - Cornelius
3. Talk About The Blues – The Jon Spencer Blues Explosion
4. Cross Bones Style – Cat Power
5. Flight '96 – Chavez
6. Fire In The Middle – Nightmares On Wax
7. Refuse To Lose – Non Phixion
8. Pitbull – Jega
9. NO TECH! – Unwound
10. Cosmic Rays – Helium
11. Maximum Sunshine - The Lynnfield Pioneers
12. Fujiyama Attack – Guitar Wolf
13. Heart Cooks Brain – Modest Mouse
14. Flux – Bardo Pond

Disc: 2

1. Xmas Steps – Mogwai
2. Sugarcube – Yo La Tengo
3. The Official Ironmen Rally Song – Guided By Voices
4. Banned From The End Of The World – Sleater-Kinney
5. One Louder Solex – Solex
6. The Banjo's Categorical Gut – Matmos
7. Here We Go – Arab Strap
8. Booker To Hooker - Khan
9. Image Of You – Red Snapper
10. Blaze – Arsonists
11. Roygbiv – Boards Of Canada
12. Do The Strand - Burger Ink
13. Tanzen - Pole
14. X-Factor - Void

Disc: 3

1. Windblown - The Lynnfield Pioneers
2. Naked - The Jon Spencer Blues Explosion
3. Sleepwalkers - Non Phixion
4. Universal Skills - Arsonists
5. One Two Three Four Five Six Seven Eight Nine Ten Barbie Dolls – Pizzicato Five
6. Oh Cripes! - Solex
7. Body Dump (Super-8 Mix) - Khan
8. Schtumm – The Wisdom Of Harry
9. Sugarcube (Live) - Yo La Tengo
10. Grounded (Crooked Rain Version) - Pavement
11. Choking Tara (Creamy Version) - Guided By Voices
12. Aging Astronauts II - Mary Timony
13. Long Ride - Bardo Pond
14. Hugh Dallas - Mogwai
15. Sea Of Love - Cat Power
