= Carrot Rope =

Song by Pavement

Single by Pavement

from the album Terror Twilight
- Released: May 16, 1999
- Recorded: 1996–1999
- Genre: Indie rock
- Length: 10:37
- Label: Domino Records
- Songwriter: Stephen Malkmus.
- Producers: Nigel Godrich, ?

Pavement singles chronology
| "Spit on a Stranger" (1999) | "Carrot Rope" (1999) | "Major Leagues EP" (2000) |

"Carrot Rope" is a song from Pavement's 1999 album Terror Twilight. It is erroneously known as "...and Carrot Rope", the "...and" was added to the stylized track listing on the back of Terror Twilight signifying that it is the final song on the album and not actually a part of the title. The song was released as a single in May 1999, exclusively in the United Kingdom. Elsewhere, "Spit on a Stranger" was released instead.

On the commentary track to the group's Slow Century DVD, Stephen Malkmus explained that this single release was at the specific request of the group's UK label, Domino Records following significant playtime on John Peel's Radio 1 show.

The single was Pavement's highest-charting single on the UK Singles Chart, and reached a peak of number 27. It was the group's second and final Top 40 single on the chart. Despite the single's success, it was not included on Quarantine the Past: The Best of Pavement, although it was included on a limited-edition version of the album for Record Store Day, picked by Pavement as the "most imaginative" greatest hits track listing suggested by a fan.

== Carrot Rope Pt. 1 ==
"Carrot Rope Pt. 1" is the first of three different formats of the single, all of which were released on May 16, 1999. All 3 formats carry the album version of the song. This one of 2 compact disc editions. The two B-sides accompanying the title track are both found on the contemporaneous US release of "Spit on a Stranger". The catalogue number for the CD version is RUG90CD1.

=== Track listing ===
1. "Carrot Rope" 3:52
2. "Harness Your Hopes" 3:28
3. "Roll With The Wind" 3:17

"Carrot Rope Pt. 2"

Single by Pavement
- Released: May 16, 1999
- Recorded: 1996 - 1999
- Genre: Indie rock
- Length: 10:02
- Label: Domino Records
- Songwriter: Stephen Malkmus
- Producer: Nigel Godrich

== Carrot Rope Pt. 2 ==
"Carrot Rope Pt. 2" is the second format of the single, again on compact disc. Once again, the two B-sides accompanying the title track were both also released on the US "Spit on a Stranger" single. The catalogue number for the CD version is RUG90CD2.

=== Track listing ===
1. "Carrot Rope" 3:55
2. "The Porpoise & The Hand Grenade" 2:47
3. "Rooftop Gambler" 3:20

"Carrot Rope 7""

Single by Pavement
- Released: May 16, 1999
- Recorded: 1996 - 1999
- Genre: Indie rock
- Length: 8:58
- Label: Domino Records
- Songwriter: Stephen Malkmus.
- Producer: Nigel Godrich

== Carrot Rope 7" ==
Carrot Rope 7" is the last of three different forms of the single this time issued on 7" vinyl. The B-side, "And Then" is actually an early version of "The Hexx" from Terror Twilight recorded several years earlier; it was also issued on the US "Spit on a Stranger" 7" single. The catalogue number for the single is RUG90.

=== Track listing ===
1. "Carrot Rope" 3:52
2. "And Then" 5:06
