= Lance Bangs =

American filmmaker (born 1972)

- Born: September 4, 1972 (age 54); Sacramento, California, U.S.
- Occupations: Filmmaker, music video director
- Spouse: Corin Tucker (m. 2000)
- Children: 2
- Website: lancebangs.com

Lance Bangs (born September 4, 1972) is an American filmmaker and music video director. Bangs has also been heavily involved in the filming and production of MTV's Jackass television series and its subsequent movies.

== Life and career ==
Bangs was born in Sacramento, California. He founded Flicker Film Festival, a series of Super8mm and 16mm film screenings, while in Athens, Georgia, in 1990 along with Michael Lachowski and Angie Grass.

He has created videos for Sonic Youth, Nirvana, Neutral Milk Hotel, Green Day, Arcade Fire, The Shins, The Thermals, Belle & Sebastian, Menomena, Yeah Yeah Yeahs, R.E.M., Mike Watt, Death Cab for Cutie, The Black Keys, Kanye West, Odd Future, Pavement, George Harrison, and Wednesday.

As a commercial director he has worked with United Parcel Service, Nike, Subway, Rock Band and Volvo for several campaigns, including the Titanium Lion-winning campaign for Volvo's "Life on Board Project" campaign from the 2005 Cannes Lions International Advertising Festival.

He produced DVDs for the Directors Label Series, covering the work of Chris Cunningham, Michel Gondry, Spike Jonze, Mark Romanek, Stéphane Sednaoui, Jonathan Glazer and Anton Corbijn. He has also been involved with Spike Jonze on a number of occasions, being one of the cameramen for every single Jackass movie. He also was a part of the Jackassworld.com: 24 Hour Takeover (2008), filming behind the scenes material. In 2009, they were shortlisted for an Academy Award for "Tell Them Anything You Want: A Portrait of Maurice Sendak".

He has aired an ongoing series of short (often music-related) documentaries on VBS.TV since 2007 in the form of his show "Bangs". He also hosts a show on Viceland called Flophouse.

Bangs is married to Corin Tucker of Sleater-Kinney and together they have two children. He has performed musically as well, both with his wife and with Canadian indie rock group The Dudes. There were plans for a west coast summer 2009 tour, billed as Lance Bangs w/ The Dudes.

== Selected filmography ==
=== Music videos ===
- "I Can't Stand It Anymore" by Five-Eight (1993)
- "Tonight I'm Gonna Destroy This World" by Five-Eight (1993)
- "Coupleskate" by Joe Christmas (1994)
- "The Diamond Sea" by Sonic Youth (1995)
- "Game of Pricks" by Guided By Voices (1995)
- "That's When I Reach for My Revolver" by Moby (1996)
- "Capital A" by Lois (1996)
- "How the West Was Won and Where It Got Us" by R.E.M. (1996)
- "New Test Leper" by R.E.M. (1996)
- "Stay" by 60 ft. Dolls (1996)
- "Busy Child" by Crystal Method (1997)
- "Kid in Candy" by The Spinanes (1997)
- "Dirty Dream Number Two" by Belle & Sebastian (1998)
- "Praise You" by Fatboy Slim (1999) (Camera Operator)
- "Spit on a Stranger" by Pavement (1999)
- "Carrot Rope" by Pavement (1999)
- "Major Leagues" by Pavement (1999)
- "Major Leagues (Wrestling Version)" by Pavement (1999)
- "Let It Snow" by Luscious Jackson (1999)
- "Last Ride In" by Green Day (1999)
- "The Wrong Girl" by Belle & Sebastian (2000)
- "The Time of Your Life" by The Yo-Yos (2000)
- "Hewlett's Daughter" by Grandaddy (2000)
- "New Slang" by The Shins (2001)
- "Know Your Onion!" by The Shins (2002)
- "Commerce, TX" by Ben Kweller (2002)
- "We Want Fun" by Andrew W.K. (2002)
- "The Hardest Button to Button" by The White Stripes (director of photography) (2003)
- "No Culture Icons" by The Thermals (2003)
- "Tied a Reed 'Round My Waist" by Mike Watt (2005)
- "Neighborhood #3 (Power Out)" by Arcade Fire (2005)
- "Neighborhood #1 (Tunnels)" by Arcade Fire (with Josh Deu)(2005)
- "Heard 'Em Say" by Kanye West (director of photography) (2005)
- "Talking Like Turnstiles" by Death Cab for Cutie (2005)
- "Wet and Rusting" by Menomena (2007)
- "Down Boy" by Yeah Yeah Yeahs (2007)
- "10x10" by Yeah Yeah Yeahs (2007)
- "Rockers To Swallow" by Yeah Yeah Yeahs (2007)
- "Isis" by Yeah Yeah Yeahs (2007)
- "Kiss, Kiss" by Yeah Yeah Yeahs (2007)
- "Declare Independence" by Björk (cinematographer) (2007)
- "Strange Times" by The Black Keys (2008)
- "Karaoke" by T-Pain (director of photography) (2008)
- "Now We Can See" by The Thermals (director) (2009)
- "Oldie" by OFWGKTA (director) (2012)
- "Biker Gone" by Kim Deal (2014)
- "Hopeless" by Screaming Females (director) (2015)
- "Dope Cloud" by Protomartyr (director) (2016)
- "I'll Make You Sorry" by Screaming Females (director) (2018)
- "Everybody Needs You" by Laura Veirs (director) (2018)
- "My Sweet Lord (2020 Mix)" by George Harrison (writer and director) (2021)
- "Roman Candles" by Death Cab for Cutie (2022)
- "Here to Forever" by Death Cab for Cutie (2022)
- "Fantastic" by Joe Strummer (2022)
- "Luna Moth" by Maya Hawke (director and producer) (2022)
- "Pages" by White Reaper (2022)
- "Wristwatch" by MJ Lenderman (director and producer) (2025)
- "Townies" by Wednesday (director and producer) (2025)
- "I Couldn't Say It To Your Face" by Daffo (2026)
- "Born to Kill" by Social Distortion (2026)
- "One Thing At A Time" by Courtney Barnett (2026)

=== Video ===
- Green Day: European Tour Fiasco (director) (1996)
- "Jeff Mangum: Starlit Crypt" (director) (1997)
- Pavement: Slow Century (co-director) (2002)
- Let America Laugh (director, producer, director of photography) (2003)
- The Hives: Live on The Sunset Strip (director, producer, director of photography) (2003)
- Corporate Ghost (director) (2004)
- With the Lights Out (producer, director, editor) (2004)
- Tell Me What Rockers to Swallow (director, producer, cinematographer) (2004)
- September in Brooklyn: The Making of Block Party (director, producer, cinematographer) (2005)
- Ohio Players (director, producer, cinematographer) (2005)
- Broken Music (director, cinematographer) (2005)
- Inside the Mind of Michel Gondry (producer) (2005)
- Glasslands (director, producer, cinematographer) (2007)
- Deitch Projects Art Parade (director, producer) (2007)
- The Gossip Live in Liverpool (director, producer, cinematographer) (2007)
- Gather 'Round Now (director, producer, cinematographer) (2007)
- Passaic Mosaic (director, producer, cinematographer) (2008)
- Impossible Situation Getaway: The Making of Be Kind Rewind (director, producer, cinematographer) (2008)
- Booker T & The Michel Gondry (director, producer, cinematographer) (2008)
- Black Keys: Live at the Crystal Ballroom (producer, director) (2008)
- Death Cab For Cutie: Live at the Hall of Justice (producer, director) (2008)
- David Cross: Bigger & Blackerer (director, cinematographer) (2010)
- LCD Soundsystem at Madison Square Garden (tour visuals) (2011)

=== Film ===
- Being John Malkovich (documentarian) (1999)
- Torrance Rises (director, director of photography) (1999)
- Run Ronnie Run (documentarian) (2001)
- Adaptation. (documentarian) (2002)
- Jackass: The Movie (camera operator) (2002)
- "Exile on Main St. (tour visuals)" for The Rolling Stones (2002)
- "Some Girls (tour visuals)" for The Rolling Stones (2002)
- Let America Laugh (documentarian) (2003)
- "Sweet Emotion (tour visuals)" for Aerosmith (2003)
- "I've Been Twelve Forever" (director) (2003) Directors Label
- "NotNa" (director) (2005) Directors Label
- Screaming Masterpiece (cinematographer) (2005)
- Unknown White Male (cinematographer) (2005)
- Dave Chappelle's Block Party (camera operator, 2nd unit director of photography) (2006)
- Jackass Number Two (camera operator) (2006)
- Jackass 2.5 (camera operator) (2007)
- Be Kind, Rewind (documentarian) (2008)
- Where the Wild Things Are (documentarian) (2009)
- Tell Them Anything You Want: A Portrait of Maurice Sendak (director) (2009)
- "Family Portrait" (director) (2009)
- How To Blow Up A Helicopter (Ayako's Story) (cinematographer) (2009)
- Collaborators (director) (2009)
- PAUL (documentarian) (2010)
- The Lazarus Effect (director) (2010)
- I'm Here (behind the scenes documentarian) (2010)
- Jackass 3D (camera operator) (2010)
- Jackass 3.5 (camera operator) (2011)
- Jackass Presents: Bad Grandpa (camera operator) (2013)
- Jackass Presents: Bad Grandpa .5 (camera operator) (2014)
- Breadcrumb Trail (2014)
- Jackass Forever (camera operator) (2022)
- Jackass 4.5 (camera operator, co-executive producer) (2022)
- Jackass: Best and Last (camera operator) (2026)

=== Television ===
- Jackass (camera operator) (2000-2001)
- Sonic Youth Video Dose (director) (2004)
- Nirvana: With The Lights Out (produced/directed) (2004)
- Jackassworld.com: 24 Hour Takeover (behind the scenes documentarian) (2008)
- HBO First Look: Where the Wild Things Are (director, producer) (2009)
- Loiter Squad (executive producer) (2012-2014)
- The Greatest Event in Television History (director) (2012-2014)
- Portlandia
  - "Winter in Portlandia" (actor) (2012)
  - "4th of July" (actor) (2015)
  - "Abracadabra" (director) (2018)
- The Meltdown with Jonah and Kumail (director) (2014–2016)
- Flophouse (creator, presenter) (2016)
- I Don't Belong Here (director) (2022)
- The Prank Panel (cameraman, behind-the-scenes producer) (2023)

=== Specials ===
- John Hodgman: Ragnarok (director) (2013)
- Marc Maron: Thinky Pain (director) (2013)
- Chelsea Peretti: One of the Greats (Netflix) (director) (2014)
- Todd Barry: The Crowd Work Tour (director) (2014)
- Brent Morin: I'm Brent Morin (Netflix) (director) (2015)
- Hannibal Burress: Comedy Camisado (director) (2016)
- Fred Armisen: Standup For Drummers (Netflix) (director) (2018)
- David Cross: Oh Come On (Netflix) (director) (2019)
- Brandon Wardell: Summer 2019 (LEAKED EPIC STANDUP COMEDY SET) (GONE SEXUAL?!?) (director) (2021)
- Michelle Wolf: Joke Show (Netflix) (director) (2019)
