= Pacific Trim =

EP by Pavement
- Released: January 23, 1996
- Genre: Indie rock
- Length: 7:37
- Label: Matador Records

Pavement chronology
Wowee Zowee (1995)	Pacific Trim (1996)	Brighten the Corners (1997)

Professional ratings
Review scores
Source	Rating
Allmusic	3.5/5 stars
Christgau's Consumer Guide	B+
The New Rolling Stone Album Guide	4/5 stars
Stylus Magazine	favorable

Pacific Trim is the fifth EP released by American indie rock band Pavement on January 23, 1996 through Matador Records. It was recorded on short notice to coincide with the band's Australian tour.

== Background ==
The recording features only Stephen Malkmus, Bob Nastanovich and Steve West — the session had actually been booked for a Silver Jews recording, but David Berman became unavailable at the last minute and the group couldn't afford to waste the studio time. The CD release contained three tracks with a fourth song, "I Love Perth", included only on the vinyl edition, which references the city of Perth in Western Australia. Allmusic concludes that the EP "isn't much more than a throwaway, but it is an extremely enjoyable one".

Although the EP is out of print, all four songs are available on the two-CD set Wowee Zowee: Sordid Sentinels Edition.

== Track listing ==
1. "Give It a Day" – 2:37
2. "Gangsters and Pranksters" – 1:29
3. "Saganaw" – 3:31
4. "I Love Perth" – 1:08 (vinyl version only)
