= Wowee Zowee =

1995 studio album by Pavement

Studio album by Pavement
- Released: April 11, 1995
- Recorded: November 14–24, 1994; February 10–14, 1995
- Studios: Easley Recording, Memphis, Tennessee; Random Falls, New York City
- Genres: Indie rock; experimental rock
- Length: 55:51
- Label: Matador
- Producer: Pavement

Pavement chronology
Crooked Rain, Crooked Rain (1994)	Wowee Zowee (1995)	Pacific Trim (1997)

Pavement studio album chronology
Crooked Rain, Crooked Rain (1994)	Wowee Zowee (1995)	Brighten the Corners (1997)

Singles from Wowee Zowee
- 1. "Rattled by the Rush" Released: March 30, 1995; 2. "Father to a Sister of Thought" Released: June 27, 1995

Wowee Zowee is the third studio album by American indie rock band Pavement, released on April 11, 1995, by Matador Records. Most of it was recorded at Easley Recording in Memphis, Tennessee, where some members of the band had previously worked on Silver Jews' 1994 album Starlite Walker. The album showcases a more experimental side of the band, marking a return to the clatter and unpredictability of their early recordings after the more accessible sound of their 1994 studio album Crooked Rain, Crooked Rain. Its eclectic nature ranges from mellow yet distorted melodies to noise and punk rock, while the lyrics generally explore humorous and cryptic themes. At nearly one hour long, Wowee Zowee is Pavement's longest studio album, filling three sides of a vinyl record. Side four was left blank.

Upon release, Wowee Zowee received mixed reviews from critics, being generally deemed as a sloppy effort in comparison to its acclaimed predecessor. However, some reviewers highlighted its adventurous style and Stephen Malkmus' lyricism. Two songs from the album, "Rattled by the Rush" and "Father to a Sister of Thought", were released as singles in 1995, but neither were successful. Despite being notable for ruining any opportunity Pavement had to capitalize on the success of Crooked Rain, Crooked Rain, Wowee Zowee has retrospectively been reappraised in highly positive terms, with Rolling Stone including it in the magazine's 2020 edition of The 500 Greatest Albums of All Time. A compilation containing the album in its entirety as well as B-sides and other rarities, titled Wowee Zowee: Sordid Sentinels Edition, was released in 2006.

== Background and recording ==
Wowee Zowee is the follow-up to Pavement's acclaimed second studio album Crooked Rain, Crooked Rain, which was released in February 1994 and ranked No. 2 in The Village Voice's Pazz & Jop critics' poll. Although the band was starting to get some attention from the mainstream press, they were not interested in signing to a major label. Eight months after the release of their second album, having toured non-stop for two years, Pavement decided to record their next album at Easley Recording in Memphis, Tennessee. Singer and guitarist Stephen Malkmus, percussionist Bob Nastanovich, and drummer Steve West were familiar with the place because they had already worked on Silver Jews' 1994 album Starlite Walker there. Unlike previous Pavement albums, Wowee Zowee was recorded with all five members in attendance.

Although the recording sessions only lasted from November 14 to 24, 1994, Pavement recorded many songs. Some were outtakes from Crooked Rain, Crooked Rain that were re-recorded with better equipment, while others had already been part of the band's setlist for a year. Singer and guitarist Scott Kannberg also wrote a few songs. Previously, he would occasionally write some pieces for Malkmus to sing, but Malkmus encouraged him to sing his own songs this time. The recording sessions, which typically started at noon and ended by 10pm, were very spontaneous. According to Malkmus, "it was just sprawl, just do whatever you want, and don't worry about it fitting together. The less it fits together, the better." Pavement really enjoyed Memphis' relaxed vibe, and would often go out in between sessions to eat at barbecues and drink beer. When the recording sessions concluded, the band mixed and overdubbed the tracks at Random Falls in Manhattan, New York City in February 10–14, 1995, the same studio where they had recorded Crooked Rain, Crooked Rain.

Wowee Zowee is the only Pavement album that was entirely sequenced by Malkmus. The band ended up with more than 20 songs to choose from and originally considered the possibility of putting them all on a record. Kannberg, who had sequenced their previous albums, preferred a cohesive set of roughly 10 songs that would flow together, but Malkmus was keen to include songs that were considered B-sides by the band. Ultimately, a total of 18 songs were included on the album, filling three sides of a vinyl record. Side four was left blank, with an empty thought bubble printed on the label. At nearly one hour long, Wowee Zowee is Pavement's longest studio album. Malkmus explained that, in his mind, everything made sense. He also described the opening track, "We Dance", as "a little torch song thing", and felt that the track would work as a good introduction to the album because it would show that the band was doing something different.

== Music and lyrics ==
Wowee Zowee showcases a more experimental side of Pavement, returning them to the clatter and unpredictability of their early recordings after the more accessible sound of Crooked Rain, Crooked Rain. Distortion and feedback are often combined with mellow melodies, resulting in many songs having unusual structures and disjointed musical styles. Noise rock is prevalent on some tracks, like "Serpentine Pad" and "Best Friends Arm", while "Flux = Rad" is a punk song that was described as reminiscent of Nirvana's "Territorial Pissings". The opening track "We Dance" is a ballad that features acoustic guitars and piano, while "Father to a Sister of Thought" is a quasi-alternative country song that uses a pedal steel guitar. Malkmus played a Gibson SG with P-90 pickups on "Rattled by the Rush", which also features occasional harmonica at points. Due to higher production values, the album generally lacks the lo-fi aesthetic of its predecessors.

Most lyrics on Wowee Zowee explore humorous and cryptic themes. Although many songs give the impression that their lyrics are nonsensical, they can unpack a meaning on further inspection. For example, "Grounded", which suggests that something bad might happen after a doctor leaves for a routine holiday while his unsupervised teenage daughter parties, can be interpreted as an account of middle class decadence. The song "Half a Canyon" mostly focuses on an over-driven guitar sound that Malkmus had never heard before. The lyrics are meaningless and were simply added for decoration; Malkmus said that he screamed so hard towards the end of the song that he scared himself. He thought that he would have an aneurysm and decided to never scream like that again. Kannberg's "Kennel District", which was described as a fuzzy power pop song, is considered one of the album's most accessible songs because it features a traditional verse-chorus-verse structure.

== Packaging and release ==
The cover art for Wowee Zowee is a painting by American artist Steve Keene, who caricatured it from a photograph originally found in Life magazine's 1972 World Library title The Arab World. It depicts two Arab women and a goat. Omitted from Keene's photograph is a girl in a tan dress holding a baby, stationed between the two sitting women. The caption below the original photo reads, "A midday rest is enjoyed by three Arab women and a goat on an arbor-shaded porch. Fellahin women often wear black robes over their other clothing." Malkmus saw the artwork during a live painting session at one of Keene's exhibitions. He chose the piece due to its resemblance to the front cover of Guru Guru's 1972 album Känguru, one that he had always admired. The album's title is a homage to the band's former drummer Gary Young, who would frequently yell "Wowee Zowee" when excited. The phrase "Dick-Sucking Fool at Pussy-Licking School" was originally suggested by Nastanovich as a potential title for Wowee Zowee, but it was discarded after being considered too risqué. Nevertheless, the phrase was included in the album's booklet art. The would-be title was a nod to the Rolling Stones' documentary film Cocksucker Blues.

Wowee Zowee was released on April 11, 1995, by Matador Records. Big Cat Records and Domino Records issued the album in Europe, Fellaheen Records released it in Australia, and King and Pony Canyon released Wowee Zowee in Japan. The album peaked at number 18 on the UK Albums Chart and number 25 on the New Zealand Albums Chart. Malkmus chose the songs "Rattled by the Rush" and "Father to a Sister of Thought" to be released as singles on March 30 and June 27, 1995, respectively, but they were not successful. He would later recall that, while his judgment may have been clouded by excessive marijuana usage, both songs "sounded like hits" to him. To promote Wowee Zowee, the band was planning to organize their own festival with fellow bands such as Sonic Youth, the Breeders, and Beck. However, after Sonic Youth was chosen to headline the Lollapalooza music festival in the summer of 1995, they asked for Pavement to be on the bill. Performing at Lollapalooza became the highest profile appearance for the band and gave them an opportunity to earn a lot of money. In early 1996, they performed a few more shows in Australia, Japan, and the US.

== Critical reception ==
Professional ratings
Contemporary reviews
Review scores
Source	Rating
Chicago Tribune	2.5/4 stars
The Guardian	1/4 stars
Los Angeles Times	2.5/4 stars
Q	3/5 stars
Rolling Stone	2.5/5 stars
Select	4/5
Spin	7/10
The Village Voice	A

Upon release, Wowee Zowee was met with mixed reviews from critics. Rolling Stone editor Mark Kemp described it as a "scattered and sloppy" effort with "half-baked" performances by Malkmus and Kannberg. He also speculated that the relative success of Crooked Rain, Crooked Rain was a reason for the album's eclectic nature, claiming that Pavement were afraid of success. Similarly, the Los Angeles Times editor Lorraine Ali called Wowee Zowee "a sloppy effort, even in Pavement terms", and concluded that the album "comes off lazy and unfinished, never attempting to reach out or connect as previous albums did". Kevin McKeough of the Chicago Tribune felt that the album was inconsistent, highlighting the songs "Rattled by the Rush", "Grounded", and "Kennel District" as "thrilling pleasures", but criticized Malkmus' "insufferably mannered vocals" on "Brinx Job", his "tiresome grunge rant" on "Serpentine Pad", and his "gratuitous screaming" at the end of "Half a Canyon".

In a very negative review, Caroline Sullivan of The Guardian found Wowee Zowee difficult to enjoy, stating that it "probably helps to be a 15-year-old boy to appreciate Pavement", and believed the band does not "release albums so much as in-jokes and their fourth continues the tradition". She added that Malkmus' "monotone occasionally gives way to a pained little yips" and Kannberg "sometimes hits on a lifting melody, but mostly he sounds as confused as his colleagues". Spin writer Eric Weisbard reacted with muted praise, noting the album's "impressively distinct range of sounds and moods", while criticizing Malkmus' unconvincing vocal delivery. He concluded that the album is best enjoyed "at a casual low volume, with little attention paid to the effort and details".

Other critics were more positive. Writing for CMJ New Music Monthly, editor Michael Vazquez considered Wowee Zowee a solid and ambitious album, praising its adventurous style and Malkmus' rich lyricism, but acknowledged that several listens are required for appreciation. Select editor Roy Wilkinson felt that the album has a lot of Pavement's "lazy elegance" and compared the "elegiac sweeps" of "We Dance" to David Bowie's 1971 album Hunky Dory. Robert Christgau of The Village Voice was the album's boldest defender, praising Pavement for favoring lyricism over commerciality. He also felt that the album was mellow and rarely chaotic, concluding: "if their vocation is beguiling song-music that doesn't sound like anything else or create its own rut, this reinforces one's gut feeling that they can do it forever." Despite the middling reviews from most critics, Wowee Zowee was ranked number 17 in the 1995 Pazz & Jop poll.

== Legacy ==
Professional ratings
Retrospective reviews
Review scores
Source	Rating
AllMusic	4.5/5 stars
The Rolling Stone Album Guide	4/5 stars
Spin	5/5 stars
Uncut	4/5 stars

Wowee Zowee ruined any opportunity Pavement had to capitalize on the success of Crooked Rain, Crooked Rain. By June 2009, the album had sold 129,000 copies according to Nielsen SoundScan, a notable drop-off from its predecessor, which had sold 246,000 copies. Kannberg acknowledged that the band felt a bit under pressure to release a follow-up to Crooked Rain, Crooked Rain, and that Wowee Zowee would have been much different if they had given themselves more time to think about it. As a result, Pavement decided to be more patient and work on tidier arrangements for their next studio album, Brighten the Corners (1997). Kannberg regards Wowee Zowee with mixed feelings and considers it his least favorite Pavement record. Conversely, when asked about his favorite Pavement album, Malkmus said, "It would be one of the first three ones, but for different reasons." In 1997, Nastanovich stated that Wowee Zowee is his favorite Pavement record.

Retrospectively, Wowee Zowee has been reappraised in highly positive terms and is frequently viewed by many "diehard" Pavement fans as the band's best work. AllMusic editor Stephen Thomas Erlewine wrote that repeated listenings reveal the album to be "a dense collage of '90s rock & roll that recasts the past and present into one rich, kaleidoscopic, and blissfully cryptic world view". Nina Corcoran of Consequence said that Wowee Zowee has become "the beloved oddball in Pavement's discography", and assumed that the band "knew what they were doing all along, even if we were reluctant to believe them at first". In 2006, Matador released Wowee Zowee: Sordid Sentinels Edition, a compilation containing Wowee Zowee in its entirety, as well as B-sides, outtakes, radio shots, live songs, and compilation tracks from the same era.

According to Rolling Stone writer Rob Sheffield, Wowee Zowee has come to be widely viewed as a "masterpiece". Sheffield explained that people started to appreciate Wowee Zowee after the band released Brighten the Corners, a radical departure that put the album's eclectic nature into perspective. He also remarked that the former was overshadowed by other successful Matador releases, such as Alien Lanes by Guided by Voices and Electr-O-Pura by Yo La Tengo. In 2020, Rolling Stone ranked the album 265th in its updated list of The 500 Greatest Albums of All Time—ahead of Crooked Rain, Crooked Rain and behind Pavement's 1992 debut album, Slanted and Enchanted, which were ranked 434th and 199th, respectively. Several musicians, including American pianist Johnny Iguana, American multi-instrumentalist Jeff Rosenstock, and Filipino-British singer-songwriter Beabadoobee, cited the album as having a profound impact on them.

== Track listing ==
All tracks are written by Stephen Malkmus unless otherwise noted.

Wowee Zowee track listing
No.	Title	Writer(s)	Length
1.	"We Dance"		3:01
2.	"Rattled by the Rush"		4:16
3.	"Black Out"		2:10
4.	"Brinx Job"		1:31
5.	"Grounded"		4:14
6.	"Serpentine Pad"		1:16
7.	"Motion Suggests" (titled "Motion Suggests Itself" in Wowee Zowee: Sordid Sentinels Edition)		3:15
8.	"Father to a Sister of Thought"		3:30
9.	"Extradition"		2:12
10.	"Best Friend's Arm"		2:19
11.	"Grave Architecture"		4:16
12.	"AT & T"		3:32
13.	"Flux = Rad"		1:45
14.	"Fight This Generation"		4:22
15.	"Kennel District"	Scott Kannberg	2:59
16.	"Pueblo"		3:25
17.	"Half a Canyon"		6:10
18.	"Western Homes"	Scott Kannberg	1:49
Total length:			55:51

== Personnel ==
Credits are adapted from the album's liner notes.

Pavement

- Stephen Malkmus – vocals, guitar; drums (track 12)
- Scott Kannberg – guitar, vocals
- Mark Ibold – bass guitar
- Bob Nastanovich – percussion, vocals
- Steve West – drums (ext 12); percussion

Additional musicians

- Doug Easley – pedal steel (track 8)
- Sibel Firat – cello (track 14)

Technical

- Davis McCain – engineer
- Mark Venezia – engineer
- Doug Easley - engineer
- Stephen Malkmus - mixing
- Bryce Goggin – mixing
- Jan BL – mixing
- Rich Costey – mixing
- Gregory Hull – mastering

== Charts ==
1995 chart performance for Wowee Zowee
Chart (1995)	Peak position
Australian Albums (ARIA)	119
Belgian Albums (Ultratop Flanders)	37
Dutch Albums (Album Top 100)	75
German Albums (Offizielle Top 100)	60
New Zealand Albums (RMNZ)	25
UK Albums (Official Charts)	18
US Billboard 200	117
Scottish Albums (Official Charts)	27
European Albums (Eurotipsheet)	58
