= Spit on a Stranger =

Single by Pavement

from the album Terror Twilight
- Released: June 22, 1999
- Recorded: 1996–1998
- Genre: Indie rock
- Length: 3:04
- Label: Matador
- Songwriter(s): Stephen Malkmus
- Producer(s): Nigel Godrich

Pavement singles chronology
"Stereo" (1997)	"Spit on a Stranger" (1999)	"Carrot Rope" (1999)

Professional ratings
Review scores
Source	Rating
Allmusic	2/5 stars
Pitchfork Media	8.0/10

"Spit on a Stranger" is a single by American indie rock band Pavement, released as a single on June 22, 1999, from their final record Terror Twilight. It includes the song "Harness Your Hopes", which would become the band's most listened song on the streaming platform Spotify in 2017. A reissue of the EP was released on 8 April 2022, and the announcement of the reissue was accompanied by a music video for “Harness Your Hopes”.

== Track listing ==
1. "Spit on a Stranger" [Album Version] – 3:04
2. "Harness Your Hopes" – 3:26
3. "Roll with the Wind" – 3:17
4. "The Porpoise and the Hand Grenade" – 2:47
5. "Rooftop Gambler" – 3:20
6. "Harness Your Hopes (Live in Brixton)" [Reissue bonus track] - 3:34

== Cover versions ==
"Spit on a Stranger" has been covered by various artists. Alternative versions include one from progressive bluegrass band Nickel Creek on 2002's This Side, and another recorded by singer-songwriter Kathryn Williams on 2004's Relations.
