= Steve Keene =

American artist (born 1957)

- Born: Virginia
- Education: Virginia Commonwealth University (BFA); Yale University (MFA)
- Known for: Art
- Website: www.stevekeene.com

Steve Keene (born 1957) is an American painter known as a prolific creator of affordable art.

== Early life and education ==
Originally from Charlottesville, Virginia, Keene earned a BFA from Virginia Commonwealth University and a MFA from Yale University.

== Career ==
When Keene was a volunteer DJ at the college radio station WTJU in Charlottesville, Virginia in the 1990s, he became friends with musician David Berman and future members of the band Pavement, and seeing them hustle to sell CDs and merchandise shaped his approach to producing and selling art. According to the bio on his webpage, Keene said, "I want buying my paintings to be like buying a CD: it’s cheap, it's art and it changes your life, but the object has no status. Musicians create something for the moment, something with no boundaries and that kind of expansiveness is what I want to come across in my work."

Described as the "assembly-line Picasso" by Time, Keene's approach is to paint quickly, lining up plywood panels and painting the same image on each. By this method, he reportedly uses around "five gallons of paint a week and 100 sheets of 4-by-8-foot plywood, which he cuts up into 'canvases,' every month."

Keene began his career selling his work at indie rock shows. He purposely kept the price of the work inexpensive, he said, "so that people would buy them, and I wouldn't have to take them back home."

In addition to selling pieces by quantity on his website, he has created album art, video sets, stage sets, and posters for bands including Silver Jews, Pavement, The Apples in Stereo, Soul Coughing, The Klezmatics, and Dave Matthews Band.

Keene has painted live as part of exhibitions and residencies across the country. In November 1997 he "worked in the window of the Goldie Paley Gallery at the Moore College of Art and Design in Philadelphia." He painted more than 10,000 pieces as part of the exhibition "The Miracle Half-Mile" at the Santa Monica Museum of Art, and then did another painting residency at the museum in August 2011. The Brooklyn Public Library named Keene its 2014 Artist-in-Residence, for which he exhibited "Steve Keene’s Brooklyn Experience" in the Central Library's Grand Lobby, led art workshops for children, and painted live outside of the Central Library for several weekends during the summer. To honor Keene during the Library residency, Brooklyn Borough President Eric Adams declared June 14, 2014, as Steve Keene Day.

His work has also been exhibited internationally in England, Germany, and Australia, and has been on display in two of David Chang's restaurants.

As of 2021, Keene estimates he has sold or given away more than 300,000 paintings.

== The Steve Keene Art Book ==
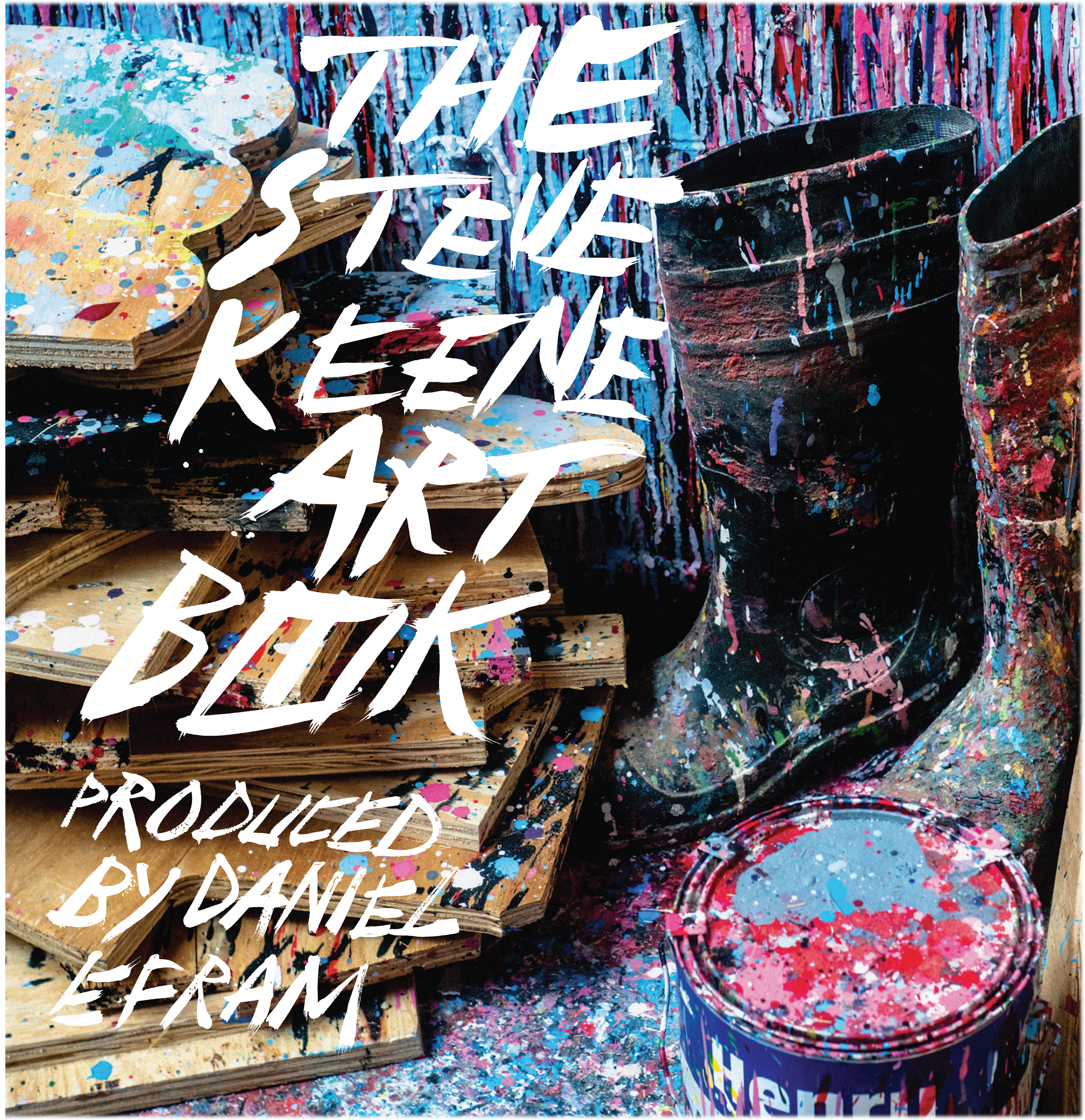
The Steve Keene Art Book, cover image photo by Daniel Efram

In early 2023, The Steve Keene Art Book, produced/edited/curated by Daniel Efram, was co-published by Efram's Tractor Beam and Hat & Beard Press.

== 30-Year Retrospectives in New York & Los Angeles ==
In 2022, to assist with launching the book, Keene participated in 30-year retrospectives in both Los Angeles, Calif., and Brooklyn, N.Y. Curated and produced by Efram, these events featured over one hundred pieces at each event (many of which ended up in book as well as pieces from local collections), experiential painting in situ by Keene, and music performances in the spaces.

== Press Coverage ==
- The New York Times "Steve Keene Made 300,000 Paintings in a Home Full of Easels
- ''The New York Times'' "Steve Keene Made 300,000 Paintings in a Home Full of Easels - non-paywall
- The New Yorker "Mile-a-Minute Plywood Painter Steve Keene Has a Retrospective"
- ''The New Yorker'' "Mile-a-Minute Plywood Painter Steve Keene Has a Retrospective"- non-paywall
- Rolling Stone "Steve Keene Is Your Favorite Band’s Favorite Painter"
- Pitchfork "Meet the Wildly Prolific Painter Who’s Made Album Covers for Pavement, Silver Jews, and More"
- Variety "Steve Keene, Indie Rock Illustrator for Pavement, More, Releases Book"
- Forbes "Kickstarter-Funded ‘The Steve Keene Art Book’ To Be Published In June"
- Billboard "The Steve Keene Art Book: Indie Rock Painter Tribute Book Excerpt"
