= Stereo (Pavement song) =

1997 single by Pavement

Single by Pavement

from the album Brighten the Corners
- B-side: "Westie Can Drum"; "Winner of The"
- Released: January 27, 1997
- Recorded: 1996
- Genre: Indie rock; noise pop; jangle pop
- Length: 3:07
- Label: Domino
- Songwriter: Stephen Malkmus

Pavement singles chronology
"Rattled by the Rush" (1995)	"Stereo" (1997)	"Shady Lane" (1997)

"Stereo" is a single by the band Pavement, taken from the album Brighten the Corners. It was released by Domino Records in 1997. The catalogue number for the single is RUG-051. It contains two B-sides: "Westie Can Drum" and "Winner of The." It was released at the same time as the 7" version of the single, which contains a different B-side. It is the first track on Matador's 10th Anniversary compilation. NME ranks the song as the 15th best song of 1997.

Some CDs contain the 7" B-side "Birds in the Majic Industry".

== Composition and lyrics ==
The song's lyrics make several references to pop culture icons.

- The repeated line "Hi-Ho Silver, Ride" in the chorus is a reference to The Lone Ranger's catchphrase.
- Part of the second verse muses about Rush lead singer Geddy Lee's distinctive high-pitched vocal stylings.

== Reception ==
The NME made the song single of the week, with Ted Kessler writing that "Malkmus is the most wry observer and accomplished wordsmith that nation [the United States] has spawned since Lou Reed" and that the song was "entirely ace."

== Track listing ==
All tracks are written by Stephen Malkmus.

No.	Title	Length
1.	"Stereo"	3:09
2.	"Westie Can Drum"	4:10
3.	"Winner Of The"	2:48
Total length:		10:07

=== Select pressings ===
No.	Title	Length
1.	"Birds In The Majic Industry"	3:08
2.	"Embassy Row"	3:52
