= Shady Lane =

Shady Lane EP/Single

EP by Pavement
- Released: June 10, 1997
- Recorded: 1996
- Studios: Piedmont Triad (Winston-Salem, North Carolina)
- Genre: Indie rock
- Length: 22:19
- Labels: Matador (US); Domino (UK)

Pavement chronology
Brighten the Corners (1997)	Shady Lane EP/Single (1997)	Terror Twilight (1999)

Professional ratings
Review scores
Source	Rating
AllMusic	2.5/5 stars
Christgau's Consumer Guide	A−
Entertainment Weekly	A−

"Shady Lane" is a song by American indie rock band Pavement that appears on the album Brighten the Corners. It was also released as a two-part single and as an EP, which collects the B-sides from both the British singles. The single was accompanied by a video directed by Spike Jonze. "Shady Lane" would become a top 40 hit in the UK for the band.

== Background and recording ==
The EP was released June 10, 1997, on Matador Records. It collects all the B-sides from the two "Shady Lane" UK singles. "Shady Lane (krossfader)" is a very similar version to the one on the album Brighten the Corners; the gap between the first chorus and second verse is shortened and the extended instrumental part towards the end (identified on the album as J vs. S) is omitted. The song "Slowly Typed" can also be found on Brighten the Corners, where it is named "Type Slowly". The version here is quite different, faster and more lo-fi with a country touch.

== Track listing ==
=== Part 1 – Shady Lane/Slow Typed ===
All tracks are written by Stephen Malkmus.

No.	Title	Length
1.	"Shady Lane (Krossfader)"	2:33
2.	"Slowly Typed"	2:52
3.	"Cherry Area"	1:32
Total length:		6:57

=== Part 2 – Shady Lane/Wanna Mess You Around ===
No.	Title	Length
1.	"Shady Lane (Krossfader)"	2:34
2.	"Wanna Mess You Around"	1:27
3.	"No Tan Lines"	3:01
Total length:		7:02

=== 7-inch – Shady Lane/Unseen Power of the Picket Fence ===
No.	Title	Length
1.	"Shady Lane"	2:33
2.	"Unseen Power Of The Picket Fence"	3:54
Total length:		6:45

=== EP ===
No.	Title	Length
1.	"Shady Lane (Krossfader)"	2:34
2.	"Slowly Typed"	2:52
3.	"Cherry Area"	1:32
4.	"Wanna Mess You Around"	1:26
5.	"No Tan Lines"	3:01
