= Slow Century =

- DVD Cover
- Directed by: Lance Bangs, Kim Gordon, Spike Jonze, Dan Koretzky, Thurston Moore, Tom Surgel
- Produced by: Lance Bangs
- Starring: Stephen Malkmus, Mark Ibold, Scott Kannberg, Bob Nastanovich, Steve West, Gary Young, Thurston Moore
- Music by: Pavement
- Distributed by: Matador Records (US); Domino Recording Company (UK)
- Release date: October 22, 2002
- Running time: 6 hours total (two discs)
- Language: English

Slow Century is a two-disc DVD retrospective of the band Pavement filmed and compiled by filmmaker Lance Bangs. The first disc contains Slow Century itself, a 90-minute documentary with extensive interviews with the band members (as well as their friend Thurston Moore) and considerable live concert footage from across their career featuring throughout; indeed, the film concludes with the encore from their final live show, held in London in 1999. There is also a presentation subtitled Cinema Stars (written using a star symbol rather than the word "star") featuring all their videos, as well as alternate and rejected clips for three songs. Interspersed throughout are brief clips from home movies, television appearances and behind-the-scenes footage. The second disc is entirely composed of live footage with a full concert from Seattle, Washington (July 1999) and edited highlights from the group's second last show in Manchester (11/1999). Across the two discs, there is a total of six hours of footage. There is band member and director commentary on each video and multiple angles on the second disc, and it is presented in Dolby stereo.

Directed by Lance Bangs, except:

- Kim Gordon (directed "Perfume-V" video)
- Thurston Moore (directed "Here" video)
- Dan Koretzky (directed "Cut Your Hair" video, co-directed the "Painted Soldiers" video)
- Rian Murphy (co-directed "Painted Soldiers" video)
- Scott Blen (directed "Gold Soundz" and "Range Life" videos)
- Tom Surgall (directed "Rattled by the Rush" video)
- John Kelsey (directed "Father to a Sister of Thought" and "Stereo" videos)
- Spike Jonze (directed "Shady Lane" video)

== Track listing ==
1. Slow Century, a 90-minute documentary incorporating footage from 1989–99.
2. "Here" (video)
3. "Perfume-V" (video)
4. "Cut Your Hair" (video)
5. "Gold Soundz" (video)
6. "Range Life" (video)
7. "Rattled by the Rush" (video)
8. "Father to a Sister of Thought" (video)
9. "Painted Soldiers" (video)
10. "Stereo" (video)
11. "Shady Lane" (video)
12. "Carrot Rope" (video)
13. "Spit on a Stranger" (video)
14. "Major Leagues" (video)
15. "Major Leagues" (alternate video)
16. "Rattled by the Rush" (alternate video)
17. "Cut Your Hair" (alternate video)
18. "In the Mouth a Desert" (Live Seattle, WA, 1999-07-14)
19. "Speak See Remember" (Live Seattle, WA, 1999-07-14)
20. "Spit on a Stranger" (Live Seattle, WA, 1999-07-14)
21. "Date with Ikea" (Live Seattle, WA, 1999-07-14)
22. "The Hexx" (Live Seattle, WA, 1999-07-14)
23. "Box Elder" (Live Seattle, WA, 1999-07-14)
24. "Folk Jam" (Live Seattle, WA, 1999-07-14)
25. "Billie" (Live Seattle, WA, 1999-07-14)
26. "Major Leagues" (Live Seattle, WA, 1999-07-14)
27. "Shady Lane"(Live Seattle, WA, 1999-07-14)
28. "Cream of Gold" (Live Seattle, WA, 1999-07-14)
29. "Platform Blues" (Live Seattle, WA, 1999-07-14)
30. "We Dance" (Live Seattle, WA, 1999-07-14)
31. "Harness Your Hopes" (Live Seattle, WA, 1999-07-14)
32. "Stereo" (Live Seattle, WA, 1999-07-14)
33. "Gold Soundz"(Live Seattle, WA, 1999-07-14)
34. "The Killing Moon" (covering Echo & the Bunnymen) (Live Seattle, WA, 1999-07-14)
35. "Sinister Purpose"(Live Seattle, WA, 1999-07-14)
36. "Debris Slide" (Live Seattle, WA, 1999-07-14)
37. "Grounded" (Live Academy Manchester, UK, 1999-11-19)
38. "Unfair" (Live Academy Manchester, UK, 1999-11-19)
39. "Two States" (Live Academy Manchester, UK, 1999-11-19)
40. "Fin" (Live Academy Manchester, UK, 1999-11-19)
41. "Date with Ikea" (Live Academy Manchester, UK, 1999-11-19)
42. "Range Life" (Live Academy Manchester, UK, 1999-11-19)
43. "Summer Babe" (Live Academy Manchester, UK, 1999-11-19)
44. "Handcuffs" banter from last show (Live, Brixton Academy 1999-11-20) (hidden easter egg)
45. "Unseen Power of the Picket Fence" (live) (hidden easter egg)
46. "Conduit for Sale" (live) (hidden easter egg)

== Easter egg ==
- On disc one, highlight the letter "P" in "Pavement" on the menu screen and then press enter/OK to unlock some hidden performance footage.
