= Major Leagues (EP) =

Major Leagues EP

EP by Pavement
- Released: October 12, 1999
- Recorded: 1997–1999
- Studio: Vista St. Clair (Unknown location); Louder Than You Think Studios (Stockton, California)
- Genre: Indie rock; lo-fi
- Length: 22:41
- Label: Matador
- Producer: Stephen Malkmus; Gary Young; Nigel Godrich; Miti Adhikari

Pavement chronology
Terror Twilight (1999)	Major Leagues EP (1999)	Slanted and Enchanted: Luxe & Reduxe (2002)

Professional ratings
Review scores
Source	Rating
AllMusic	2.5/5 stars
Christgau's Consumer Guide	(neither)
Pitchfork	6.2/10

Major Leagues is the final EP by American indie rock band Pavement. It was released on October 12, 1999, on Matador Records. To date, it is their final release of original material excluding reissues.

== Background and style ==
The EP contains seven tracks: A radio edit of the Terror Twilight version of "Major Leagues." Two "Spiral Stairs" songs: "Your Time to Change," and "Stub Your Toe," which were recorded by Pavement's original drummer, Gary Young (lead singer Stephen Malkmus most likely did not attend these sessions due to his feud with Young). A demo of "Major Leagues" recorded alone by Malkmus. "Decouvert de Soleil," which features Stephen Malkmus switching back between English and French. The sound and instrumentation of the song is very similar to that of the "Major Leagues" demo, so it could be safe to assume that the singer recorded this track alone as well. (One CD version contains the information that both these songs were recorded "in vista st. clair by s.m.", Malkmus' alias). Covers of Echo & the Bunnymen's "The Killing Moon" and The Fall's "The Classical" from a 1997 BBC session. The latter is introduced as "an old family favorite."

== Track listing ==
All tracks are written by Stephen Malkmus except where noted.

No.	Title	Writer(s)	Original artist	Length
1.	"Major Leagues [edit]"			3:01
2.	"Your Time to Change"	Scott Kannberg		3:10
3.	"Stub Your Toe"	Kannberg		2:34
4.	"Major Leagues [demo version]"			3:07
5.	""Decouvert de Soleil"			2:07
6.	"The Killing Moon"	Will Sergeant, Ian McCulloch, Les Pattinson, Pete de Freitas	Echo & the Bunnymen	5:15
7.	"The Classical"	Mark E. Smith, Steve Hanley, Marc Riley, Craig Scanlon, Paul Hanley, Karl Burns	The Fall	3:26

== Personnel ==
=== Pavement ===
- Stephen Malkmus – lead vocals, guitar
- Scott Kannberg – lead vocals, guitar
- Mark Ibold – bass guitar
- Steve West – drums
- Bob Nastanovich – percussion, backing vocals

=== Additional musicians ===
- Gary Young – drums
