= Brighten the Corners =

1997 studio album by Pavement

Studio album by Pavement
- Released: February 11, 1997
- Recorded: July 15–30, 1996
- Studios: Drive-In (Winston-Salem, North Carolina)
- Genre: Indie rock
- Length: 46:10
- Label: Matador
- Producers: Pavement; Bryce Goggin; Mitch Easter

Pavement chronology
Pacific Trim (1996)	Brighten the Corners (1997)	Shady Lane (1997)

Pavement studio album chronology
Wowee Zowee (1995)	Brighten the Corners (1997)	Terror Twilight (1999)

Singles from Brighten the Corners
- 1. "Stereo" Released: January 27, 1997; 2. "Shady Lane" Released: June 10, 1997

Brighten the Corners is the fourth studio album by American indie rock band Pavement, released on February 11, 1997 by Matador Records. The album received very positive reviews from critics.

== Background and recording ==
Brighten the Corners was recorded at Mitch Easter's Drive-In Studio in Winston-Salem, North Carolina. According to singer and guitarist Stephen Malkmus, it was either Matador Records or Mary Timony from Helium who suggested that the band should record the album there.

Although Brighten the Corners was mostly produced by Pavement and Bryce Goggin, Easter worked with the band for roughly a week when Goggin left the studio.

The recording sessions involved extensive editing, and the band would often record several versions of the same song before deciding on a final take. The vocals were then recorded in New York separately.

The album title was in reference to "Brighten The Corner Where You Are", a gospel hymn written by Homer Rodeheaver in the early 1900s.

== Release ==
Brighten the Corners was released on February 11, 1997, by Matador Records. In 2008, Matador released Brighten the Corners: Nicene Creedence Edition, a compilation containing Brighten the Corners in its entirety, as well as B-sides and other rarities from the same era.

== Music ==
The music on Brighten the Corners has been characterized as "melodic but complex." According to Stephen Thomas Erlewine of AllMusic: "The record is calm, with none of the full-out blasts of noise that marked all of their previous releases." The track "Blue Hawaiian" has been described as a "sleazed-up organ-fest." Mallory O'Donnell of Stylus Magazine comments on the influence of King Crimson on "Transport Is Arranged", and adds that "Brighten the Corners' most pertinent addition to their music is the way in which textures and moods brush against each other so comfortably: brusque across languorous, abrasive slid alongside smooth. Complex coexistence triumphs over quirky collage, and the band reveals their debt to British progressive pop: 'Embassy Row' rocks out the music hall as hard as anything on the Kinks' Arthur, and 'Passat Dream' could be mistaken for the Stone Roses."

== Critical reception ==
Professional ratings
Review scores
Source	Rating
AllMusic	4/5 stars
Chicago Tribune	3.5/4 stars
Christgau's Consumer Guide	A
Entertainment Weekly	B
Los Angeles Times	3.5/4 stars
NME	6/10
Pitchfork	8.6/10
Rolling Stone	4/5 stars
The Rolling Stone Album Guide	5/5 stars
Spin	8/10

Brighten the Corners received very positive reviews from critics and was ranked No. 10 in The Village Voice's 1997 Pazz & Jop critics' poll. In the poll's accompanying essay, Robert Christgau referred to the album as one of his "favorite albums of the year, easy", alongside those by Yo La Tengo, Sleater-Kinney, and Arto Lindsay.

Stephen Thomas Erlewine of AllMusic gave the album four stars out of five, writing: "While the preponderance of slow songs and laid-back production makes the album more focused than Wowee Zowee, it doesn't have the rich diversity of its predecessor -- 'Type Slowly' comes closest to the grand, melancholic beauty of 'Grounded' -- but it remains a thoroughly compelling listen."

== Track listing ==
All tracks are written by Stephen Malkmus, except where noted.

No.	Title	Writer(s)	Length
1.	"Stereo"		3:07
2.	"Shady Lane / J vs. S"		3:50
3.	"Transport Is Arranged"		3:52
4.	"Date w/ IKEA"	Scott Kannberg	2:39
5.	"Old to Begin"		3:22
6.	"Type Slowly"		5:20
7.	"Embassy Row"		3:51
8.	"Blue Hawaiian"		3:33
9.	"We Are Underused"		4:12
10.	"Passat Dream"	Kannberg	3:51
11.	"Starlings of the Slipstream"		3:08
12.	"Fin" (Listed as "Infinite Spark" on non-US pressings)		5:24
Total length:			46:10

== Personnel ==
=== Pavement ===
- Stephen Malkmus – lead vocals, guitar
- Bob Nastanovich – percussion, backing vocals
- Scott Kannberg – lead vocals (tracks 4, 10), backing vocals, guitar
- Steve West – drums, percussion
- Mark Ibold – bass guitar

=== Technical ===
- Mitch Easter – engineer, mixing
- Bryce Goggin – engineer, mixing

== Charts ==
=== Weekly charts ===
Chart (1997)	Peak position
Australian Albums (ARIA)	64
New Zealand Albums (RMNZ)	50
Norwegian Albums (VG-lista)	38
Swedish Albums (Sverigetopplistan)	56
UK Albums (Official Charts)	27
Scottish Albums (Official Charts)	31
US Billboard 200	70
European Albums (Eurotipsheet)	91

=== Singles ===
Title	Year	Peak position
Title	Year	UK
"Stereo"	1997	48
"Shady Lane"	1997	40

== Certifications ==
Region	Certification	Certified units/sales
United Kingdom (BPI)	Silver	60,000^{‡}
^{‡} Sales+streaming figures based on certification alone.
