= Pavement (band) =

American indie rock band

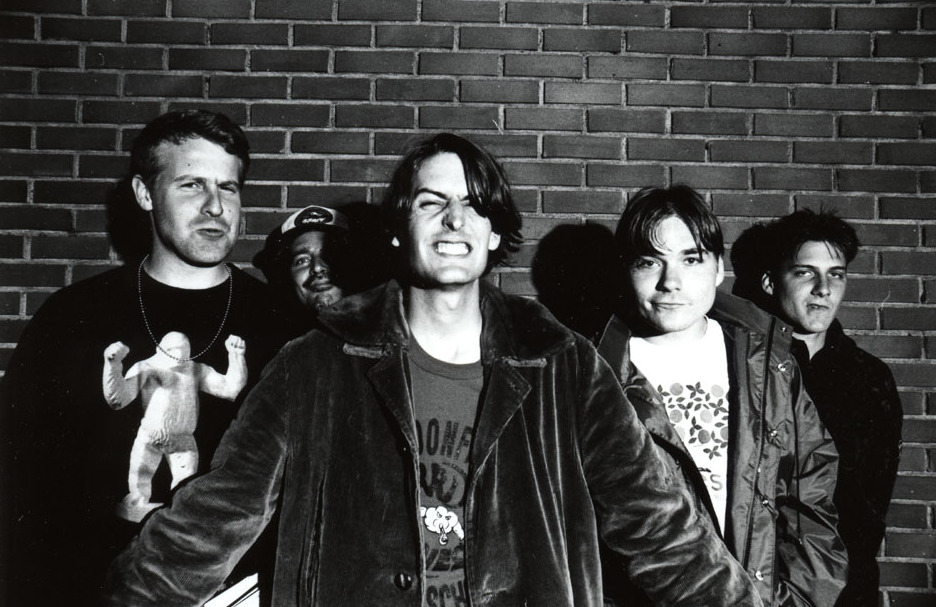
- Pavement in 1993. From left to right: Bob Nastanovich, Gary Young, Stephen Malkmus, Mark Ibold, and Scott Kannberg.

Background information
- Origin: Stockton, California, U.S.
- Genres: Indie rock; slacker rock; lo-fi; alternative rock; noise pop (early)
- Works: Discography
- Years active: 1989–1999; 2010; 2022–present
- Labels: Drag City; Matador; Big Cat; Pony Canyon; Domino; Flying Nun; Fellaheen
- Spinoffs: Preston School of Industry; Stephen Malkmus and the Jicks
- Spinoff of: Ectoslavia
- Members: Stephen Malkmus; Bob Nastanovich; Scott Kannberg; Steve West; Mark Ibold
- Past members: Gary Young; Jason Turner
- Website: pavementband.com

Pavement is an American indie rock band that formed in Stockton, California in 1989. For most of their career, the group consisted of vocalist and guitarist Stephen Malkmus, guitarist and vocalist Scott Kannberg, bassist Mark Ibold, drummer Steve West and vocalist and multi-instrumentalist Bob Nastanovich. Initially conceived as a recording project, the band at first avoided press or live performances, while attracting considerable underground attention with their early releases. Gradually evolving into a more polished band, Pavement recorded five full-length albums and ten EPs over the course of a decade, though the group disbanded with some acrimony in 1999 as the members moved on to other projects. In 2010, Pavement undertook a well-received reunion tour, followed by another international tour from 2022 to 2024. The band has played several smaller tours and concerts since then.

Though only briefly attracting mainstream attention with the single "Cut Your Hair" in 1994, Pavement were a successful indie rock band. Rather than signing with a major label as many of their 1980s forebears had done, they remained signed to independent labels throughout their career, including Flying Nun and Matador. Pavement achieved a cult following and have often been described as one of the most influential bands to emerge from the American underground in the 1990s. Some prominent music critics, such as Robert Christgau and Stephen Thomas Erlewine, called them the best band of the 1990s.

== History ==
=== 1987–1992: Formation and Slanted and Enchanted ===
Pavement officially formed in Stockton, California, in January 1989 as a studio project of guitarists and vocalists Stephen Malkmus and Scott Kannberg, known originally only as "S.M." and "Spiral Stairs". Kannberg had previously started a band of the same name and played one show in 1987 before quickly disbanding. The group's debut EPs were the lo-fi releases Slay Tracks: 1933–1969, Demolition Plot J-7, and Perfect Sound Forever. They were recorded at Louder Than You Think, the home studio of Stockton local and former hippie Gary Young, who also played drums on the recordings. Upon first hearing the duo's songs, Young was quoted as saying, "this Malkmus idiot is a complete songwriting genius".

During this time the band were often compared to English rock band the Fall. Kannberg stated in a 1992 interview that he preferred Minneapolis rock band the Replacements. The Fall singer Mark E. Smith claimed that Pavement were a "rip-off" and that they did not "have an original idea in their heads"; other members of the Fall have been more positive.

After the release of Slay Tracks, a new drummer, Jason Turner, was drafted to replace Young. However, after just one tour and a handful of recording sessions, when it became apparent that Turner and Malkmus did not get along, Young was reinstated. Malkmus later described Turner as "this depressed guy who might assassinate me one day... He's very competitive." Around the same time, Bob Nastanovich was incorporated into the live Pavement band as an auxiliary percussionist. Malkmus had been roommates with Nastanovich in New York City.

Pavement's first performance was on December 14, 1989, on their local college radio station KDVS-FM in Davis, with Malkmus, Kannberg, and Turner. In 1990, Pavement embarked on their first tour, with a third guitarist, Rob Chamberlin, who left to join a band called Sugartime before Ibold joined the group.

British indie rock band the Wedding Present covered the Slay Tracks song "Box Elder" after their bassist discovered the album during a trip to the United States. As Pavement were still unknown at the time, people erroneously grew to believe that Pavement's original recording was the cover. The Wedding Present frontman David Gedge gave a Pavement EP to John Peel, who quickly became one of Pavement's biggest fans.

Around 1992, Pavement became a full-time band, with Malkmus, Kannberg, Young, Nastanovich, and bassist Mark Ibold, who had been one of the band's earliest fans. They played their first show at punk club The Court Tavern in New Brunswick, New Jersey. Their debut album, Slanted and Enchanted, was released commercially in 1992 after copies had been circulated on cassette tape for nearly a year. Though the percussive influence of the Fall was still pervasive, as was that of English post-punk band Swell Maps, many of the songs also exhibited a strong sense of melody. Since its release Slanted and Enchanted has appeared on many critics' best-of lists and is frequently cited as being among the most influential indie rock albums of the 1990s. It is listed on Rolling Stone's 500 Greatest Albums of All Time. Later the same year, the band released the EP Watery, Domestic.

=== 1993–1994: Crooked Rain, Crooked Rain ===
During the Slanted & Enchanted tour, Gary Young's behaviour became more eccentric; he would hand out cabbage and mashed potatoes to fans at the door of the venue, perform handstands, drunkenly fall off his drum stool, and run around the venue while the band was playing. The band only understood how severe Young's drinking problem was after Pavement's first few tours. Malkmus later told Tape Op, "We knew that he was like a hippie and kinda flaky, but we didn't know he had such a bad drinking problem. We found out on that tour, because he really got sick from being nervous... That's why I let Bob be in the band...'Keep the beat going if Gary passes out.'" In 1993, Malkmus unsuccessfully attempted to record some songs at Young's studio. He later said, "We kind of wanted to not record with him anymore, but we were too nice to fire people or even really talk about it... We tried to record there, but it wasn't sounding good and he didn't have his studio ready and he was also in a drinking funk."

At the conclusion of a 1993 tour of Australia, Japan, and Europe, the group held a meeting in a hotel room in Copenhagen. Malkmus, Kannberg, and Ibold remained silent while Nastanovich, Young's best friend at the time, argued with Young. Young agreed to leave the band. He was replaced by Steve West, who had been a fellow museum security guard at the Whitney Museum of American Art along with Malkmus and David Berman. West's debut performance was in 1993 at a Drag City festival in Chicago. Also that year, the band contributed to the AIDS-Benefit Album No Alternative produced by the Red Hot Organization with their song "Unseen Power of the Picket Fence".

Pavement's second album Crooked Rain, Crooked Rain was released in 1994. The record was more indebted to the classic rock tradition than their debut. The single "Cut Your Hair" was the most successful song, and briefly enjoyed airplay on alternative rock radio and MTV. Pavement performed the song on The Tonight Show with Jay Leno. Additionally, the video aired on "Career Day", a season five episode of Beavis and Butt-head, who termed it "buttwipe music" and also wanted the band to "try harder." The song was also featured briefly in the movie A Very Brady Sequel. Like its predecessor, the album received widespread acclaim, including being listed on Rolling Stone magazine's list of the 500 greatest albums of all time.

The lyrics from another single from the album, "Range Life", criticized alternative rock stars the Smashing Pumpkins and the Stone Temple Pilots. Malkmus has insisted over the years that the line is meant to be light-hearted and is sung from the point of view of the aging hippie character in the song. Later live versions of the track had Malkmus substituting "the Spice Girls", "Counting Crows", or others for "Stone Temple Pilots". In response, Smashing Pumpkins leader Billy Corgan threatened to drop his band from their slot headlining the 1994 Lollapalooza Festival if Pavement was allowed to play. Corgan and Malkmus traded barbs in the press for several years afterwards.

=== 1995–1997: Wowee Zowee and Brighten the Corners ===
The next album, Wowee Zowee, recorded in Memphis and released April 11, 1995, covered a wide range of styles including punk, country and balladry across its 18 tracks, which often avoided conventional song structures. On the Slow Century DVD, Malkmus attributed his odd choice of singles to his marijuana smoking, stating that "I was smoking a lot of grass back then but to me they sounded like hits." Although Malkmus has said in recent interviews that the album is the last "classic Pavement record", Kannberg has voiced regrets about Wowee Zowee. "We made some mistakes on that record... we were kind of pressured into putting out a record a little faster than we were ready to. I mean, I'm totally into the record. It's just if we had another six months to think about it, it would've been much different."

During the tour for the album, Nastanovich stated on the Slow Century DVD, the band would often not work out a setlist before shows, opting for drug and alcohol fueled jams over hit singles. Some of these shows were held during the 1995 Lollapalooza festival, where the incoherent performances received a hostile reaction from many audiences. Footage from Slow Century shows the band being pelted with mud and rocks. The band left the stage immediately and dubbed themselves "The Band That Ruined Lollapalooza".

Wowee Zowee was followed up by the EP Pacific Trim, which was recorded with only Malkmus and drummers Nastanovich and Steve West. Their studio time was originally reserved for a Silver Jews recording, but frontman David Berman walked out in frustration and the trio decided not to waste prepaid recording time.

Brighten the Corners, released in 1997 and produced by Mitch Easter, was a shorter, more conventional record than Wowee Zowee. Malkmus said on the Slow Century DVD that the album was an attempt to show audiences that Pavement had more mainstream and classic rock influences than it had previously portrayed. The album contained two of the band's best known singles in "Stereo" and "Shady Lane". It was the only Pavement album to include a lyric sheet except Slanted and Enchanted and sold better than its predecessors. Despite increased success, the band continued to fragment, with its members focusing more on other musical projects or on raising families.

=== 1998–2000: Terror Twilight and breakup ===
In 1998, Pavement began work on their final album, Terror Twilight. The band originally planned to self-produce Terror Twilight, renting out Jackpot! Studios in Portland, Oregon. The group stalled though, with Malkmus, Ibold, Nastanovich, and Jackpot! employee and future Jicks bassist Joanna Bolme usually opting to play Scrabble over getting any sort of work accomplished. Kannberg was especially frustrated over the sessions, particularly at Malkmus's refusal to include any of Kannberg's songs on the album. Fan favorite "For Sale: The Preston School of Industry" and one other song penned by Kannberg were briefly worked on during the sessions, but abandoned.

Nigel Godrich, known for his work with Radiohead and Beck, was hired to produce. He wanted to make an album that "stood up straighter" and would "reach people who were turned off by the beautiful sloppiness of other Pavement records". The group began work in Sonic Youth's studio in lower Manhattan, New York. Godrich found the studio limiting, so they moved to RPM Studios near Washington Square Park. According to Nastanovich, Godrich struggled with the band's casual approach, and called for more takes than they were used to. Though Nastanovich said Godrich took on a "substantial challenge" and "did a good job", he felt he only connected with Malkmus and disregarded the other band members; Nastanovich realized after several days that Godrich did not know his name. Kannberg was unhappy that Malkmus was not interested in working on songs Kannberg had written, and said it was the hardest Pavement record to make.

Pavement released one last EP, Major Leagues. It features three Malkmus songs, two original Spiral Stairs songs and two covers, "The Killing Moon" by Echo & the Bunnymen and "The Classical" by the Fall. Pavement embarked on a six-month world tour for Terror Twilight, during which time relationships within the group frayed, especially between Malkmus and the other members. After their show at the 1999 Coachella Festival, Malkmus told his bandmates he did not want to continue. During the final concert of the tour, at Brixton Academy in London on November 20, 1999, Malkmus had a pair of handcuffs attached to his microphone stand and told the audience: "These symbolize what it's like being in a band all these years." About two weeks later, a spokesperson for their record label told NME that Pavement had "retired for the foreseeable future".

In mid-2000, Malkmus called Kannberg and told him, "You need to change the website to say we aren't a band any more. People keep asking me if we're breaking up and you know we're not a band any more, right?" Kannberg told Malkmus that he needed to call the other members of the band to inform them that the band was finally breaking up, but Malkmus refused and Kannberg was left with the task of informing them. West said he had never received any call about the breakup from anyone in the band, and discovered that Pavement had dissolved via the internet. Nastanovich later said "there was too much exhaustion for heavy emotion".

=== 2010: First reunion and second hiatus ===
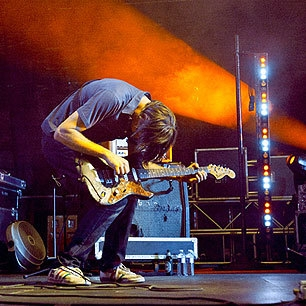
Stephen Malkmus in concert with Pavement in 2010

On September 15, 2009, Brooklyn Vegan reported that Pavement were scheduled to perform multiple benefit show dates in New York City's Central Park from September 21, 2010. Official statements by the band, label, venue and promoter were released on September 17, 2009, confirming the reunion. The announcement included one concert in Central Park and the promise of a tour, but said that the reunion may only be a one-off event. It said, "Please be advised this tour is not a prelude to additional jaunts and/or a permanent reunion." Tickets for the first Central Park concert sold out in two minutes, leading to the announcement of three more shows at the same venue. The band later confirmed a world-wide tour which started in Auckland, New Zealand, on March 1 at the Auckland Town Hall, before heading on to Australia then heading to the UK, including the All Tomorrow's Parties festival in Minehead, Somerset (May 14–16) and several European shows. They also performed at the Coachella Valley Music and Arts Festival in April 2010, the Sasquatch! and Primavera Sound Festivals in May, the Toronto Island Concert in June with Broken Social Scene, Band Of Horses, and others, Open'er Festival, Roskilde Festival and Les Ardentes and Pitchfork Music Festival in July.

The band released a "best-of" compilation album in March 2010, entitled Quarantine the Past: The Best of Pavement. On June 24, 2010, Pavement performed at the Bob Hope Theatre in Stockton, their first-ever hometown show. Original drummer Gary Young joined the band for an encore, playing three songs from Slanted and Enchanted. Young also joined the band during six songs the next night at The Greek Theater in Berkeley.

In September 2010, Pavement appeared on The Colbert Report and Late Night with Jimmy Fallon. After concluding their proper US tour at the Hollywood Bowl on September 30, the band played the following night in Las Vegas at the Palms Casino as a part of the Matador At 21 festival. During their set, Scott Kannberg kicked his monitor and smashed his guitar into his amp in frustration of not being able to hear himself while performing. NME noted the band had an "icy atmosphere onstage". The band honored a further two South American show commitments in November 2010.

Kannberg joined Malkmus and the Jicks onstage at the El Rey Theater in Los Angeles on March 28, 2014, for an encore performance of the Pavement song "Stereo". On October 1 and 2, 2016, Malkmus and the Jicks performed at Spiral Stairs' 50th birthday celebration at the Chapel in San Francisco. On the first night, Kannberg joined Malkmus and the Jicks for four songs. The following night, Kannberg played three more songs with the group, joined by Gary Young on the final two.

=== 2022–present: Second reunion ===
On June 1, 2019, Pavement announced that they would reunite to perform two 30th-anniversary shows at the 2020 Primavera Sound festivals in Barcelona and Porto. Due to the COVID-19 pandemic, the festival was rescheduled for June 2021. In March 2021, the festival was delayed to 2022. In September 2021, Pavement announced a European tour for late 2022, their first in 12 years, and announced a North American leg on November 2, 2021. On May 23, 2022, the band played their first show since 2010 for a sold-out crowd at the Fonda Theatre in Los Angeles. In June, the band at last performed at Primavera Sound 2022 in Barcelona and Porto, respectively.

For the tour, Pavement were joined by the keyboardist and backing vocalist Rebecca Cole, a former member of the Minders and Wild Flag. Nastanovich said Cole gave them more versatility and allowed them to play songs they had not performed live before.

Pavement did not rule out playing new songs live, but Malkmus said it would be "total cringe" to record new music.

The band began their North American tour at the Balboa Theatre on September 7, 2022, followed by concerts across 12 US states and Canada, ending at Austin City Limits, Texas on October 11. On October 17, the band began their European tour at the O2 Academy Leeds, England, which included touring the countries of England, Scotland, France, Denmark, Norway, Sweden, Germany, Belgium, Netherlands, and Ireland. The final European tour date took place at Vicar Street in Dublin, Ireland, on November 11.

The band then toured Japan, Australia, and New Zealand in the first quarter of 2023. While in Australia, the band appeared at the Mona Foma festival in Hobart alongside Bikini Kill, Angel Olsen and Jockstrap. The band then scheduled additional shows in Salt Lake City, Reykjavík, and Galway. That summer, the band was referenced in the film Barbie. Original drummer Gary Young died on August 17, 2023, at the age of 70. A documentary on Young's life, Louder Than You Think, had premiered earlier that year at SXSW.

The band performed their final show of the year at Smale Park in Cincinnati at the National's Homecoming festival on September 16, 2023. Kannberg and Malkmus hinted that it would be the band's last show for a while, but the band then announced a new performance at São Paulo's C6 Festival on May 19, 2024. In conjunction with the New York Film Festival premier of Pavements, a film about the band, Pavement played a one-off show on October 1, 2024, at New York City's Sony Hall, which Nastanovich said would be the band's "last show for a long time".

Malkmus' new supergroup, the Hard Quartet, released their self-titled debut album on October 4, 2024. While promoting the release, Malkmus noted that he would be open to recording a sixth Pavement album: "It did creep into my mind that actually, [an album] could be a possibility, but really, we just never got around to it [on the 2022-2024 reunion tour]. There's a classic reason too, that we'd want to get it right - like period-correct, those feelings. That being said, I'm not averse to it. You go around the world for a year and a half with these really nice guys that are your friends, and everyone was jacked about the whole thing." In December 2024, Scott Kannberg revealed that a new Pavement song will appear on the soundtrack album to Pavements, marking their first new material in over twenty-five years.

In 2026, it was announced that the band would undergo another brief reunion tour later that year, beginning on July 17, 2026 with a performance at the Mosswood Meltdown festival in Oakland, California. The tour is set to conclude on September 19, 2026 with a performance at the Shaky Knees Music Festival in Atlanta,Georgia.

== Musical style and influences ==
Freeing themselves from the pressure of trying to be something they weren't, the duo's early sound fizzed with raw elements that would soon come to enthral the local indie scene. Early tracks such as the spritely jog of the heartbroken Box Elder or the ominous, angular spikiness of She Believes revealed Malkmus and Kannberg's predilection for using their guitars as a diverse musical paintbrush. Complementing, and competing, with each other.

— Andy Price of Guitar.com (July 21, 2021)

Categorized as an indie rock band, Pavement were known for their "fractured" song structures and lo-fidelity production values. Heather Phares of AllMusic said, "Standing detached from the tumult of grunge, Pavement seemed laconic, sometimes lazy, as they threaded their love of underground American rock and British post-punk, dressing their winding melodies with squalls of feedback and shambolic rhythms." Pavement is credited for defining the modern "indie rock" sound and was a large presence in 1990s "slacker culture". Pavement's early releases were noted for their low fidelity. According to Jim Keoghan of The Quietus, the band exhibited "a raw, unpolished sound; one that seems to welcome dissonance and seeks to give the listener immediacy to the recording process."

Pavement was noted for their heavy use of heavy guitar distortion, and for having no designated rhythm and lead guitar player. Malkmus and Kannberg switched roles frequently although Malkmus played lead for the majority of their career. The band was also noted for their use of a foil, or a 'hype-man' usually present in hip hop groups. Bob Nastanovich filled the role although he has detested the term himself. Nastanovich also served as a second drummer during their live performances and served as lead vocalist on select songs that required screaming to prevent strain on Malkmus' voice.

The band is noted for its stream of consciousness lyrical style. Malkmus' humorous and often cryptic lyrical themes were a key factor in gaining their cult following. Malkmus rarely wrote ballads or love songs and only a small portion of their discography contained personal reflections or similar lyrical themes, and most were satirical or laced with sarcasm. Malkmus's vocal style in his work with Pavement was characterized as "half-sung, half-spoken".

Early in their career, Pavement were influenced by English post-punk band the Fall. Mark E. Smith, lead singer of the Fall, condemned Pavement as "rip-offs," and was quoted saying, "[they're] just the Fall in 1985, [aren't they]? They haven't got an original idea in their heads." Influences cited by Kannberg include the Replacements and Swell Maps.

The band has also listed Sonic Youth, Echo & the Bunnymen, and R.E.M. as direct influences. Pavement referenced R.E.M. in the song "Unseen Power of the Picket Fence" featured on the compilation No Alternative and covered "Camera" which appeared as a B-side on the single of "Cut Your Hair". They have also covered Echo & the Bunnymen's "The Killing Moon" on the Major Leagues EP.

== Other media ==
In 2002, Slow Century, a documentary by Lance Bangs coupled with all of the band's music videos, was released as a 2 DVD set. Included was extensive footage, both professionally shot and taped by fans on camcorders, from the band's earliest shows in 1989 forward. The three final songs from the band's final concert ("Stop Breathin'", "Conduit for Sale" and "Here") are presented at the end of the documentary. Also on the DVD is a hidden easter egg clip from the same show, wherein Malkmus talks about how the handcuffs attached to his microphone stand "represent what it's like being in a band all these years." A bonus disc with a complete concert in Seattle, Washington, from the early part of the Terror Twilight tour was included on the second disc, as well as several songs from their penultimate show.

2004 saw the publication of Perfect Sound Forever: The Story of Pavement, a biography on the band written by Rob Jovanovic. Reviews for the book were mixed, with some saying that it contained much of the same information as the Slow Century DVD and expanded very little on it, while others called it a "fond retrospection".

Slanted! Enchanted! A Pavement Musical, a play consisting of songs from the Pavement discography and following a Stephen Malkmus–like protagonist, opened with a limited run off-broadway in December 2022.

== Band members ==
=== Current lineup ===
- Stephen Malkmus – lead vocals, guitar (1989–1999, 2010, 2022–present)
- Scott Kannberg – guitar, backing and lead vocals (1989–1999, 2010, 2022–present), bass (1989–1991), keyboards (1994–1999)
- Mark Ibold – bass guitar, backing vocals (1991–1999, 2010, 2022–present)
- Bob Nastanovich – percussion, synthesizers, harmonica, slide whistle, backing and occasional lead vocals (1991–1999, 2010, 2022–present)
- Steve West – drums, percussion (1993–1999, 2010, 2022–present)

==== Current touring musicians ====
- Rebecca Cole – keyboards, percussion, backing vocals (2022–present)

=== Former members ===
- Gary Young – drums (1989, 1989–1993, 2010; died 2023)
- Jason Turner – drums (1989)

==== Former touring musicians ====
- Rob Chamberlin – guitar (1990)

== Discography ==
Studio albums

- Slanted and Enchanted (1992)
- Crooked Rain, Crooked Rain (1994)
- Wowee Zowee (1995)
- Brighten the Corners (1997)
- Terror Twilight (1999)

== Bibliography ==
- Jovanovic, Rob (2004). Perfect Sound Forever: The Story of Pavement. (Boston) Justin, Charles & Co. ISBN 1-932112-07-3.
