= Slay Tracks: 1933–1969 =

EP by Pavement
- Released: Summer 1989
- Recorded: January 17, 1989
- Studio: Louder Than You Think Studios (Stockton, California)
- Genres: Indie rock; lo-fi; noise pop
- Length: 14:02
- Label: Treble Kicker
- Producer: Gary Young

Pavement chronology
Slay Tracks: 1933–1969 (1989)	Demolition Plot J-7 (1990)

Slay Tracks: 1933–1969 (usually referred to as Slay Tracks) is the debut EP by American indie rock band Pavement.

Pavement was then a duo of founding members Stephen Malkmus (guitar, vocals) and Scott Kannberg (guitar). They recorded Slay Tracks during a four hour session with producer Gary Young who played drums on the EP and later joined the band. Pavement self-released the EP as a 7" vinyl record in 1989 on the band's own record label Treble Kicker.

The music of Slay Tracks was influenced by indie and punk rock bands such as Swell Maps and The Fall, and many of the lyrics were inspired by life in the band's hometown of Stockton, California.

Although only 1,000 copies of Slay Tracks were pressed, the EP became an underground hit. Upon release, the EP was critically praised by independently produced zines. The EP managed to generate buzz for Pavement in the UK after The Wedding Present's cover of the song "Box Elder" received some airplay from the famous BBC host radio John Peel. The release and relative success of Slay Tracks was significant to Pavement's subsequent signing to Drag City, and later to Matador Records. The band's Westing (By Musket and Sextant) (1993) compiled the songs from the band's three EPs prior to their debut album Slanted and Enchanted: Slay Tracks, Demolition Plot J-7, and Perfect Sound Forever. The compilation allowed those songs to reach a wider audience than the EP's limited initial release.

== Background ==
Pavement was formed in 1989 in Stockton, California, by Stephen Malkmus and Scott Kannberg. Malkmus and Kannberg had previously performed together in the band Bag O' Bones. Pavement had its start playing at open mic nights at clubs and bars. The songs the band played during this time were mostly covers, although they also performed many original songs that would later be released on Slay Tracks. Malkmus recalls, "It was pretty reasonable to be able to make a single for $1,000, so we decided to go for it. We didn't have any real plans because we weren't a real band." Two local studios existed in Stockton, the cheaper and less professionally minded of which was Gary Young's Louder Than You Think Studio. The band decided to record at Young's studio due to their admiration of other local punk bands who had recorded there, including The Young Pioneers and The Authorities. Kannberg reportedly borrowed $800 from his father to record Slay Tracks.

== Recording ==
Slay Tracks was recorded during a four-hour session on January 17, 1989, at Young's studio. Kannberg, describing the studio and the recording process, said, "You go into his house and it's stuff everywhere, old dogs lying around, big pot plants everywhere, and Gary tells us that he got all his equipment by selling pot! It was us going in and pretty much just laying down the songs with a guide guitar and a detuned guitar through a bass amp and then we'd play drums over the top." Young, though bewildered by the band's sound, contributed by playing drums. He recalled, "[Malkmus and Kannberg] come in and they play this weird guitar noise and it just sounds like noise, with no background. My drums were in there so I said, 'Should I drum?' and they said 'Okay.'" Kannberg said, "We did it really fast. We probably spent one day tracking and one day mixing it." The title of the EP had been decided prior to its recording, and the pseudonyms S.M. and Spiral Stairs were used to credit Malkmus and Kannberg respectively.

== Composition and lyrics ==
"You're Killing Me"
"You're Killing Me", the opening track on Slay Tracks, is absent of percussion or drums and contains fuzz guitar effects.

"Box Elder"
"Box Elder", the EP's second track, is more influenced by pop music than the rest of the songs on Slay Tracks.

Most of the music on Slay Tracks was written by Malkmus, but the music to "Box Elder" was written by Kannberg. Malkmus stated his influences on the record included Chrome, Swell Maps, and The Fall. The songs on the EP drew comparisons to the likes of R.E.M., Pixies, and Sonic Youth by Stephen Thomas Erlewine and Heather Phares of AllMusic (which, like all of the World Wide Web, did not exist when the EP was released). Radio static and noise are prominently used on the EP, techniques which are characteristic of the lo-fi and noise pop genres that Pavement are frequently associated with. According to Malkmus, "We decided to use static as the third instrument ... It was pretty exciting to be so experimental." Young played drums on "Box Elder" and "Price Yeah!", and frequently improvised. Malkmus played drums on "Maybe Maybe", while both Malkmus and Kannberg drummed on "She Believes". Andy Price of Guitar.com described the EP's song structures as "organically shifting between furious squalls of guitar, and shaky arrangements that were barely able to stand, before decaying into abstract expressions of fury." He described Malkmus' vocal performance on the EP as "veer[ing] from a sardonic, idle cool, to a hormonal wail."

"You're Killing Me", the longest song on the EP at three minutes and 20 seconds, is an example of the impact punk rock had on Pavement. The song features fuzz effects, repetitive lyrics, and no percussion or drums. "Box Elder", an ironic song about someone wanting to move to Box Elder, Montana, was considered by Gerard Cosloy to be an example of Malkmus's "honest, direct, and simplistic" lyrical style, and features greater influence from pop music than the rest of the EP. "Maybe Maybe" features distorted guitars and indiscernible vocals, and "Price Yeah!" has a sound typical of hardcore punk. The band's hometown of Stockton inspired the band's lyrics and sound. "There's something empty about Stockton," Malkmus said. "I wanted to convey that in our music." He told Melody Maker, "Pavement was originally a pathetic effort by us to do something to escape the terminal boredom we were experiencing in Stockton."

== Release ==
After recording was complete, Kannberg was tasked with releasing the music himself, as Malkmus had departed on a trip to parts of Europe, North Africa, and the Middle East. Kannberg designed the cover of the EP and sent copies to various independent labels, distributors, and zines. He recalled, "I had no idea how to do it. I'd send off these little notes to my favorite labels like SST and Twin Tone and ask, 'How do I do this?'" A representative from SST recommended that Kannberg use Erica Records, a Los Angeles 7" manufacturer. Kannberg chose Erica Records to manufacture Slay Tracks but was unhappy with the master recording produced by the company: "It sounds like it sounds now—it's just a mess—but being poor and not really caring I said, 'Okay, that's cool, if it sounds like that–whatever.'" Slay Tracks was pressed in a limited run of 1,000 copies, with a green dinosaur stamp on the label of the first 50 copies. The EP was distributed in the United States and England through Kannberg's own Treble Kicker Records, though Malkmus soon came across a copy in a record store while visiting Austria.

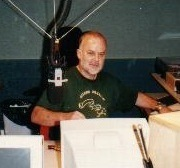
English DJ John Peel helped to promote Slay Tracks with his radio program.

Slay Tracks found unexpected attention after The Wedding Present, an English band, covered "Box Elder" on their own 1990 EP, Brassneck. The Wedding Present's bassist Keith Gregory had been introduced to Slay Tracks by future Pavement bassist Mark Ibold while visiting New York City. The cover differs from the original in that the line "that I had to get the fuck out of this town" was changed to "that I had to get right out of this town". The cover version received radio airplay from influential English disc jockey John Peel, generating publicity for both the Wedding Present and Pavement. Pavement had not been asked permission or informed of the cover until after it was already on UK radio. Kannberg said he initially felt "offended", but his opinion of the cover and its significance later changed: "It was so cool that some band from the UK wanted to cover this obscure, horribly recorded song. At the time I probably never appreciated the full extent of how them covering the song helped Pavement, especially in the UK, but it really did, and I'll always be grateful to them for that."

Shortly after its release, Slay Tracks became a collector's item. According to an April 1990 Drag City press release, copies were typically sold for $500–$600. Malkmus and Kannberg each kept 100 copies of the EP, and Malkmus said "I used to sell them for fifty dollars. When I needed money I'd go in and sell a couple to the store and they'd sell for a hundred dollars each. I rarely meet anyone who bought it when it originally came out." Malkmus also said that the pair "probably gave away about one-hundred to friends and bands we later toured with." The songs on Slay Tracks found airplay on several college radio stations, including WTJU at the University of Virginia and KALX at the University of California, Berkeley. The band had not anticipated the EP's relative degree of success; Kannberg later said "[i]t was very surprising to find that people were into [Slay Tracks]."

== Reception ==
Slay Tracks received generally positive reviews. Much of the initial critical reception to Slay Tracks was from zines to whom Kannberg had sent the EP. A review in the San Francisco-based zine Maximum RocknRoll said "Most of the tunes work by virtue of their eclecticism, freshness, and originality—this is a good one." The zine Conflict called the EP "absolutely perfect." Slay Tracks also received attention from mainstream publications. Robert Christgau of the Village Voice rated Slay Tracks an A−, and selected it as his fourth favorite EP of 1990. Spin's review said: "a long stream of noise water is omitted by Pavement. ... What a party!" A reviewer for Option praised the band's lo-fi characteristics and attitude, calling the EP "loose and intentionally lo-fi," and saying "let's hope this Pavement stays cracked." College Music Journal's review was also favorable, noting "You're Killing Me" and "She Believes" as highlights, and calling the EP a "deep, intoxicating breath of homemade music from people with tongues in their cheeks and hearts on their sleeves ... the twin engine feedback and fuzz hits dead center with naive [sic] melodic balance, and whether that is in spite of or because of the sloppy, one-take feel is inconsequential."

== Legacy ==
Young's drum performance on Slay Tracks eventually led to him joining Pavement as a full-time member. Young produced the group's 1990 EP Demolition Plot J-7, but displayed hostility toward then-current drummer Jason Fawkes. Fawkes left Pavement in 1991 due to animosity with Malkmus, allowing Young to drum on their third EP, Perfect Sound Forever. Young drummed on all Pavement releases from then on until 1992's Watery, Domestic, after which he was fired for his increasingly erratic behavior and was replaced with Steve West. Young's drumming on Slay Tracks was later recognized as an important turning point in Pavement's history, and was considered to be "the opportunity of a lifetime" by C. Harris-Nystrom of the News & Review.

Dan Koretzky, founder of Drag City, ordered 200 copies of the EP for the Chicago Reckless Records store he worked for at the time. Koretzky asked Kannberg if he would sign to Drag City during the same phone call that he ordered the EP. Kannberg remembered expressing reluctance to sign to any label, but Drag City producer and session musician Rian Murphy recalled that "We asked, they said yes. Lives didn't seem to be on the line." Chris Lombardi and Gerard Cosloy of Matador Records also first heard of Pavement after Kannberg sent a copy of Slay Tracks to their zine, Conflict. Matador signed Pavement in 1992 for the release of their debut studio album, Slanted and Enchanted. Pavement returned to Peel's show the same year and, in a cover of Silver Jews' "Secret Knowledge of Backroads", Malkmus ad-libbed the line, "It's not as good as the first EP"—an ambiguous reference to either Slay Tracks or the Silver Jews' early recordings, on which he had appeared.

The songs on Slay Tracks are all included on the 1993 compilation Westing (By Musket and Sextant), along with several of Pavement's other early material. Westing has sold 63,000 copies, and was praised by Robert Christgau and Stephen Thomas Erlewine for making songs previously found exclusively on vinyl available on compact disc. All of the songs from Slay Tracks were played live throughout Pavement's history, with "Box Elder" particularly cited as an "old favorite" for fans at concerts. Live performances of "Box Elder" has also been included on the compilation reissues Slanted and Enchanted: Luxe & Reduxe and Wowee Zowee: Sordid Sentinels Edition, with the version on the latter beginning with a short jam session. In a 1999 retrospective of the band's career, Donna Freydkin of CNN.com called Slay Tracks "a quick underground favorite", while John Hicks of the Planet Weekly wrote "Although Pavement was conceived as a studio-only project, the underground success of Slay Tracks ensured that it was only a matter of time before the group became a full-fledged performing entity."

== Track listing ==
All tracks are written by Stephen Malkmus and Scott Kannberg.

No.	Title	Length
1.	"You're Killing Me"	3:20
2.	"Box Elder"	2:26
3.	"Maybe Maybe"	2:14
4.	"She Believes"	3:20
5.	"Price Yeah!"	3:00
Total length:		14:20

== Personnel ==
=== Pavement ===
- Stephen Malkmus – lead vocals (tracks 1–5), guitar (tracks 1–2, 4–5), keyboard (track 1), synthesizer (track 5), drums (tracks 3–4), bass guitar (track 2)
- Scott Kannberg – guitar (tracks 1–5), drums (tracks 3–4), trombone (track 4)
- Gary Young – drums (tracks 2, 5)

=== Additional musicians ===
- Jeff Doyle – drums (track 4)
- Kelly Hensley – drums (track 4)
