= Westing (By Musket and Sextant) =

Compilation album by Pavement
- Released: March 22, 1993
- Recorded: 1989–1993
- Genre: Indie rock, lo-fi
- Length: 48:23
- Label: Drag City; Big Cat; Domino; Flying Nun
- Producer: Gary Young; Pavement

Pavement chronology
Watery, Domestic (1992)	Westing (By Musket and Sextant) (1993)	Crooked Rain, Crooked Rain (1994)

Professional ratings
Review scores
Source	Rating
Allmusic	4/5 stars
Christgau's Consumer Guide	A−
The New Rolling Stone Album Guide	4/5 stars
Rolling Stone	3.5/5 stars
Spin	1/1 star

Westing (By Musket and Sextant) is a compilation of the early EPs and singles by American indie rock band Pavement. It features all the tracks from their first three EPs, Slay Tracks (1933–1969), Demolition Plot J-7, and Perfect Sound Forever, as well as the single mix of "Summer Babe," its B-sides, and two compilation tracks.

== Track listing ==
All tracks are written by Stephen Malkmus and Scott Kannberg.

Slay Tracks: 1933–1969
1. "You're Killing Me" – 3:20
2. "Box Elder" – 2:26
3. "Maybe Maybe" – 2:14
4. "She Believes" – 3:02
5. "Price Yeah!" – 3:00
Demolition Plot J-7
6. "Forklift" – 3:27
7. "Spizzle Trunk" – 1:23
8. "Recorder Grot" – 2:08
9. "Internal K-Dart" – 1:51
10. "Perfect Depth" – 2:43
11. "Recorder Grot (Rally)" – 0:21
Perfect Sound Forever
12. "Heckler Spray" – 1:06
13. "From Now On" – 2:03
14. "Angel Carver Blues/Mellow Jazz Docent" – 2:30
15. "Drive-by Fader" – 0:28
16. "Debris Slide" – 1:56
17. "Home" – 2:23
18. "Krell Vid-User" – 1:26
Summer Babe single
19. "Summer Babe" – 3:13
20. "Mercy Snack: The Laundromat" – 1:39
21. "Baptist Blacktick" – 2:03
Compilation appearances
22. "My First Mine" – 2:20
23. "My Radio" – 1:21

== Personnel ==
=== Pavement ===
- Stephen Malkmus – lead vocals (tracks 1–14, 16–23), guitar (tracks 1–23), keyboard (tracks 1,6, 9), synthesizer (tracks 5, 9), bass guitar (track 2), percussion (tracks 3,6)
- Scott Kannberg – guitar (tracks 2–14, 16–23), bass guitar (tracks 12–14, 16–18), drums (tracks 3–4), trombone (track 4), keyboard (track 7), synthesizer (track 9)
- Gary Young – drums (tracks 2, 4–5, 12–14, 16–23)

== Charts ==
Chart (1992/1993)	Peak position
Australian Albums (ARIA)	171
United Kingdom Albums (OOC)	30
