= Cut Your Hair =

Single by Pavement

from the album Crooked Rain, Crooked Rain
- B-side: "Camera"; "Stare"
- Released: February 1994 (USA)
- Recorded: August–September 1993
- Studio: Random Falls Studio (New York City, New York)
- Genre: Indie rock; alternative rock
- Length: 3:09
- Label: Matador
- Songwriter: Stephen Malkmus
- Producer: Pavement

Pavement singles chronology
"Trigger Cut" (1992)	"Cut Your Hair" (1994)	"Gold Soundz" (1994)

"Cut Your Hair" is a song by American rock band Pavement from their second album, Crooked Rain, Crooked Rain. It was written by Pavement songwriter and lead singer Stephen Malkmus. The song snidely attacks the importance of image in the music industry. In one verse, Malkmus sarcastically recites a fictitious ad looking for a musician to join a band: "advertising looks and chops a must/ no big hair".

The song was released as a single and became the band's best-selling song. "Cut Your Hair" reached the top ten on Billboard's Alternative Songs chart in the spring of 1994, spending 12 weeks on the Alternative Billboard chart.

Both B-sides are included on the reissue Crooked Rain, Crooked Rain: LA's Desert Origins. The unlisted B-side track on the 12" version of the single is an instrumental recording of "Rain Ammunition," and has never been reissued.

In May 2007, NME magazine placed "Cut Your Hair" at number 28 in its list of the 50 Greatest Indie Anthems Ever.

== Track listing ==
1. "Cut Your Hair"
2. "Camera" (R.E.M. cover)
3. "Stare"
4. "Rain Ammunition (instrumental)" (hidden track on 12")

== Music video ==
The video, released in 1994, is relatively simple, showing the band sitting on a bench at a barber shop, waiting to get their hair cut. Some strange things happen to each band member when they go and sit on the barber's chair:

- Mark Ibold - He shakes his head to mess up his hair and then sneezes. The viewer finds out that he sneezed out a cat. He then gives it to the barber and goes back to the bench.
- Scott Kannberg - He comes up to the barber's chair dressed in a clothed gorilla suit and gets his hair cut. He is then seen back in human form, and he goes back to the bench.
- Bob Nastanovich - When he gets up, he trips over the table of magazines in front of the bench. He tries to drink something out of a flask, and then attempts to drink the barber's Barbicide cleaning solution but the barber will not let him.
- Stephen Malkmus - The barber gives him a platter, a king's scepter, a martini, and a paper crown. The audience sees a closeup of him with a tear rolling down his cheek.
- Steve West - He asks the barber to cut his hair. Just as he is about to do so, West is suddenly wearing a frog costume. The barber shakes his head, refusing to give him a haircut.

Each band member has different clothes on when they go back to the bench. After their haircuts, all the band members leave the barbershop very quickly, with Ibold taking a magazine he had been reading.

In an alternate version of the video, a black-and-white TV in the barber shop played a loop of the band acting silly in Malkmus' apartment.

== Soundtrack appearances ==
"Cut Your Hair" was featured on the soundtrack to Jackass: Number Two, A Very Brady Sequel, The Ultimate Playlist of Noise, The To Do List, and You, Me and Dupree. It is available as a downloadable track for Guitar Hero 5.

== Other versions ==
- In 2010, American rock band Motion City Soundtrack covered the song for the first season of The A.V. Club's A.V. Undercover web series.
- In 2023, American pop-punk band Midtown covered the song for their We're Too Old To Write New Songs So Here's Some Songs We Didn't Write EP.

== Chart performance ==
Chart (1994)	Peak position
Australia (ARIA)	188
UK Singles (Official Charts)	52
US Alternative Airplay (Billboard)	10
