= Crooked Rain, Crooked Rain: LA's Desert Origins =

Compilation album by Pavement
- Released: October 26, 2004
- Recorded: Early 1993 – February 26, 1994
- Genre: Indie rock
- Length: 158:01
- Label: Matador, Domino

Pavement chronology
Slanted and Enchanted: Luxe & Reduxe (2002)	Crooked Rain, Crooked Rain: LA's Desert Origins (2004)	Wowee Zowee: Sordid Sentinels Edition (2006)

Crooked Rain, Crooked Rain: LA's Desert Origins is a compilation album by Pavement released on October 26, 2004. It contains the band's 1994 album, Crooked Rain, Crooked Rain, in its entirety, as well as outtakes and other rarities from that era, some of which had previously been unreleased.

== Release ==
LA's Desert Origins was released on October 26, 2004, by Matador Records. The album contains a 62-page booklet of liner notes, which contain photographs, artwork, accounts from vocalist/guitarist Stephen Malkmus and guitarist Scott Kannberg (a.k.a. "Spiral Stairs"), and notes Malkmus wrote for Melody Maker about each of the songs on the original album. The liner notes also feature a surreal and sensationalistic "interview" between Matador's Gerard Cosloy and the fictitious "Rob Jurkface". According to Cosloy, he took questions by Pavement's biographer, Rob Jovanovic, changed them slightly, and wrote silly answers for them.

Some of the songs on the second disc ("Flux = Rad", "Kennel District", "Grounded" and "Pueblo") are early forms of songs on 1995's Wowee Zowee.

Shortly after its release, a Matador employee posted corrected info regarding the recording sessions for the previously unreleased tracks on disc two: Only tracks 2 through 8 feature Gary Young on drums. Tracks 13 through 21 were recorded at Gary Young's studio in Stockton, though Gary does not play on them; any drums were played by Spiral Stairs. A further mistake is found in the track-listing on the back of the CD; "Silence Kid" is listed as "Silence Kit", despite the interior artwork showing the correct name in print several times, including written in Stephen Malkmus's own handwriting. Some have pointed out that on Pavement's 2010 tour the song appeared on their set-list as "Silence Kit" (Set list), although it is not clear who typed the list, or if it was done as a joke.

== Critical reception ==
Professional ratings
Review scores
Source	Rating
The Austin Chronicle	4/5 stars
Blender	5/5 stars
Christgau's Consumer Guide	(3-star Honorable Mention)
Cokemachineglow	96%
Entertainment Weekly	B+
Pitchfork	10/10
Rolling Stone	5/5 stars
Spin	A+
Tom Hull	A−

LA's Desert Origins received very positive reviews from critics with Spin highlighting the consistency of the extra tracks.

== Track listing ==
=== Disc One: "Back to the Gold Soundz (Phantom Power Parables)" ===
Crooked Rain, Crooked Rain
1. "Silence Kid" – 3:00
2. "Elevate Me Later" – 2:51
3. "Stop Breathin'" – 4:27
4. "Cut Your Hair" – 3:06
5. "Newark Wilder" – 3:53
6. "Unfair" – 2:33
7. "Gold Soundz" – 2:39
8. "5 - 4 = Unity" – 2:09
9. "Range Life" – 4:54
10. "Heaven Is a Truck" – 2:30
11. "Hit the Plane Down" – 3:36
12. "Fillmore Jive" – 6:38
"Cut Your Hair" single
13. "Camera" – 3:45 (R.E.M. Cover)
14. "Stare" – 2:51
"Range Life" single
15. "Raft" – 3:34
16. "Coolin' by Sound" – 2:50
"Gold Soundz" single
17. "Kneeling Bus" – 1:33
18. "Strings of Nashville" – 3:46
19. "Exit Theory" – 1:00
Gold Soundz Austral-N.Z. French Micronesia 94 Tour EP
20. "5 - 4 Vocal" – 2:08
Crooked Rain, Crooked Rain bonus 7"
21. "Jam Kids" – 4:54
22. "Haunt You Down" – 4:51
No Alternative compilation
23. "Unseen Power of the Picket Fence" – 3:51
Hey Drag City! compilation
24. "Nail Clinic" – 2:25

=== Disc Two: "After the Glow (Where Eagles Dare)" ===
Recorded in early 1993 at Louder Than You Think in Stockton, California
1. "All My Friends" – 5:12
2. "Soiled Little Filly" – 2:08
3. "Range Life" – 4:11
4. "Stop Breathing" – 3:54
5. "Ell Ess Two" (a.k.a. "Loretta's Scars II", later renamed to "Elevate Me Later") – 2:44
6. "Flux = Rad" – 2:11
7. "Bad Version of War" – 3:27
8. "Same Way of Saying" – 4:35
Recorded in August and September 1993 at Random Falls in New York City
9. "Hands Off the Bayou" – 2:43
10. "Heaven is a Truck (Egg Shell)" – 2:20
11. "Grounded" – 3:35
12. "Kennel District" – 3:24
13. "Pueblo (Beach Boys)" – 3:47
14. "Fucking Righteous" – 2:47
15. "Colorado" – 1:13
16. "Dark Ages" – 2:39
17. "Flood Victim" – 1:17
18. "JMC Retro" – 0:52
19. "Rug Rat" – 3:05
20. "Strings of Nashville (Instrumental)" – 3:50
21. "Instrumental" – 3:40
John Peel Session (Transmitted February 26, 1994)
22. "Brink of the Clouds" – 3:48
23. "Tartar Martyr" – 3:13
24. "Pueblo Domain" – 4:18
25. "The Sutcliffe Catering Song" – 3:22

== Personnel ==
- Gail Butensky – photography
- Bryce Goggin – piano, mixing
- Alex Kirzhner – design
- Mark Ohe – art direction
- Mark Venezia – engineer
