= Crooked Rain, Crooked Rain =

Studio album by Pavement
- Released: February 14, 1994
- Recorded: August–September 1993
- Studios: Random Falls (New York City); Louder Than You Think (Stockton, California)
- Genres: Indie rock; alternative rock; folk rock; psychedelic rock; slacker rock
- Length: 42:16
- Label: Matador
- Producer: Pavement

Pavement chronology
Westing (By Musket and Sextant) (1993)	Crooked Rain, Crooked Rain (1994)	Wowee Zowee (1995)

Pavement studio album chronology
Slanted and Enchanted (1992)	Crooked Rain, Crooked Rain (1994)	Wowee Zowee (1995)

Singles from Crooked Rain, Crooked Rain
- 1. "Cut Your Hair" Released: February 1994; 2. "Gold Soundz" Released: June 1994; 3. "Range Life" Released: January 1995

Crooked Rain, Crooked Rain is the second studio album by American indie rock band Pavement, released on February 14, 1994 by Matador Records. The album saw the band move on towards a more accessible rock sound than that of their more lo-fi debut Slanted and Enchanted and achieve moderate success with the single "Cut Your Hair". The album also saw original drummer Gary Young replaced by Steve West. It was a UK Top 20 hit upon release, although it was not so successful in the US charts.

== Music and lyrics ==
The music on Crooked Rain has been characterized as "graft[ing] a shadow history of '60s and '70s California folk-rock and psychedelia onto the abrasive, Fall-inspired noise of their previous sound." According to Elizabeth Nelson of Pitchfork, the album's tracks "are alternately sparkling and insinuating, mournful and ominous and finally cathartic, variously evoking the desert swoon of the Flying Burrito Brothers, the swaggering two-guitar overdrive of Buffalo Springfield, and the eerie chill of jazz pioneer Dave Brubeck."

Stephen Thomas Erlewine of AllMusic wrote, "Crooked Rain strips away the hiss and fog of [Slanted], removing some of Pavement's mystery yet retaining their fractured sound and spirit. It's filled with loose ends and ragged transitions, but compared to the fuzzy, dense Slanted, Crooked Rain is direct and immediately engaging." The album makes use of guitar feedback, as well as fuzz and wah guitar effects. The album contains elements of pop music. The album also incorporates elements of country rock, making use of cowbells. Richard Cromelin of the Los Angeles Times said, "the players frame Malkmus’ vocals with music of constant invention, from soft meditations to full-out fireworks. Sometimes it’s so relaxed it nearly stops, then it’s suddenly taut and jumpy." The music has drawn comparisons to the "loopiness" of the Meat Puppets and the country folk of the Rolling Stones and the Flying Burrito Brothers. Cromelin also noted the presence of "a chirpy pop tunefulness" on the album, though not without what he said was "enough contrary abrasiveness to keep you from getting too comfortable with them."

Lyrically, NME described the album's tracks as "New York stories about coming to terms with the city and its excesses, about finding yourself in a world of drug-addled rock piggery and platitude-slinging fools and still, somehow, keeping archly calm.” According to Jim DeRogatis, writing for Chicago Sun-Times, the album's lyrics "are less important than the way Pavement uses catchy vocal harmonies to establish different moods."

== Release and promotion ==
Crooked Rain, Crooked Rain was released on February 14, 1994, by Matador Records. As of 2009, the album had sold about 500,000 copies.

In 2004, Matador released Crooked Rain, Crooked Rain: LA's Desert Origins, a compilation containing the album in its entirety, as well outtakes and other rarities from the same era.

== Critical reception ==
Professional ratings
Review scores
Source	Rating
AllMusic	5/5 stars
Chicago Sun-Times	4/4 stars
Entertainment Weekly	B+
Los Angeles Times	3.5/4 stars
NME	8/10
Rolling Stone	4/5 stars
The Rolling Stone Album Guide	5/5 stars
Select	4/5
Spin Alternative Record Guide	9/10
The Village Voice	A

AllMusic's Stephen Thomas Erlewine gave Crooked Rain a perfect five-star rating, describing it as "the Reckoning to Slanted & Enchanted's Murmur." He concluded that the album was "a vibrant, dynamic, emotionally resonant album that stands as a touchstone of underground rock in the '90s and one of the great albums of its decade." Robert Christgau of the Village Voice gave the album an A grade, describing it as "a tour de force melodywise." Entertainment Weekly's David Browne gave the album a B+, writing that "Crooked Rain, Crooked Rain is just a bunch of guys dwelling on topics like skateboarding, plane crashes, girls, and mocking Stone Temple Pilots. When they set those sentiments to bumpy-road drones or a bit of a country lilt...the result has a subtle, ingratiating beauty." Los Angeles Times critic Richard Cromelin gave the album 3.5 out of 4 stars. Cromelin wrote that the album contains "some of the Meat Puppets' loopiness, a Stones/Burritos folk-country resonance, and a chirpy pop tunefulness — along with enough contrary abrasiveness to keep you from getting too comfortable with them."

== Legacy ==
Crooked Rain, Crooked Rain has been called "the quintessential slacker rock album." In 2003, the album was ranked number 210 on Rolling Stone magazine's list of the 500 greatest albums of all time, and 212 in a 2012 revised list. In the 2020 update of the list, the album's rank dropped to number 434. It was also ranked number 10 on their best albums of the Nineties. In 2003, it was ranked number 8 on Pitchfork's list Top 100 Albums of the 1990s, and in 2010, the song "Gold Soundz" was listed as number one on Pitchfork's 200 Greatest Songs of the 1990s. In 2026, Pitchfork subsequently named the album #1 on its list of the 100 Best Indie Rock Albums of All Time. In July 2014, Guitar World ranked Crooked Rain, Crooked Rain at number 21 in their "Superunknown: 50 Iconic Albums That Defined 1994" list. The photo in the middle of the cover was taken from the March 1978 issue of National Geographic. The album was also included in the book 1001 Albums You Must Hear Before You Die.

Crooked Rain, Crooked Rain was included in the 2014 reference book Gimme Indie Rock by music journalist Andrew Earles. He wrote: "The pre-release hype and hoopla for this album was like a somewhat smaller-scale version of the anticipatory climate that awaited Nirvana's In Utero."

Stephen Thomas Erlewine of AllMusic wrote: "Many bands attempted to replicate the sound or the vibe of Crooked Rain, Crooked Rain, but they never came close to the quicksilver shifts in music and emotion that give this album such lasting appeal. [...] By drawing on so many different influences, Pavement discovered its own distinctive voice as a band on Crooked Rain, Crooked Rain, creating a vibrant, dynamic, emotionally resonant album that stands as a touchstone of underground rock in the '90s and one of the great albums of its decade."

== Track listing ==
=== Original 1994 version ===
All tracks are written by Stephen Malkmus, except "Hit the Plane Down", which was written by Scott Kannberg.

No.	Title	Length
1.	"Silence Kid" ( (Note: Due to an ink splodge on the back of the original artwork, the song "Silence Kid" has become erroneously known as "Silence Kit". This misnomer persisted when designer Mark Ohe printed it onto the back of the reissue Crooked Rain, Crooked Rain: LA's Desert Origins, despite the interior artwork showing the correct name in print several times, including written in Stephen Malkmus' own handwriting.))	3:01
2.	"Elevate Me Later"	2:51
3.	"Stop Breathin"	4:28
4.	"Cut Your Hair"	3:07
5.	"Newark Wilder"	3:53
6.	"Unfair"	2:33
7.	"Gold Soundz"	2:41
8.	"5-4=Unity"	2:09
9.	"Range Life"	4:54
10.	"Heaven Is a Truck"	2:30
11.	"Hit the Plane Down"	3:36
12.	"Fillmore Jive"	6:38

=== Crooked Rain, Crooked Rain: LA's Desert Origins (2004) ===
Disc One - Back To The Gold Soundz (Phantom Power Parables)

No.	Title	Source	Length
1.	"Silence Kid"	Crooked Rain, Crooked Rain	3:00
2.	"Elevate Me Later"	Crooked Rain, Crooked Rain	2:51
3.	"Stop Breathin'"	Crooked Rain, Crooked Rain	4:27
4.	"Cut Your Hair"	Crooked Rain, Crooked Rain	3:06
5.	"Newark Wilder"	Crooked Rain, Crooked Rain	3:53
6.	"Unfair"	Crooked Rain, Crooked Rain	2:33
7.	"Gold Soundz"	Crooked Rain, Crooked Rain	2:39
8.	"5 - 4 = Unity"	Crooked Rain, Crooked Rain	2:09
9.	"Range Life"	Crooked Rain, Crooked Rain	4:54
10.	"Heaven Is a Truck"	Crooked Rain, Crooked Rain	2:30
11.	"Hit the Plane Down"	Crooked Rain, Crooked Rain	3:36
12.	"Fillmore Jive"	Crooked Rain, Crooked Rain	6:38
13.	"Camera"	Cut Your Hair 7"	3:45
14.	"Stare"	Cut Your Hair 7"	2:51
15.	"Raft"	Range Life 7"	3:34
16.	"Coolin' by Sound"	Range Life 7"	2:50
17.	"Kneeling Bus"	Gold Soundz 7"	1:33
18.	"Strings of Nashville"	Gold Soundz 7"	3:46
19.	"Exit Theory"	Gold Soundz 7"	1:00
20.	"5 - 4 Vocal"	Gold Soundz 7"	2:08
21.	"Jam Kids"	Haunt You Down / Jam Kids 7"	4:54
22.	"Haunt You Down"	Haunt You Down / Jam Kids 7"	4:51
23.	"Unseen Power of the Picket Fence"	No Alternative	3:51
24.	"Nail Clinic"	Hey, Drag City!	2:25

Disc Two - After The Glow (Where Eagles Dare)

No.	Title	Source	Length
1.	"All My Friends"	Recorded in early 1993 at Louder Than You Think in Stockton, California	5:12
2.	"Soiled Little Filly"	Recorded in early 1993 at Louder Than You Think in Stockton, California	2:08
3.	"Range Life"	Recorded in early 1993 at Louder Than You Think in Stockton, California	4:11
4.	"Stop Breathing"	Recorded in early 1993 at Louder Than You Think in Stockton, California	3:54
5.	"Ell Ess Two"	Recorded in early 1993 at Louder Than You Think in Stockton, California	2:44
6.	"Flux = Rad"	Recorded in early 1993 at Louder Than You Think in Stockton, California	2:11
7.	"Bad Version of War"	Recorded in early 1993 at Louder Than You Think in Stockton, California	3:27
8.	"Same Way of Saying"	Recorded in early 1993 at Louder Than You Think in Stockton, California	4:35
9.	"Hands Off the Bayou"	Recorded in August and September 1993 at Random Falls in New York City	2:43
10.	"Heaven is a Truck (Egg Shell)"	Recorded in August and September 1993 at Random Falls in New York City	2:20
11.	"Grounded"	Recorded in August and September 1993 at Random Falls in New York City	3:35
12.	"Kennel District"	Recorded in August and September 1993 at Random Falls in New York City	3:24
13.	"Pueblo (Beach Boys)"	Recorded in August and September 1993 at Random Falls in New York City	3:47
14.	"Fucking Righteous"	Recorded in August and September 1993 at Random Falls in New York City	2:47
15.	"Colorado"	Recorded in August and September 1993 at Random Falls in New York City	1:13
16.	"Dark Ages"	Recorded in August and September 1993 at Random Falls in New York City	2:39
17.	"Flood Victim"	Recorded in August and September 1993 at Random Falls in New York City	1:17
18.	"JMC Retro"	Recorded in August and September 1993 at Random Falls in New York City	0:52
19.	"Rug Rat"	Recorded in August and September 1993 at Random Falls in New York City	3:05
20.	"Strings of Nashville (Instrumental)"	Recorded in August and September 1993 at Random Falls in New York City	3:50
21.	"Instrumental"	Recorded in August and September 1993 at Random Falls in New York City	3:40
22.	"Brink of the Clouds"	John Peel Session (Transmitted February 26, 1994)	3:48
23.	"Tartar Martyr"	John Peel Session (Transmitted February 26, 1994)	3:13
24.	"Pueblo Domain"	John Peel Session (Transmitted February 26, 1994)	4:18
25.	"The Sutcliffe Catering Song"	John Peel Session (Transmitted February 26, 1994)	3:22

== Personnel ==
Credits adapted from the album's liner notes.

Pavement

- Stephen Malkmus – vocals, guitar, bass
- Scott Kannberg – guitar, vocals, organ, percussion
- Mark Ibold – bass, vocals
- Steve West – drums, percussion
- Bob Nastanovich – percussion, vocals

Technical

- Pavement – production
- Bryce Goggin – engineer, mixing, piano (9)
- Mark Venezia – engineer

== Weekly charts ==
Chart (1994)	Peak position
Australian Albums (ARIA)	86
German Albums (Offizielle Top 100)	77
New Zealand Albums (RMNZ)	41
UK Albums (Official Charts)	15
Scottish Albums (Official Charts)	32
US Billboard 200	121
US Billboard Heatseekers Albums	2
European Albums (Eurotipsheet)	66

Chart (2004)	Peak position
US Billboard 200	164
US Billboard Independent Albums	14

== Certifications ==
Region	Certification	Certified units/sales
United Kingdom (BPI)	Silver	60,000^{‡}
^{‡} Sales+streaming figures based on certification alone.

== See also ==
- Crooked Rain, Crooked Rain: LA's Desert Origins
