= Preston Castle =

Preston Castle may refer to the following locations:

- Preston Castle, Lancashire in England
- Preston Castle (Ione, California), also known as the Preston School of Industry
