= Pazz & Jop =

Annual poll of top musical releases

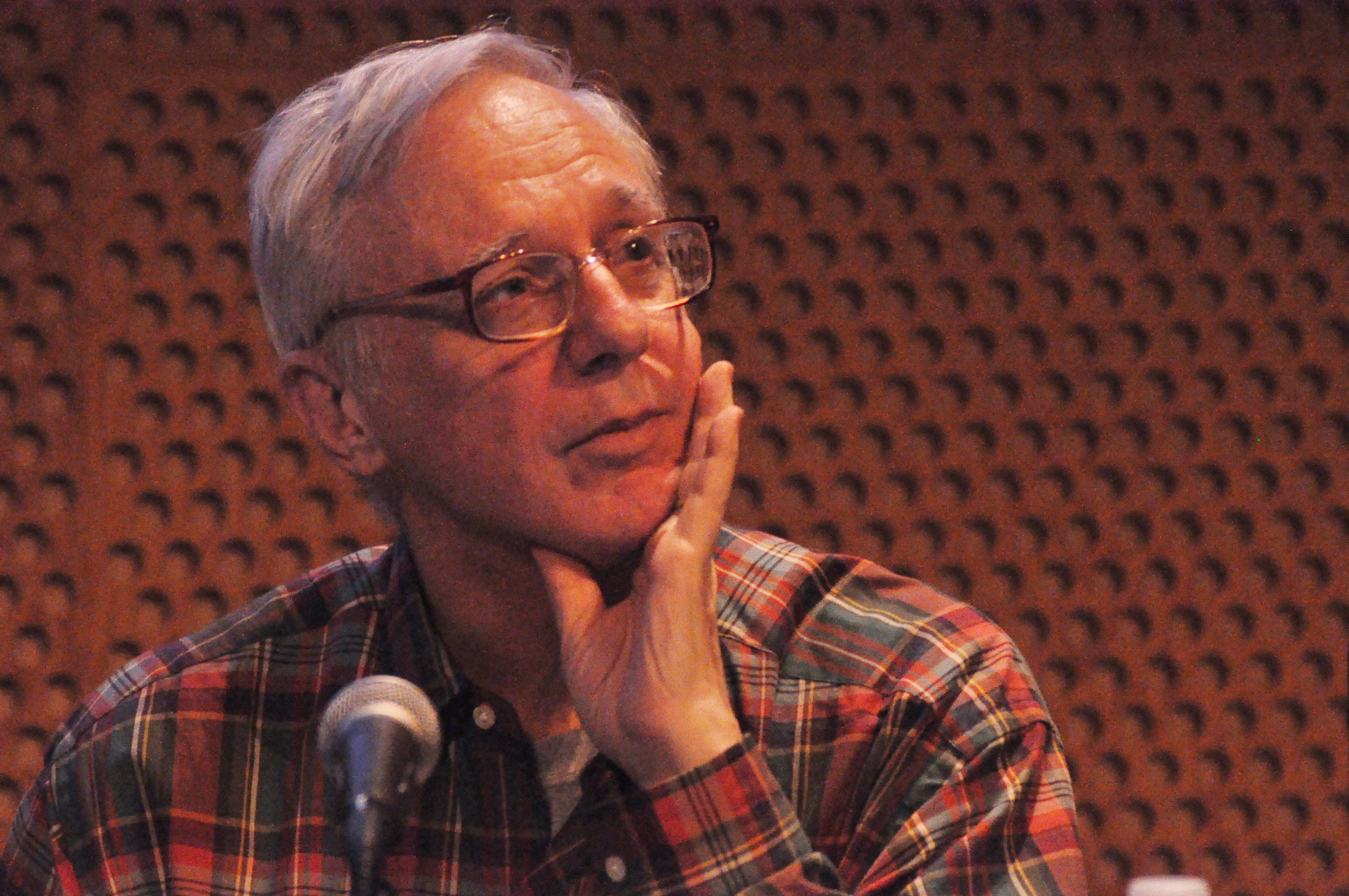
Music critic Robert Christgau created the Pazz & Jop poll and presided over it from its inception in 1971 to 2005.

Pazz & Jop was an annual poll of top musical releases, compiled by American newspaper The Village Voice and created by music critic Robert Christgau. It published lists of the year's top releases for 1971 and, after Christgau's two-year absence from the Voice, each year from 1974 till 2018. The polls were tabulated from the submitted year-end top 10 lists of hundreds of music critics. It was named in acknowledgement of the defunct magazine Jazz & Pop, and adopted the ratings system used in that publication's annual critics poll.

== History ==
The Pazz & Jop was introduced by The Village Voice in 1971 as an album-only poll; it was expanded to include votes for singles in 1979. Throughout the years, other minor lists had been elicited from poll respondents for releases such as extended plays, music videos, album re-issues, and compilation albums—all of which were discontinued after only a few years. The Pazz & Jop albums poll uses a points system to formulate list rankings. Participating critics assigned a number value, ranging from 5 to 30, to each of the albums on their top 10 list, with all 10 albums totaling 100 points. The singles lists, however, are always unweighted.

The Pazz & Jop was created by Village Voice critic Robert Christgau. The idea behind its name (a spoonerism of Jazz & Pop) was that, since the words "pazz" and "jop" do not exist, participating critics would judge a musical work on its own merits rather than be distracted by categories and genres. In 1971, English rock band the Who topped the first Pazz & Jop albums poll with Who's Next. The following year, Christgau left The Village Voice for Newsday, and the poll was not conducted again until 1974, when Christgau returned to the Voice and the poll "became an institution", according to fellow Voice critic Chris Molanphy. English singer Ian Dury and his band the Blockheads topped the first singles poll with "Hit Me with Your Rhythm Stick" (1979). Bob Dylan and Kanye West topped the albums poll the most number of times, with four number-one albums each. West, in addition, won the singles poll of 2005. Christgau oversaw the Pazz & Jop poll for more than thirty years; he also wrote an accompanying essay that discussed the poll's contents.

Writing in 2002, author Bernard Gendron cited the lack of overlap between the 1999 poll results and that year's best-selling albums on Billboard's US charts—whereby only five of Pazz & Jop's top 40 appeared in the Billboard list—as indicative of a continued division between the avant-garde aesthetic of cultural accreditation and commercial considerations. Although Pazz & Jop established itself as a critics' poll with a clear identity, it has attracted criticism, particularly for its methodology. Addressing the participants in 2001, Mike Doughty of the New York Press complained: "In the guise of a love of music, you've taken the most beautiful nebulous form of human expression, squeezed it through an asinine points-scoring system specially cooked up for this pointless perennial, and forced it into this baffling, heinous chart system."

== Later years ==
Christgau's tenure as Pazz & Jop overseer came to an abrupt end when he was controversially fired from The Village Voice after a company buy-out in August 2006. In response to his dismissal, several prominent critics publicly announced that they would no longer be turning in their lists for the poll; Sasha Frere-Jones of The New Yorker described Christgau's firing as "a slap in the face to so many of us [critics] in so many ways". Regardless, The Village Voice continued to run the feature, with Rob Harvilla succeeding Christgau as music editor and overseer of the poll. Christgau's annual Pazz & Jop overview essay was discontinued and substituted with multiple retrospective articles of the year's music written by a selection of critics.

In 2016, the poll's name was changed from Pazz & Jop to the Village Voice Music Critics Poll by the new owners of the newspaper. Christgau, who had continued to vote in the poll since his departure from the newspaper, expressed dismay at the name change. When the 2016 results were announced in January 2017, the poll had reverted to its Pazz & Jop name.

The Village Voice ceased publication altogether in August 2018. Despite the closure of the newspaper, a Pazz & Jop poll for 2018 was announced on December 20, with Christgau confirming its legitimacy on Twitter. The 2018 poll was published on The Village Voice's website on February 6, 2019.

Glenn Boothe and Keith Artin had organised a "Village Voice Pazz & Jop Rip-Off Poll" starting in 1995 and created a Facebook Group for the poll in 2019. The poll was conducted via private Facebook group and included over 1,100 members—music writers, business execs, or artists themselves. Purple Mountains' eponymous album was voted the best album of 2019. Uproxx also launched an annual music critic poll in 2018.

== Albums voted number one ==
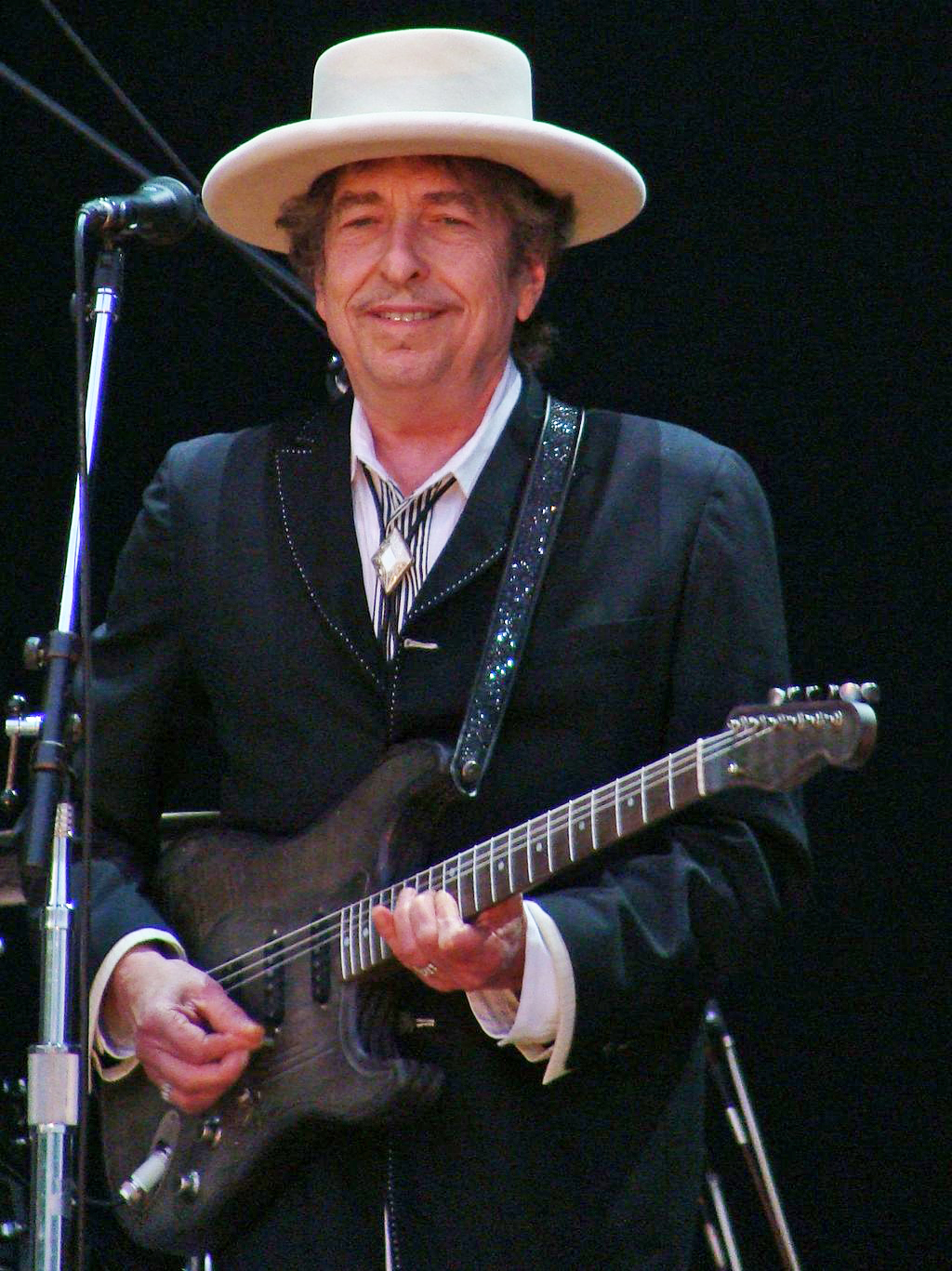
American musician Bob Dylan topped the Pazz & Jop albums poll four times.

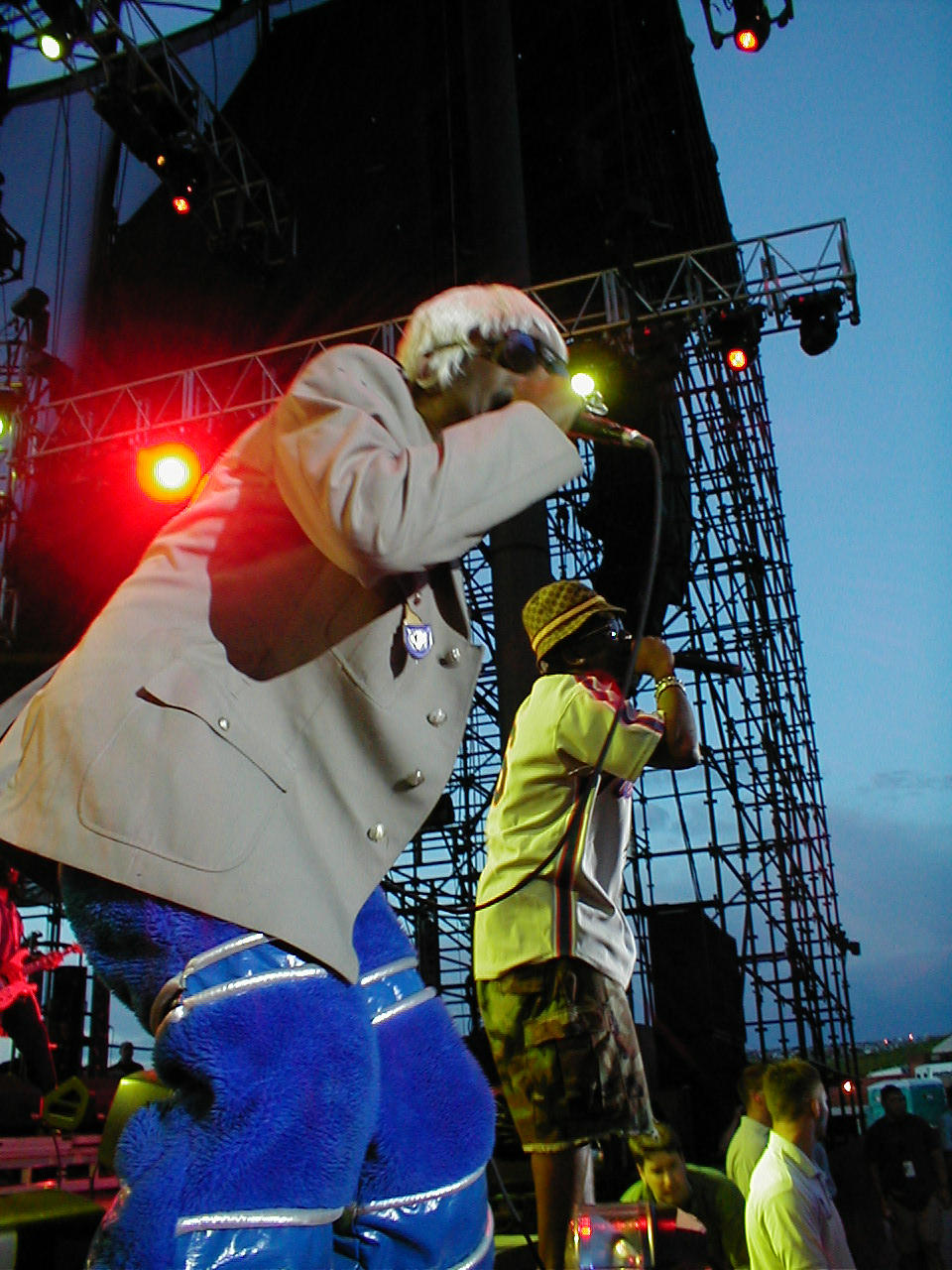
Speakerboxxx/The Love Below (2003) by American hip hop duo Outkast garnered the most total points of any number-one album in the history of the poll.

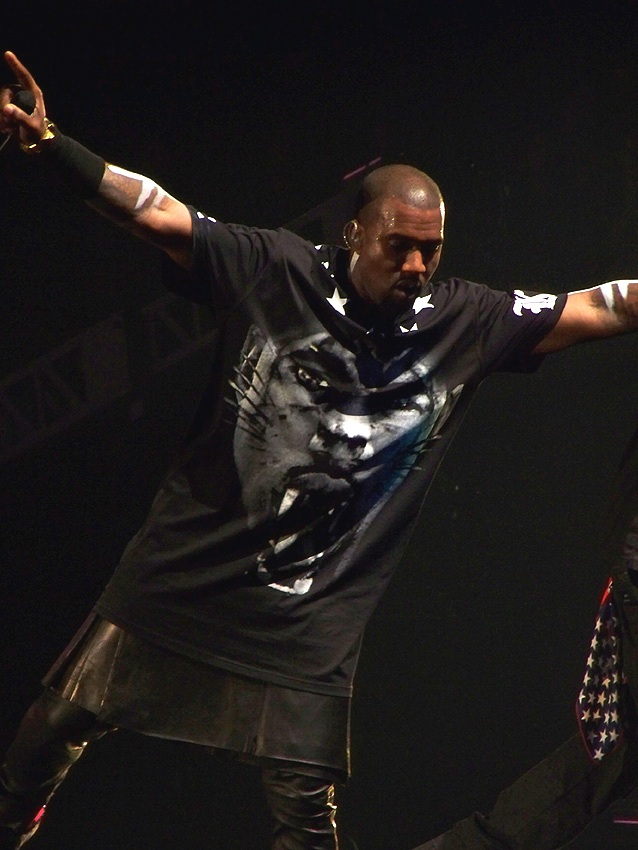
American hip-hop artist Kanye West topped the Pazz & Jop albums poll four times out of the eight solo albums he released during the poll's existence.

Year	Artist	Album	Mentions	Points	Ref.
1971	The Who	Who's Next	N/A	540	
1974	Joni Mitchell	Court and Spark	14	186	
1975	Bob Dylan and The Band	The Basement Tapes	23	285	
1976	Stevie Wonder	Songs in the Key of Life	25	292	
1977	Sex Pistols	Never Mind the Bollocks, Here's the Sex Pistols	32	412	
1978	Elvis Costello and the Attractions	This Year's Model	58	783	
1979	Graham Parker	Squeezing Out Sparks	63	767	
1980	The Clash	London Calling	89	1,347	
1981	The Clash	Sandinista!	67	862	
1982	Elvis Costello and the Attractions	Imperial Bedroom	87	1,061	
1983	Michael Jackson	Thriller	100	1,305	
1984	Bruce Springsteen	Born in the U.S.A.	136	1,757	
1985	Talking Heads	Little Creatures	99	1,078	
1986	Paul Simon	Graceland	96	1,131	
1987	Prince	Sign o' the Times	118	1,491	
1988	Public Enemy	It Takes a Nation of Millions to Hold Us Back	79	1,011	
1989	De La Soul	3 Feet High and Rising	89	1,050	
1990	Neil Young and Crazy Horse	Ragged Glory	104	1,282	
1991	Nirvana	Nevermind	134	1,699	
1992	Arrested Development	3 Years, 5 Months & 2 Days in the Life Of...	97	1,050	
1993	Liz Phair	Exile in Guyville	108	1,383	
1994	Hole	Live Through This	121	1,552	
1995	PJ Harvey	To Bring You My Love	120	1,492	
1996	Beck	Odelay	110	1,134	
1997	Bob Dylan	Time Out of Mind	135	1,655	
1998	Lucinda Williams	Car Wheels on a Gravel Road	167	2,129	
1999	Moby	Play	134	1,548	
2000	Outkast	Stankonia	220	2,660	
2001	Bob Dylan	Love and Theft	235	3,010	
2002	Wilco	Yankee Hotel Foxtrot	201	2,328	
2003	Outkast	Speakerboxxx/The Love Below	305	3,554	
2004	Kanye West	The College Dropout	245	2,826	
2005	Kanye West	Late Registration	227	2,525	
2006	Bob Dylan	Modern Times	95	1,123	
2007	LCD Soundsystem	Sound of Silver	141	1,662	
2008	TV on the Radio	Dear Science	154	1,744	
2009	Animal Collective	Merriweather Post Pavilion	154	1,794	
2010	Kanye West	My Beautiful Dark Twisted Fantasy	266	3,250	
2011	Tune-Yards	Whokill	135	1,645	
2012	Frank Ocean	Channel Orange	170	1,952	
2013	Kanye West	Yeezus	160	1,991	
2014	D'Angelo and the Vanguard	Black Messiah	163	2,008	
2015	Kendrick Lamar	To Pimp a Butterfly	210	2,639	
2016	David Bowie	Blackstar	209	2,367	
2017	Kendrick Lamar	Damn	N/A	1,756	
2018	Kacey Musgraves	Golden Hour	100	1,155	

== Singles voted number one ==
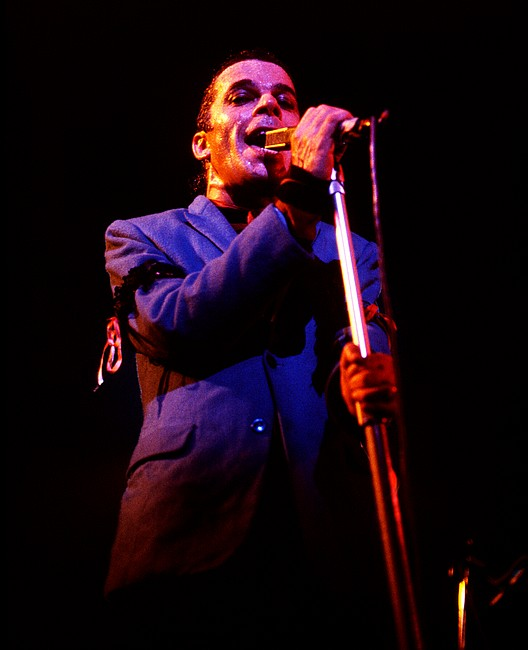
English musician Ian Dury performed "Hit Me with Your Rhythm Stick", which topped the first singles poll in 1979.

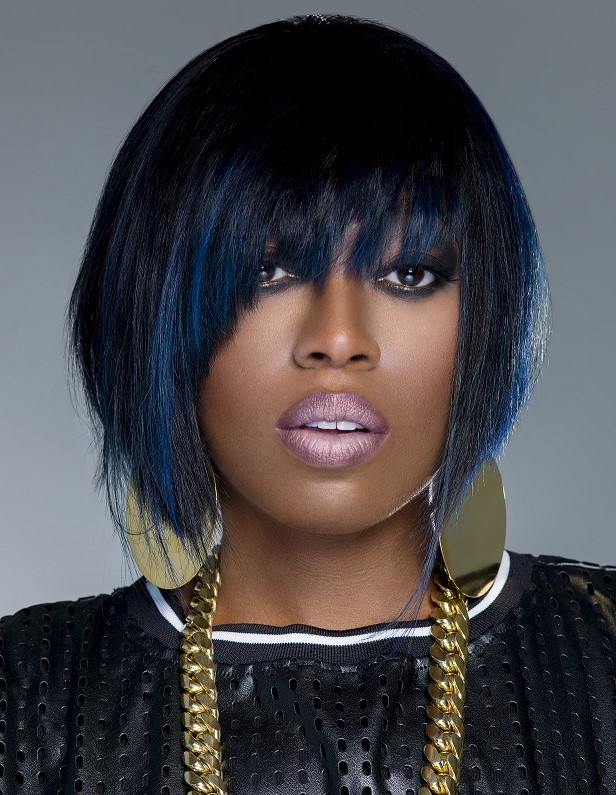
American rapper Missy Elliott is the only artist with two consecutive Pazz & Jop number-one singles: "Get Ur Freak On" and "Work It".

Year	Artist	Single	Mentions	Ref.
1979	Ian Dury and the Blockheads	"Hit Me with Your Rhythm Stick"/"Reasons to be Cheerful, Part 3"	29	
1980	Kurtis Blow	"The Breaks"	40	
1981	Laurie Anderson	"O Superman"/"Walk the Dog"	56	
1981	The Rolling Stones	"Start Me Up"	56	
1982	Grandmaster Flash and the Furious Five	"The Message"	156	
1983	Michael Jackson	"Billie Jean"	75	
1984	Prince	"When Doves Cry"/"17 Days"	111	
1985	Artists United Against Apartheid	"Sun City"	101	
1986	Run–D.M.C.	"Walk This Way"	78	
1987	Prince	"Sign o' the Times"	54	
1988	Tracy Chapman	"Fast Car"	55	
1989	Public Enemy	"Fight the Power"	75	
1990	Deee-Lite	"Groove Is in the Heart"/"What Is Love?"	74	
1991	Nirvana	"Smells Like Teen Spirit"	116	
1992	Arrested Development	"Tennessee"	100	
1993	The Breeders	"Cannonball"	78	
1994	Beck	"Loser"	89	
1995	Coolio featuring L.V.	"Gangsta's Paradise"	81	
1996	Quad City DJ's	"C'mon N' Ride It (The Train)"	34	
1997	Hanson	"MMMBop"	96	
1998	Fatboy Slim	"The Rockafeller Skank"	110	
1999	TLC	"No Scrubs"	109	
2000	Outkast	"Ms. Jackson"	124	
2001	Missy Elliott	"Get Ur Freak On"	176	
2002	Missy Elliott	"Work It"	212	
2003	Outkast	"Hey Ya!"	322	
2004	Franz Ferdinand	"Take Me Out"	145	
2005	Kanye West featuring Jamie Foxx	"Gold Digger"	145	
2006	Gnarls Barkley	"Crazy"	151	
2007	Amy Winehouse	"Rehab"	97	
2008	M.I.A.	"Paper Planes"	107	
2009	Jay-Z featuring Alicia Keys	"Empire State of Mind"	89	
2010	Cee Lo Green	"Fuck You"	187	
2011	Adele	"Rolling in the Deep"	116	
2012	Carly Rae Jepsen	"Call Me Maybe"	94	
2013	Daft Punk featuring Pharrell Williams	"Get Lucky"	117	
2014	Future Islands	"Seasons (Waiting on You)"	75	
2015	Drake	"Hotline Bling"	76	
2016	Beyoncé	"Formation"	99	
2017	Cardi B	"Bodak Yellow"	62	
2018	Childish Gambino	"This Is America"	64	

== Defunct categories ==
=== Compilation albums ===
Year	Artist	Album	Mentions	Ref.
1995	Various artists	Macro Dub Infection: Volume One	28	
1996	LTJ Bukem	Logical Progression	11	

=== Album re-issues ===
Year	Artist	Album	Mentions	Ref.
1986	The Neville Brothers	Treacherous: A History of the Neville Brothers (1955–1985)	43	
1987	James Carr	At the Dark End of the Street	35	
1988	Chuck Berry	The Chess Box	35	
1989	Muddy Waters	The Chess Box	65	
1990	Robert Johnson	The Complete Recordings	108	
1991	James Brown	Star Time	84	
1992	Bob Marley	Songs of Freedom	51	
1993	The Beach Boys	Good Vibrations: Thirty Years of The Beach Boys	42	
1994	Louis Armstrong	Portrait of the Artist as a Young Man (1923–1934)	34	
1995	The Velvet Underground	Peel Slowly and See	57	
1996	Sun Ra	The Singles	25	
1997	Various artists	Anthology of American Folk Music	100	
1998	Various artists	Nuggets: Original Artyfacts from the First Psychedelic Era, 1965–1968	111	
1999	Os Mutantes	Everything Is Possible: The Best of Os Mutantes	31	
1999	Various artists	Loud, Fast and Out of Control: The Wild Sounds of '50s Rock	31	

=== Extended plays ===
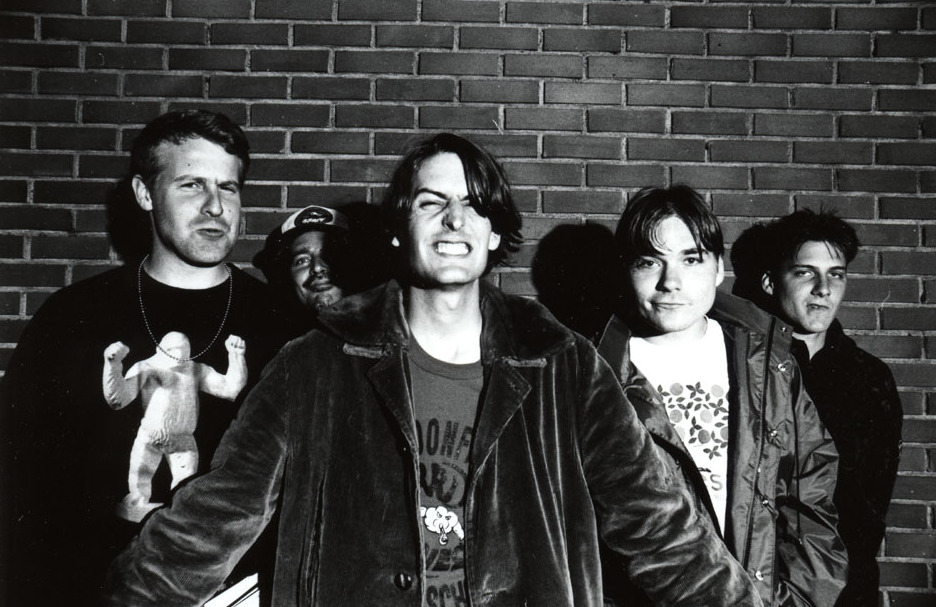
Perfect Sound Forever and Watery, Domestic by American indie rock band Pavement were voted the number-one extended plays of their respective release years.

Year	Artist	Album	Mentions	Ref.
1981	The Specials	Ghost Town	44	
1982	T-Bone Burnett	Trap Door	75	
1983	Los Lobos	...And a Time to Dance	54	
1984	Tommy Keene	Places That Are Gone	32	
1985	Alex Chilton	Feudalist Tarts	32	
1986	Alex Chilton	No Sex	27	
1988	Bruce Springsteen	Chimes of Freedom	13	
1989	Lucinda Williams	Passionate Kisses	17	
1990	The Mekons	F.U.N. '90	27	
1991	Pavement	Perfect Sound Forever	26	
1992	Pavement	Watery, Domestic	23	
1993	Luscious Jackson	In Search of Manny	31	
1994	Pizzicato Five	Five by Five	15	

=== Music videos ===
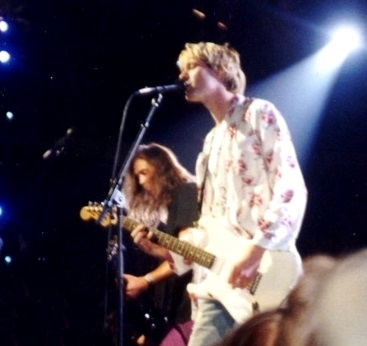
American rock band Nirvana topped the music videos poll for three consecutive years.

Year	Artist	Music video	Director(s)	Mentions	Ref.
1983	Michael Jackson	"Beat It"	Bob Giraldi	63	
1984	Art of Noise	"Close (To the Edit)"	Zbigniew Rybczyński	35	
1985	Artists United Against Apartheid	"Sun City"	Jonathan Demme, Godley & Creme	68	
1986	Peter Gabriel	"Sledgehammer"	Stephen R. Johnson	87	
1987	Squeeze	"Hourglass"	Ade Edmondson	12	
1990	Deee-Lite	"Groove Is in the Heart"	Hiroyuki Nakano	35	
1990	Madonna	"Justify My Love"	Jean-Baptiste Mondino	35	
1991	Nirvana	"Smells Like Teen Spirit"	Samuel Bayer	59	
1992	Nirvana	"In Bloom"	Kevin Kerslake	23	
1993	Nirvana	"Heart-Shaped Box"	Anton Corbijn	34	
1994	Beastie Boys	"Sabotage"	Spike Jonze	66	
1995	Björk	"It's Oh So Quiet"	Spike Jonze	33	
