= Summer Babe =

Single by Pavement

Single by Pavement

from the album Slanted and Enchanted
- Released: August 23, 1991
- Recorded: 1990
- Studio: Louder Than You Think Studios (Stockton, California)
- Genre: Indie rock; jangle pop; noise pop
- Length: 3:16 (album version); 3:13 (radio edit)
- Label: Matador (album version); Drag City (single version)
- Songwriters: Stephen Malkmus; Scott Kannberg
- Producer: Pavement

Pavement singles chronology
"Summer Babe" (1991)	"Trigger Cut" (1992)

"Summer Babe", also known as "Summer Babe (Winter Version)", is the debut single by the American indie rock band Pavement.

== Release ==
"Summer Babe" was first released as a 7" single (listed and described as an EP at the time) by Chicago's Drag City Records on August 23, 1991. It was their only single on the Drag City label before the band moved to New York–based Matador Records. The songs on the Drag City single would later be included on the Drag City compilation Westing (By Musket & Sextant), and on Matador's Slanted & Enchanted: Luxe & Reduxe. The song didn't enter the U.S. Billboard charts.

A slightly different mix of the song with different vocals, officially known as "Summer Babe (Winter Version)", later became the first track on the band's debut album, Slanted and Enchanted, released in April 1992. In 2024, "Summer Babe (Winter Version)" was ranked number 244 by Rolling Stone magazine on its list of the "500 Greatest Songs of All Time". In 2019, Paste ranked the song number two on their list of the 15 greatest Pavement songs, and in 2022, Consequence of Sound ranked the song number five on their list of the 10 greatest Pavement songs.

== Composition ==
The songs were written by Stephen Malkmus, who was then living in Hoboken or Jersey City at the time along with Scott Kannberg, and the recording was produced by the duo.

== Reception ==
Pitchfork said the song "sketches Malkmus' balancing act between the court jester and the savant. It takes a foolish confidence to start your debut single with "Ice baby" only two years removed from Vanilla Ice's billboard-topping single. "Summer Babe" careens between self-seriousness and complete nonsense; when Malkmus sings, with an exasperated laugh, "Drop off," it's as if he’s laughing at himself."

== Track listing ==
No.	Title	Length
1.	"Summer Babe"	3:13
2.	"Mercy Snack: The Laundromat"	1:39
3.	"Baptist Blacktick"	2:03
Total length:		6:55

== Music video ==
The music video of the song, which is quite rare, was directed by a woman referred to as "Tanya S," an early member of the Silver Jews. The video features Malkmus, Nastanovich, and Ibold miming the song (with either some or no instruments) along with backdrops of New York City and clips of Malkmus' then-girlfriend (another early ex-Silver Jews member) interspersed.
