= Demolition Plot J-7 =

EP by Pavement
- Released: June 1, 1990
- Recorded: October 16–17, 1989
- Studio: Louder Than You Think Studios (Stockton, California)
- Genre: Indie rock; lo-fi; noise pop
- Length: 12:03
- Label: Drag City
- Producer: Gary Young

Pavement chronology
| Slay Tracks: 1933–1969 (1989) | Demolition Plot J-7 (1990) | Perfect Sound Forever (1991) |

Demolition Plot J-7 is the second EP by American indie rock band Pavement, released on June 1, 1990. The EP was the band's first release on Chicago independent label Drag City, and its first release that was not self-issued. It is also the band's only release to feature drummer Jason Turner. Demolition Plot J-7 shared many of the same indie and punk rock influences of Pavement's 1989 debut Slay Tracks: 1933–1969, but also diversified the group's sound by incorporating keyboards.

Many of the songs on Demolition J-7 were written while Scott Kannberg and Jason Turner were in their short-lived band, Pa. After Stephen Malkmus heard demos recorded by Pa, the songs turned into a Pavement project. The recording session for Demolition J-7 was more difficult than for Slay Tracks due to tension between producer Gary Young and Turner. The EP received favorable reception from critics and fans, and solidified the band's cult fanbase.

== Background ==
Pavement had attained a degree of success within the underground music scene with its 1989 debut EP Slay Tracks: 1933–1969. While Malkmus was traveling to parts of Europe, North Africa, and the Middle East, Kannberg managed Slay Track's release on the band's self-owned label, Treble Kicker. Slay Tracks caught the attention of Dan Koretzky, an avid record collector working at Reckless Records in Chicago. Koretzky ordered 200 copies of the EP for the record store, and asked Kannberg to sign to his newly started independent label, Drag City. At the time the members of Pavement anticipated no further releases beyond Slay Tracks, and Kannberg initially expressed reluctance to sign to any label. Kannberg later said "I started talking to [Koretzky] and in our conversations he said 'I'm starting this label. Do you want to do something for us?' I said, 'Well I don't know if we're even a band. Steve is off in Europe.' He said, "Well if you want to I'm up for it.'"

While Malkmus was still abroad, Kannberg moved in with a friend and his roommate Jason Turner in Sacramento, California. Turner and Kannberg formed a new band called Pa, with Turner on drums. Kannberg said, "I didn't know if Pavement was going to do anything so I just said, 'Let's start another band.'" The duo frequently jammed, and considered a future release on Drag City. Pa recorded a series of instrumental demos, including new songs "Two States", "Forklift", and "Collapse", at Young's Louder Than You Think studios during a trip to Stockton. After Kannberg and Fawkes had returned to Sacramento, Malkmus visited and the group decided to turn the Pa songs into a Pavement project. Malkmus wrote lyrics to "Forklift" and presented the band with "two or three other songs" he had previously written.

== Recording ==
Demolition Plot J-7 was, like Slay Tracks and the Pa demos, recorded by Gary Young at his Louder Than You Think studios in Stockton. The recording took place on October 16 and October 17, 1989. Malkmus was influenced by the rehearsal style of jazz musicians as significant to the EP's recording, saying "When we start recording, we're really focused on what we're doing. We know how it's going to sound in the studio. We don't have to worry if it's sounding good in the rehearsal space. We take those prescriptions from the great jazz people and applied them to our own framework."

The addition of Turner to the band created tension with Young. Young had served as the primary drummer on Slay Tracks, with Malkmus and Kannberg drumming on a few songs. Young did not play any drums for the Demolition Plot J-7 sessions, and expressed jealousy towards Turner, openly mocking the new drummer. However, Turner ultimately only played drums on the EP's opening track "Forklift", and Malkmus and Kannberg performed the rest of the songs.

== Composition and lyrics ==
"Forklift"
"Forklift", the opening track of Demolition Plot J-7, features fuzz guitar effects like many of Pavement's early material, as well as overdubbed electronic keyboard in the chorus.

Stephen Thomas Erlewine and Heather Phares wrote in Allmusic's biography of Pavement that, with Demolition Plot J-7, Pavement "had begun to forge [their] influences into its own signature sound." A review in the Baltimore City Paper likened the EP's sound to "a cross between The Fall (circa Frenz Experiment) and Half Japanese". A review in LA Weekly stated that "The guitar on 'Internal K-Dart' and 'Fork Lift' is patently similar to Big Black and Dinosaur Jr., but Pavement steer clear of the former's pretentiously bleak posturing and the latter's dreary self-pity". Malkmus noted the influence that jazz musicians had on the EP's recording, and acknowledged jazz albums Interstellar Space by John Coltrane and Andrew!!! by Andrew Hill as two of his favorite records. The EP is Pavement's first to incorporate keyboards.

The first song on the album, "Forklift", features fuzzy guitar effects, like much of the band's early material. "Forklift" also incorporates what Pavement biographer Rob Jovanovic calls "almost Kraftwerk-sounding" overdubbed electronic keyboard sounds in the chorus. "Spizzle Trunk" is a punk-influenced track with "thrashy guitars", but it also includes "barroom Jerry Lee Lewis piano buried in the mix". The next two tracks, "Recorder Grot" and "Internal K-Dart", are both heavy and guitar-oriented songs. "Perfect Depth" is, according to Jovanovic, a "gloriously messy sonic assault", and "reflects a more considered Malkmus attempt at lyric crafting, even if they are nonsensical and almost impossible to hear". The EP ends with "Recorder Grot (Rally)", a 21-second instrumental of guitar feedback.

== Release and reception ==
Between the release of Slay Tracks and the recording sessions for Demolition Plot J-7, Koretzky formed Drag City with Dan Osborn. The first release from the label was the Royal Trux single "Hero Zero", which sold well. Despite the new label's early financial struggles, Drag City used the profit from "Hero Zero" to press and release 1000 copies of Demolition Plot J-7. Kannberg designed the cover of the EP, as he had done previously with Slay Tracks.

Demolition Plot J-7 was met with favorable reviews upon its release, though most of these reviews were from underground music zines. One of the few reviewers from a major periodical to review Demolition Plot J-7 upon its release, Robert Christgau of the Village Voice, gave the EP a two-star honorable mention, citing "Forklift" as a highlight.

Demolition Plot J-7 was ranked as the fourth best EP of 1990 in the Village Voice Pazz & Jop Critic's Poll. Demolition Plot J-7 helped define the early "messed-up, art-steeped guitar noise" sound of Drag City, which would become a seminal independent label. Donna Freydkin of CNN.com wrote in a 1999 retrospective of the band's history that "it was with the release of the 1990 EP [Demolition Plot J-7] that Pavement secured a devoted following." Village Voice writer Michaelangelo Matos noted Demolition Plot J-7 and its follow-up, the 1991 EP Perfect Sound Forever, as "epochal to ... sloppy early-'90s undergrads."

== Track listing ==
All tracks were written by Stephen Malkmus and Scott Kannberg.

| No. | Title | Length |
|---|---|---|
| 1. | "Forklift" | 3:27 |
| 2. | "Spizzle Trunk" | 1:23 |
| 3. | "Recorder Grot" | 2:18 |
| 4. | "Internal K-Dart" | 1:51 |
| 5. | "Perfect Depth" | 2:43 |
| 6. | "Recorder Grot (Rally)" | 0:21 |

== Personnel ==
=== Pavement ===
- Stephen Malkmus – lead vocals (tracks 1–5), lead and rhythm guitar (tracks 1–2, 4–5), keyboard (track 1), electric piano (track 2), percussion (track 1)
- Scott Kannberg – lead and rhythm guitar (tracks 1–5), bass guitar (track 2), electric piano (track 2), synthesizer (track 4)
- Gary Young – drums (tracks 2, 4–5)

=== Additional musicians ===
- Jason Turner – drums (track 1)
- Kelly Hensley – percussion (track 4)
