= Doris & the Daggers =

Studio album by Spiral Stairs
- Released: March 24, 2017
- Genre: Pop rock
- Labels: Nine Mile, Domino

Spiral Stairs chronology
| The Real Feel (2009) | Doris & the Daggers (2017) | We Wanna Be Hyp-No-Tized (2019) |

Doris & the Daggers is a 2017 solo album from Spiral Stairs, formerly of Pavement and Preston School of Industry.

== Reception ==
Professional ratings
Aggregate scores
| Source | Rating |
|---|---|
| Metacritic | 74/100 |
Review scores
| Source | Rating |
| AllMusic | 4/5 stars |
| Clash | 6/10 |
| Exclaim! | 7/10 |
| musicOMH | 3.5/5 stars |
| Pitchfork | 6.4/10 |
| Under the Radar | 6.5/10 stars |

Doris & the Daggers received positive reviews from critics. On Metacritic, the album holds a score of 74/100 based on 13 reviews, indicating "generally favorable reviews".

== Track listing ==
1. "Dance (Cry Wolf)"
2. "Emoshuns"
3. "Dundee Man"
4. "AWM"
5. "No Comparison"
6. "The Unconditional"
7. "Trams (Stole My Love)"
8. "Exiled Tonight"
9. "Angel Eyes"
10. "Doris and the Daggers"
