= The Real Feel =

Studio album by Spiral Stairs
- Released: October 20, 2009
- Genre: Pop rock
- Length: 46:10
- Label: Matador

Spiral Stairs chronology
The Real Feel (2009)	Doris & the Daggers (2017)

The Real Feel is the 2009 debut solo album from Spiral Stairs (formerly of Pavement and Preston School of Industry).

== Reception ==
Professional ratings
Aggregate scores
Source	Rating
Metacritic	57/100
Review scores
Source	Rating
AllMusic	3/5 stars
The A.V. Club	C−
Drowned in Sound	5/10
NME	3.5/5 stars
Pitchfork Media	5.2/10
PopMatters	5/10 stars

The Real Feel received mixed reviews from critics. On Metacritic, the album holds a score of 57 out of 100 based on 15 reviews, indicating "mixed or average reviews".

== Track listing ==
1. True Love
2. Call The Ceasefire
3. Cold Change
4. Subiaco Shuffle
5. Wharf Hand Blues
6. Maltese T
7. A Mighty Mighty Fall
8. Stolen Pills
9. The Real Feel
10. Blood Money
11. Ladies and Gentlemen
