= Range Life (song) =

Single by Pavement

from the album Crooked Rain, Crooked Rain
- A-side: "Range Life"
- B-side: "Raft"; "Coolin' By Sound"
- Released: January 1995
- Recorded: August–September 1993
- Studio: Random Falls Studio (New York City, New York)
- Genre: Country rock; alternative country
- Length: 4:54
- Label: Big Cat (UK)
- Songwriter: Stephen Malkmus
- Producer: Pavement

Pavement singles chronology
"Gold Soundz" (1994)	"Range Life" (1995)	"Rattled by the Rush" (1995)

"Range Life" is a song by American indie rock band Pavement, the third single from their 1994 album Crooked Rain, Crooked Rain.

== Music and lyrics ==
Music critic Jake Kennedy of Record Collector described the song as "countrified" and said it was "lyrically as direct as the band ever got."

The song attracted attention with controversial lyrics that seemed to mock alternative rock superstars the Smashing Pumpkins and the Stone Temple Pilots; Pumpkins frontman Billy Corgan expressed his displeasure in magazine interviews, while songwriter Stephen Malkmus maintained that his words had been misinterpreted and no insult was intended. Regardless, Pavement, which was due to tour for Lollapalooza in 1994, got kicked out when the Smashing Pumpkins, the headlining act, threatened to cancel their dates if Pavement performed. Pavement would eventually play Lollapalooza the next year. An early 1993 demo of the song did not feature the controversial verse; guitarist Spiral Stairs recalled in 2004 that when Malkmus first revealed these new lyrics to his bandmates at the New York City recording sessions for Crooked Rain, Crooked Rain, "we almost lost our lunch from laughing so much."

== Reception and legacy ==
The single was not commercially released in the United States. It was issued by the band's UK label at the time, Big Cat Records. Both B-sides are outtakes from the Crooked Rain, Crooked Rain sessions and are included on the 2004 deluxe reissue of that album. This song was one of many to be included in the group's greatest hits album Quarantine the Past: The Best of Pavement.

Paste named it the 36th song of the 1990s and said, "it's not the snark that keeps me coming back, it's that odd sense of yearning—for stillness, for somewhere to land, for a version of your life you can picture but never quite reach—delivered so strangely vulnerably by a band who built their whole reputation on never seeming to want anything at all."

== Track listing ==
=== Europe release ===
All tracks are written by Stephen Malkmus except where noted.

No.	Title	Writer(s)	Length
1.	"Range Life"		5:01
2.	"Raft"		3:48
3.	"Coolin' By Sound"	Scott Kannberg	2:53

=== US promo ===
No.	Title	Length
1.	"Range Life (Edit)"	4:54
2.	"Range Life (Uncensored)"	4:54
