= Hospital (album) =

Studio album by Gary Young's Hospital
- Released: 25 October 1994
- Recorded: 1993–1994
- Studio: Louder Than You Think Studios (Stockton, California)
- Genre: Indie rock; outsider music
- Length: 42:36
- Label: Big Cat
- Producer: Gary Young

Gary Young's Hospital chronology
Hospital (1994)	Things We Do For You (1999)

Professional ratings
Review scores
Source	Rating
AllMusic	2.5/5 stars

Hospital is the debut studio album by the American musician Gary Young and his backing band Hospital, released in 1994. It was Young's first solo effort after being asked to leave the band Pavement.

== Background and recording ==
The album was recorded in Stockton, California, at Young's studio. "Geri" is about Young's wife. A video was produced for "Plant Man". Young promoted the album by playing on the 1995 Lollapalooza tour.

== Critical reception ==
AllMusic described it as "a roller coaster of chaotic and disjointed songs."

== Track listing ==
All songs written by Gary Young, except "Wipe Out" by The Surfaris.

1. Plant Man - 1:58
2. 1st Impression - 0:54
3. Mitchel - 1:00
4. Foothill Blvd. - 1:00
5. Real Call (No Video) - 1:18
6. Warren - 2:38
7. Hospital for the Chemically Insane - 0:30
8. Birds in Traffic - 4:32
9. Where Are You At - 1:27
10. Ralph the Vegetarian Robot - 2:36
11. Missing in Action - 3:32
12. Wipe Out (The Surfaris) - 1:24
13. 20th Day - 1:25
14. Geri - 0:43
15. Hooks of the Hiway - 5:57
16. Where Are You At [unlisted] - 1:31
17. Foothill Blvd. [Alt. version] [unlisted] - 4:20

== Personnel ==
=== Gary Young's Hospital ===
- Gary Young – lead vocals, drums
- Zach Silver – vocals, guitar, violin
- Robin Vanderpool – guitar, synthesizers
- Eric Westphal – bass, vocals, piano
- Kelly Foley – vocals, guitar, keyboards
- Robbie Warren – guitar
