= Gold Soundz =

Single by Pavement

from the album Crooked Rain, Crooked Rain
- Released: June 19, 1994
- Genre: Alternative rock
- Length: 2:39
- Label: Matador
- Songwriter: Stephen Malkmus
- Producer: Pavement

Pavement singles chronology
"Cut Your Hair" (1994)	"Gold Soundz" (1994)	"Range Life" (1995)

"Gold Soundz" is the second single released from Pavement's 1994 album Crooked Rain, Crooked Rain. The song did not perform particularly well as a single, failing to chart on the Billboard Hot Modern Rock Tracks chart, where their previous single, "Cut Your Hair", peaked at number 10. All the B-sides from both versions of the single are included on the reissue Crooked Rain, Crooked Rain: LA's Desert Origins.

== Music video ==
In the song's promotional video, directed by Scott Blen, the band members are dressed in Santa Claus suits as they cavort through various locations in and around Irvine, California. They go on a scavenger hunt, trying to find a chicken, which has a key to a car, which takes them to a hill next to a parking lot. Some of the members slide off, but still stay on the hill.

== Reception ==
"Gold Soundz" is widely regarded as one of Pavement's best songs. In 2019, Paste ranked the song number one on their list of the 15 greatest Pavement songs, and in 2022, Consequence of Sound ranked the song number two on their list of the 10 greatest Pavement songs. In 2010, Pitchfork listed "Gold Soundz" at number one on their list of the Top 200 Tracks of the 1990s; in the publication's 2022 ranking of the Top 250 Tracks of the 1990s, "Gold Soundz" was re-ranked at number 40.

== Track listing ==
=== United States ===
1. "Gold Soundz"
2. "Kneeling Bus"
3. "Strings of Nashville"
4. "Exit Theory" (edit)

=== Australia/New Zealand/French Micronesia 1994 tour EP ===
As listed on the CD cover:

1. "Gold Soundz"
2. "Kneeling Bus"
3. "Strings of Nashville"
4. "5 - 4 Vocal"

== Covers ==
The Long Island-based ska-punk band Bomb the Music Industry! covered "Gold Soundz" on their 2008 compilation album Others! Others! Volume 1.

American rock band Phish covered the song during a concert at the Star Lake Amphitheatre in Burgettstown, Pennsylvania on July 21, 1999.

== Charts ==
Chart (1994)	Peak position
UK Singles (Official Charts)	83
