= Preston School of Industry =

Former reform school in California, US

- Preston Castle
- U.S. National Register of Historic Places
- California Historical Landmark
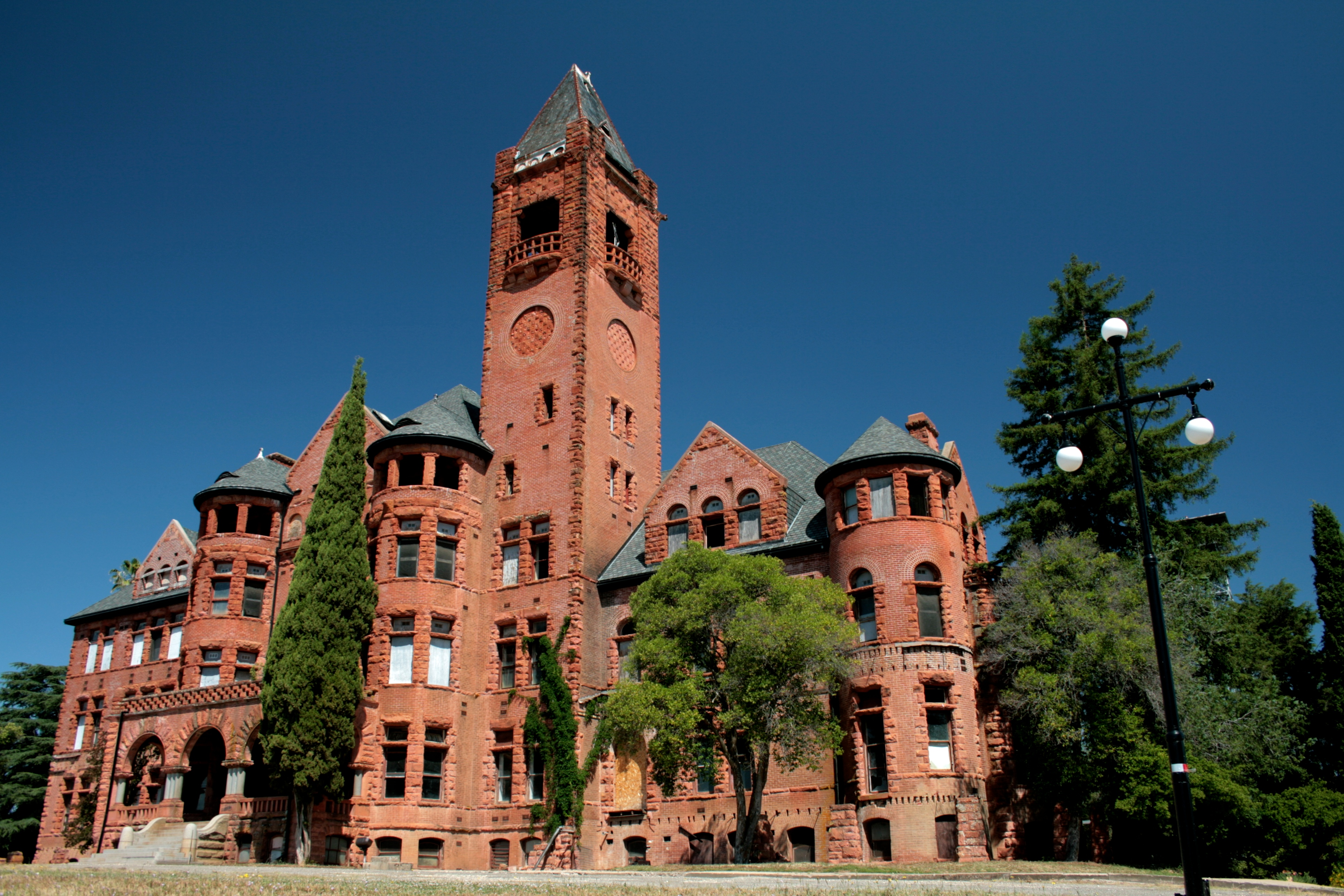

- Location within California Location within the United States
- Nearest city: Ione, California
- Coordinates: 38°21′40″N 120°56′13″W
- Built: 1890
- Architect: Schulze, Henry A.
- Architectural style: Romanesque
- NRHP reference No.: 75000422
- CHISL No.: 867
- Added to NRHP: July 30, 1975

The Preston School of Industry, also known as Preston Castle, was a reform school located in Ione, California, in Amador County. It was proposed by, and ultimately named after, state senator Edward Myers Preston. The cornerstone was laid in December 1890, and the institution was opened in June 1894 when seven wards (minors under the guardianship of the state, but not necessarily juvenile offenders) were transferred there from San Quentin State Prison. It is considered one of the oldest and best-known reform schools in the United States.

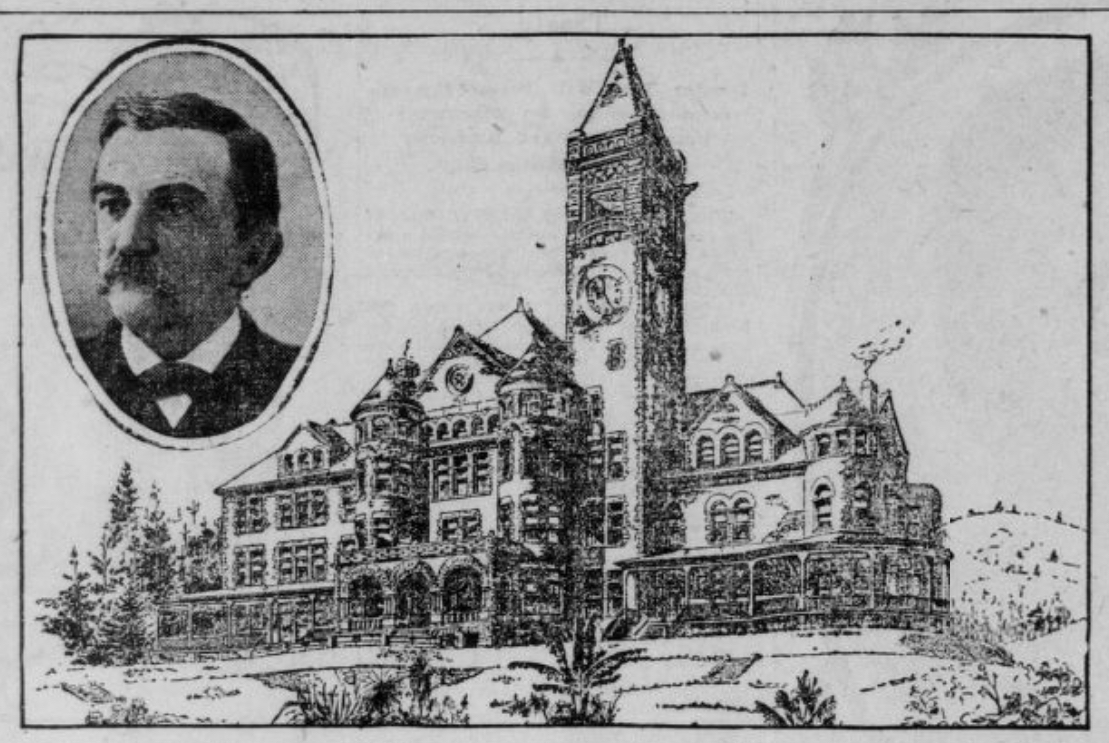
Preston School and Director C.B. Riddick in 1900

The original building, known colloquially as "Preston Castle" (or simply "The Castle"), is the most significant example of Romanesque Revival architecture in the Mother Lode. This building was vacated in 1960, shortly after new buildings had been constructed to replace it, and has since been named a California Historical Landmark (#867), and listed on the National Register of Historic Places (NPS-75000422). A National Register listing encompassing most of the historic facility was approved in 2024.

In 1999, the institution's official name, applied to the newer 1960 buildings, was changed to the "Preston Youth Correctional Facility".

In 2010, the California Department of Corrections and Rehabilitation announced that the facility was to close, and a closing ceremony was held on June 2, 2011.

As of 2024, Preston Castle remains in considerable disrepair, and efforts to restore it are underway. The Preston Castle Foundation, which purchased the castle for $1 from the state in 2014, is overseeing the restoration work. It could be many years before Preston Castle is fully restored, and it is estimated that the full cost of repairs could be as much as $45 million.

== In popular culture ==
The school was used as a shooting location (as the "Bleeding Heart Orphanage") for the 1984 comedy film Bad Manners.

The 2014 film A Haunting at Preston Castle is set at the castle and surrounding area, as is the 2019 movie Apparition.

The first episode of season 2 of the TV series Ghost Adventures is about Preston Castle.

Ghost Hunters investigated the castle's paranormal reports in season 6, episode 6.

The facility is the subject of The Lowe Files Season 1, Episode 1: "Haunted Boy's Reformatory".

Preston School of Industry was an American indie rock band formed by Scott Kannberg (a.k.a. Spiral Stairs) in 1999, following the dissolution of his previous band Pavement.

In "The Masked Bandits", an episode of the TV crime drama series Dragnet 1967, a teenage male minor is convicted and sent to The Preston School of Industry.

== Former wards ==
Former Preston wards include:

- Ernest Booth
- Edward Bunker
- Rory Calhoun (Timothy McCown)
- Neal Cassady
- Caryl Chessman
- Eldridge Cleaver
- Joseph Paul Cretzer
- Gerald Armond Gallego
- Ricardo "Pancho" Gonzales
- Merle Haggard
- Brandt "B-Legit" Jones
- Don Jordan
- Eddie Machen
