= Monsoon (Preston School of Industry album) =

Studio album by Preston School of Industry
- Released: February 17, 2004
- Recorded: Seattle, 2003, engineered by Matthew Zeek Harris, mixed by Joe Reineke at Orbit Audio, Seattle
- Genre: Indie rock, alternative rock, alt-country, jangle pop, Paisley Underground, lo-fi
- Length: 37:08
- Label: Domino Records, Matador Records
- Producer: Spiral Stairs

Preston School of Industry chronology
All This Sounds Gas (2001)	Monsoon (2004)

Monsoon is the second and final studio album by American indie rock band Preston School of Industry. It includes guest appearances by Wilco members and Scott McCaughey.

== Critical reception ==
Professional ratings
Aggregate scores
Source	Rating
Metacritic	62/100
Review scores
Source	Rating
AllMusic	3/5 stars
Drowned in Sound	6/10
Pitchfork	5/10
Rolling Stone	3/5 stars
Tiny Mix Tapes	2.5/5

Monsoon received mixed reviews from critics. On Metacritic, the album holds a score of 62/100 based on 21 reviews, indicating "generally favorable reviews".

== Track listing ==
1. "The Furnace Sun"
2. "Walk of a Gurl"
3. "Caught in the Rain"
4. "Line It Up"
5. "So Many Ways"
6. "If the Straits of Magellan Should Ever Run Dry"
7. "Her Estuary Twang"
8. "Escalation Breeds Escalation"
9. "Get Your Crayons Out!"
10. "Tone It Down"

All music & lyrics by Spiral Stairs.

== Personnel ==
- Scott Kannberg - vocals, guitars, harmonica
- Matthew Zeek Harris - drums (1–7, 9)
- Dan Carr - bass guitar (1–4, 7, 9)
- Chris Heinrich - pedal steel guitar (1, 3, 5, 7, 9)
- Lara Scudder - drums (1, 3, 4, 6)
- Scott McCaughey - mandolin (3, 10)
- Jeff Tweedy - skronk guitar (9)
- Leroy Bach - tuba keys, ashtrays (9)
- Glenn Kotche - percussion (9)
- John Stirratt - casiotone (9)
- Chrissy K. - backing vocals (1)
