= All This Sounds Gas =

Studio album by Preston School of Industry
- Released: August 28, 2001
- Genre: Indie rock Alternative rock Jangle pop Paisley Underground
- Label: Matador Records

Preston School of Industry chronology
All This Sounds Gas (2001)	Monsoon (2004)

All This Sounds Gas is the 2001 debut album from Preston School of Industry. Its title is a reference to George Harrison's album All Things Must Pass.

== Reception ==
Professional ratings
Aggregate scores
Source	Rating
Metacritic	72/100
Review scores
Source	Rating
AllMusic	3/5 stars
NME	7/10
Pitchfork	5.3/10

All This Sounds Gas received positive reviews from critics. On Metacritic, the album holds a score of 72/100 based on 13 reviews, indicating "generally favorable reviews".

== Track listing ==
All songs written by Spiral Stairs.

No.	Title	Length
1.	"Whalebones"	3:05
2.	"Falling Away"	3:39
3.	"A Treasure @ Silver Bank (This Dynasty's for Real)"	4:25
4.	"Encyclopedic Knowledge Of"	7:56
5.	"History of the River"	3:15
6.	"Doping for Gold"	4:35
7.	"Solitaire"	3:54
8.	"Blü Sön"	0:43
9.	"Monkey Heart and the Horses' Leg"	4:25
10.	"The Idea of Fires"	2:56
11.	"Take a Stand/All This Sounds Gas"	8:17

Japanese edition bonus tracks
No.	Title	Length
12.	"Walls of Grain"	3:08
13.	"Suddenly Stable"	2:34
14.	"To Squash It for Good"	2:37
15.	"Imperial"	4:02
16.	"Most Common Method"	4:08
17.	"I've Done Nothing Wrong"	4:57

"All This Sounds Gas" is a 1:33 hidden bonus track after nine seconds of silence. The CD opens with a 1:13 pregap track, with 0:30 of silence and a 0:43 collage of music (mostly backwards) that leads directly into the intro of "Whalebones".
