= Watery, Domestic =

EP by Pavement
- Released: November 25, 1992
- Recorded: 1992
- Studio: Louder Than You Think (Stockton, California)
- Genres: Indie rock; noise pop
- Length: 11:27
- Labels: Matador (US); Big Cat (UK)
- Producer: Pavement

Pavement chronology
Slanted and Enchanted (1992)	Watery, Domestic (1992)	Westing (By Musket and Sextant) (1993)

Professional ratings
Review scores
Source	Rating
AllMusic	2.5/5 stars
Christgau's Consumer Guide	A−
Entertainment Weekly	B−
The New Rolling Stone Album Guide	4/5 stars
Spin	1/1 star
Spin Alternative Record Guide	6/10

Watery, Domestic is the fourth EP by American indie rock band Pavement, released on November 25, 1992, through Matador Records. It is the group's final release to feature drummer Gary Young as a member.

== Background and recording ==
The record marked the recording debuts of both Bob Nastanovich and Mark Ibold on percussion and bass respectively. Although both had been touring members for some time, the debut album, Slanted and Enchanted and the preceding EPs had been recorded by a trio of Stephen Malkmus, Spiral Stairs and Gary Young.

All four songs can also be found on Slanted and Enchanted: Luxe & Reduxe, the liner notes to which identify a further 3 songs as having been recorded during the same session. As well as the standard CD and 12" vinyl releases, the record was also available as a 12" picture disc in the UK.

== Artwork and packaging ==
The image of the rooster on the cover was created by defacing the cover of the self-titled album by Ambergris, with the photographic rooster image by Stephen S Myers, American, born 1942. The art direction for the original rooster image was provided by Thom Williams.

Bob Nastanovich revealed on the Discograffiti podcast that the EP's title was a reference to Nastanovich's beer preferences, since his tastes typically went towards low-alcohol American beer brands.

== Legacy ==
"Texas Never Whispers" was sampled by Placebo for their song "Slave to the Wage" from their 2000 album Black Market Music. It was also recorded by Deadsy for their debut demo in 1995.

"Frontwards" has been covered by both Cardiff-based indie-pop band Los Campesinos! and Hamilton Leithauser.

"Shoot the Singer (1 Sick Verse)" is often covered live by Yoni Wolf of the band Why?.

== Track listing ==
All tracks are written by Stephen Malkmus and Scott Kannberg.

No.	Title	Length
1.	"Texas Never Whispers"	3:09
2.	"Frontwards"	3:09
3.	"Feed Em to the (Linden) Lions"	1:55
4.	"Shoot the Singer (1 Sick Verse)"	3:15
Total length:		11:27

== Personnel ==
=== Pavement ===
- Stephen Malkmus – guitar, lead vocals
- Scott Kannberg – guitar, backing vocals
- Gary Young – drums
- Bob Nastanovich – percussion, backing vocals
- Mark Ibold – bass guitar

=== Technical ===
- Thom Williams – art direction
- Stephen Myers – photography
