= Barbicide =

Disinfectant used by barbers and cosmetologists

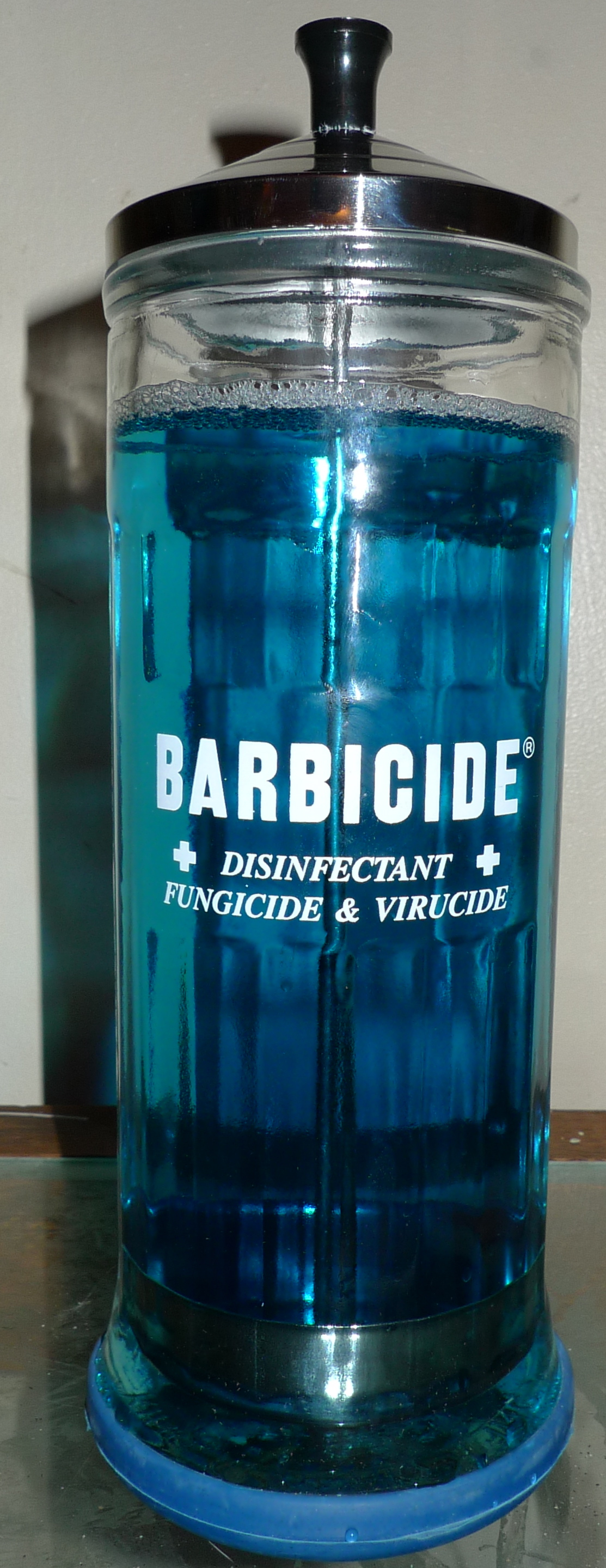

Barbicide is a disinfectant solution used by barbers and cosmetologists for disinfecting grooming tools such as combs and hair-cutting shears. Manufactured by King Research, it was invented in 1947 by Maurice King and marketed heavily around the United States by his brother James.

Barbicide is a United States Environmental Protection Agency–approved combination germicide, pseudomonacide, fungicide, and a viricide effective against HIV-1, hepatitis B, and hepatitis C. Its active ingredient is alkyl dimethyl benzyl ammonium chloride (5.12% by volume); sodium nitrite and blue dye are also present.

Barbicide is sold as a concentrate diluted for use in a ratio of 2 ounces (57 g) of Barbicide concentrate mixed into 32 ounces (910 g) of water, with each stylist having a container for treating their own tools.

At one time, several U.S. states legally required barber shops to use Barbicide and according to the maker, two states continued to in 1997. A jar of Barbicide sits on display in the Smithsonian Institution's National Museum of American History.
