= Preston Castle, Lancashire =

Demolished castle in England

Coordinates: 53.765°N 2.729°W

Preston Castle, or Tulketh Castle, was a motte and bailey castle in the Ashton-on-Ribble district of Preston, Lancashire, England.

The site became disused at an early stage but the mound was not leveled until 1855.
