= Perfect Sound Forever (EP) =

EP by Pavement
- Released: April 15, 1991
- Recorded: December 29–30, 1989
- Studio: Louder Than You Think Studios (Stockton, California)
- Genre: Indie rock, lo-fi, noise pop
- Length: 11:12
- Label: Drag City
- Producer: Gary Young

Pavement chronology
Demolition Plot J-7 (1990)	Perfect Sound Forever (1991)	Slanted and Enchanted (1992)

Professional ratings
Review scores
Source	Rating
Allmusic	3/5 stars
The Encyclopedia of Popular Music	3/5 stars
Spin Alternative Record Guide	9/10
The Village Voice	A−

Perfect Sound Forever is the third EP by American indie rock band Pavement, released on April 15, 1991 through Drag City. It was released as a 10" on Chicago's Drag City recording label. Its songs were later made available on the Drag City compilation Westing (by Musket & Sextant).

== Background and recording ==
The EP was recorded over the course of two days at Louder Than You Think Studios in Stockton, California, and was self-produced by Pavement's own Gary Young.

The EP's name came from a line in Sony's 1982 advertising campaign for the first compact discs, which assured potential buyers of the ultimate in both fidelity and longevity.

== Style ==
The Village Voice writer Michaelangelo Matos noted Perfect Sound Forever and the band's 1990 EP, Demolition Plot J-7, as "epochal to ... sloppy early-'90s undergrads."

== Track listing ==
All tracks were written by Stephen Malkmus and Scott Kannberg.

No.	Title	Length
1.	"Heckler Spray"	1:06
2.	"From Now On"	2:03
3.	"Angel Carver Blues/Mellow Jazz Docent"	2:30
4.	"Drive-by Fader"	0:28
5.	"Debris Slide"	1:56
6.	"Home"	2:23
7.	"Krell Vid-User"	1:26

== Personnel ==
=== Pavement ===
- Stephen Malkmus – lead vocals, guitar
- Scott Kannberg – backing vocals, guitar, bass
- Gary Young – drums
