= Goodbye to the Edge City =

EP by Preston School of Industry
- Released: June 11, 2001
- Genre: Indie rock Alternative rock Jangle pop
- Label: Amazing Grease Records

Professional ratings
Review scores
Source	Rating
Pitchfork	6.8/10

Goodbye to the Edge City is the debut EP from Preston School of Industry, released in 2001.

== Critical reception ==
Trouser Press wrote that "the five songs are half-baked, with few stylistic surprises aside from the horn section and children’s backing vocals that grace the goofy 'Something Always Happens.'"

== Track listing ==
1. "Somethings Happen Always"
2. "How to Impress the Goddess pt2"
3. "The Spaces In Between"
4. "Where You Gonna Go?"
5. "Goodbye to the Edge City"
