= Gary Young (drummer) =

American musician and music producer (1953–2023)

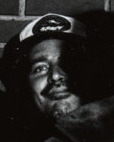
- Young in 1993

Background information
- Also known as: Plantman
- Born: Garrit Allan Robertson Young; May 3, 1953; Mamaroneck, New York, U.S.
- Origin: Stockton, California, U.S.
- Died: August 17, 2023 (aged 70) Stockton, California, U.S.
- Genres: Indie rock; folk; punk rock
- Instruments: Vocals; drums; keyboards
- Years active: 1984–2023
- Labels: Matador; Domino; Big Cat
- Formerly of: Pavement; Gary Young's Hospital

Garrit Allan Robertson Young (May 3, 1953 – August 17, 2023) was an American musician and music producer. He was best known as the original drummer of the indie rock band Pavement from its inception in 1989 until his departure in 1993.

== Early life ==
Young was born in Mamaroneck, New York on May 3, 1953. His father, Bob Young, was an engineer in the plastics business with deep knowledge of carbon fiber. He worked with Ned Steinberger in the development of the construction of his electric bass for the Steinberger company.

== Career ==
=== Early career: 1984–1989 ===
In the 1980s, Young booked musical acts to play around Stockton, including Dead Kennedys, Circle Jerks and Black Flag. Early in the decade, he played in the punk band The Fall of Christianity with Brian Thalken of The Authorities.

=== Pavement: 1989–1993; 2010 ===
Stephen Malkmus and Scott Kannberg formed Pavement in Stockton, California in 1989. Their first EP, Slay Tracks (1933-1969), was recorded at Young's Louder Than You Think Studio with Young contributing drums. Young would also appear on their next two EPs, Demolition Plot J-7, and Perfect Sound Forever, released in 1990 and 1991, respectively, as well as their 1992 debut album, Slanted and Enchanted. Young began gaining the band a degree of notoriety with his on- and offstage antics. He was noted for greeting the audience at the door, giving out vegetables, such as cabbage, to fans, and for doing headstands.

His last release as a member of the group was the EP Watery, Domestic. He later appeared on two tracks on the Major Leagues EP as a producer.

Young was fired from Pavement in 1993 due to conflicts with Malkmus and the rest of the band. He reunited with the band to play two shows in 2010.

=== Later career: 1993–2023 ===
After leaving Pavement, Young released three albums, Hospital, Things We Do for You, and The Grey Album under the name Gary Young's Hospital. The music video for the song "Plant Man" was featured in the Beavis and Butthead Season 5 episode "Skin Trade." In 2016, he collaborated with recording engineer Richard Selleseth on the album Malfunction.

Young also developed and patented the Universal Shock Mount used for microphones. Making them each individually himself, he sold more than 13,000 units to distributors and online.

Young was ranked #42 of the 50 Greatest Rock Drummers by Stylus Magazine.

In 2023, he starred in a documentary about his own life and career made by Jed I. Rosenberg and titled Louder Than You Think. The film had its world premiere at South by Southwest on March 13, 2023 and received critical acclaim, winning the "Audience Award"; Alan French of Sunshine State Cineplex called it "illuminating and nostalgic," and Serena Seghedoni of Loud and Clear Reviews called it "compelling."

== Personal life and death ==
Young struggled with alcohol, which often affected his live performances and behavior during his tenure with Pavement.

Young died at home in Stockton on August 17, 2023, at age 70.

== Discography ==
=== With Pavement ===
==== Studio albums ====
- Slanted and Enchanted (1992)

==== EPs ====
- Slay Tracks: 1933–1969 (1989)
- Demolition Plot J-7 (1990)
- Perfect Sound Forever (1991)
- Watery, Domestic (1992)

=== With Gary Young's Hospital ===
- Hospital (1994)
- Things We Do for You (1999)
- The Grey Album (2004)

=== Solo albums ===
- Malfunction (2016)
