= Preston School of Industry (band) =

- Origin: Stockton, California, United States
- Genres: Indie rock; alternative rock; jangle pop; paisley underground; alternative country; lo-fi
- Years active: 1999–2004 (on hiatus)
- Labels: Matador; Domino

Preston School of Industry was an American indie rock band formed by Scott Kannberg (a.k.a. Spiral Stairs) in 1999, following the dissolution of his previous band, Pavement. Its name is taken from the well-known US reform school of the same name, Preston School of Industry in Ione, California.

The band's earliest studio release was a cover of Phish's "Axilla II" for the charity tribute album Sharin' in the Groove. In 2001, Preston School of Industry released All This Sounds Gas. The band released its second album, Monsoon, in 2004, with studio contributions from members of The Minus 5 and Wilco.

Preston School of Industry went inactive after their September 2004 Australian tour, though Kannberg revealed in late 2006 he had been slowly working on a record: "Don't know when it's going to be released. Just taking my time, nothing special. I've got the songs, I just haven't figured out how I want to do it yet. This winter, I'll probably get it done." However, in 2009, Kannberg released a solo album under the name Spiral Stairs.

== Discography ==
- All This Sounds Gas – 2001
- Goodbye to the Edge City EP – 2001
- Monsoon – 2004
