= Slanted and Enchanted =

Studio album by Pavement
- Released: April 20, 1992
- Recorded: December 24, 1990; January 13–20, 1991
- Studios: Louder Than You Think, Stockton, California; South Makepeace, Brooklyn, New York
- Genres: Indie rock; lo-fi; noise pop; post-punk
- Length: 39:01
- Label: Matador
- Producer: Pavement

Pavement chronology
Perfect Sound Forever (1991)	Slanted and Enchanted (1992)	Watery, Domestic (1992)

Pavement studio album chronology
Slanted and Enchanted (1992)	Crooked Rain, Crooked Rain (1994)

Singles from Slanted and Enchanted
- 1. "Summer Babe" Released: August 23, 1991 (EP); 2. "Trigger Cut" Released: August 14, 1992

Slanted and Enchanted is the debut studio album by American indie rock band Pavement, released on April 20, 1992, by Matador Records. It is the only Pavement album to feature drummer Gary Young.

The title Slanted and Enchanted is taken from the title of a cartoon made by the band’s friend David Berman. Its cover art was created by appropriating that of an existing album, Ferrante & Teicher's Keyboard Kapers.

The album received critical acclaim and is seen as a landmark for indie rock, with Rolling Stone ranking it 199th on its 2020 edition of "The 500 Greatest Albums of All Time". As of 2007, the album had sold 150,000 copies. In 2022, Alex Ross Perry adapted the album into a rock opera titled Slanted! Enchanted!

== Background and recording ==
Slanted and Enchanted was recorded at the home recording studio of Pavement drummer Gary Young on what was described as a "tight budget" over a span of ten days. The process was said to have been "relaxed."

Stephen Malkmus recorded playing a Fender Stratocaster, and Scott Kannberg recorded with a Fender Mustang and a Gibson SG. Kannberg played through a Fender Silverface Twin Reverb amplifier, and Malkmus played through a small boutique Epiphone amplifier that was borrowed from the father of one of his friends. They used ProCo TurboRat and Boss DS-1 distortion pedals.

Slanted and Enchanted was distributed to critics as early as 1991, months before its official release; the original distribution did not feature the entire band, as several members joined during its production. The recording sessions were split between South Makepeace Studios in Brooklyn, New York (recorded December 24, 1990) and Louder Than You Think Studios in Stockton, California (recorded January 13–20, 1991).

== Release history ==
The album's first single, "Summer Babe", appeared in August 1991. It was Pavement's last release of new material for the Chicago-based Drag City label before the band moved to Matador Records. The single contained the B-sides "Mercy Snack (The Laundromat)" and "Baptist Blacktick" that were included on Japanese versions in the CD, and later on the deluxe version of the album. A different mix of "Summer Babe" entitled "Summer Babe (Winter Version)" became the first track on the album. The song would go on to be ranked by Rolling Stone magazine as number 286 in its 2004 list of the 500 greatest songs of all time, and as number 292 in the 2011 update of the list.

The album's second single, "Trigger Cut", was first released in the UK by Big Cat Records on July 13, 1992, before appearing in the US market through Matador the following month.

Slanted and Enchanted was officially released on April 20, 1992, to critical acclaim, originally reaching a peak of number 72 on the UK Albums Chart. As of 2007, the album had sold 150,000 copies.

In 2002, Matador Records released Slanted and Enchanted: Luxe & Reduxe, a compilation containing Slanted and Enchanted in its entirety, as well outtakes and other rarities from the same era. Matador released Luxe & Reduxe on October 20, 2002, alongside the Slow Century DVD. It features 48 songs, including the entire original disc and, in addition, 3 outtakes of which one is an unreleased song and the other two are alternate takes, plus the B-sides from the "Summer Babe" and "Trigger Cut" singles, 5 songs from two different John Peel sessions, the 4-track EP Watery, Domestic, and 13 tracks of a live performance of the band held at the Brixton Academy in London on December 14, 1992.

Luxe & Reduxe reached number 5 on the US Billboard Top Independent Albums chart and number 152 on the US Billboard 200.

== Music and lyrics ==
Slanted and Enchanted is noted for its "stripped down" sound and heavy use of distortion. Andy Price of Guitar.com described the album's sound as an "aural mess of dishevelled guitar noise, balanced by infectious hooks and a homemade aesthetic," and as a "combination of unkempt, dissonant chord structures, tangled, grubby riffs, tuneful, vibrant melodies and coolly delivered (but earnestly intelligent) lyrics." Erik Davis of Spin wrote, "the distortion doesn't come from a can, nor is it 'texture' or 'noise.' It's a living thing, snaking through the strumming guitars." The original Pavement EPs were recorded without the presence of bass guitar. Some tracks on Slanted and Enchanted, such as "Summer Babe", were recorded with bass, while others, such as "Fame Throwa", have detuned guitars substituting for bass guitar. Songs such as "Here" are said to be "entirely bass-free."

Malkmus began to explore alternate guitar tunings, including different variations of Open D and Open G, which have since been dubbed "slacker tunings" due to their appearance on the album. Malkmus explained, "We didn't have a bass guitar on the early recordings. So tuning down gave us a lower sound but also a fullness to the sound. That's where I started. Then I simplified even more by bringing my G string up to A. I did a lot of things like that." The tracks "In The Mouth a Desert", "Loretta's Scars" and "Jackals, False Grails: The Lonesome Era" are played in CGDGBE tuning. The tracks "Perfume-V", "Summer Babe" and "Conduit for Sale!" use DADABE tuning.

In addition to guitar distortion, feedback and noise, the album makes use of hooks that are consistent with those heard in pop songs. According to Price, "Though uninhibited experimentation was central to Pavement, the bubbling pop hooks that flowed throughout the record's run-time served to anchor the ears. The dissonant chords which shape the captivating 'In the Mouth a Desert' lead us into a fine example, as growling distortion hovers over the verse, snakey hooks periodically rise to have their moment in the sun, before receding into a wash of sound." According to Stephen Thomas Erlewine of AllMusic, "Listening to Slanted & Enchanted is like listening to a college radio station that you can barely tune in—melodies are interrupted by shards of white noise, only to have a simple hook pull everything back into focus." Davis assessed, "There's something like the interstellar space noise picked up on shortwave radios. Some songs start off dope, then get raw power, while others open like thunder and then slip down a velvety slide." The sounds of the guitars have been described as "fuzzy [and] noisy". The album's opening track "Summer Babe (Winter Version)" has been stylistically described as dream pop. Malkmus' vocals are described as "languid". Davis described the album's sound as consisting of "slapdash drums, bells, catchy choruses, sha-la-la-las, guitars played so loose and confident they're almost smiling at you." The album has been noted for its stream of consciousness lyrical style.

== Critical reception and legacy ==
Professional ratings
Review scores
Source	Rating
AllMusic	5/5 stars
Entertainment Weekly	A−
NME	8/10
Pitchfork	10/10
Q	4/5 stars
The Rolling Stone Album Guide	5/5 stars
Select	4/5
Spin	5/5 stars
Spin Alternative Record Guide	10/10
The Village Voice	A

Slanted and Enchanted received critical acclaim. In a contemporary review of the album, Robert Christgau of The Village Voice was highly positive, writing that Pavement are "always good at both tune and noise" and that the music on Slanted and Enchanted yields "a message complex enough to offer hope ... that the lyrics will catch up". In Spin, Erik Davis designated Slanted and Enchanted as the magazine's "Platter du Jour" for March 1992, describing the album as "so fine it occasionally seems too perfect." Steve Lamacq of NME called it "a marvellous piece of lazy rock'n'roll that does for the current American new wave what Teenage Fanclub's A Catholic Education did for British guitar music."

I think Slanted and Enchanted probably is the best record we made, only because it's less self-conscious and has an unrepeatable energy about it.

— Stephen Malkmus

Since its release, Slanted and Enchanted has appeared on many critics' best-of lists and is frequently cited as being among the most influential indie rock albums of the 1990s. In a retrospective review for AllMusic, Stephen Thomas Erlewine cited the album as "a left-field classic" and "one of the most influential records of the '90s". He praised the album's songwriting, and closed his review saying: "Some listeners may initially find the lo-fi sound of the record inaccessible, but the sheer strength of Pavement's songs settles in after a few plays." In 2002, Pitchfork awarded the album their maximum grade of 10.0/10.0 in a review of the album's reissue, and in 2003, the website ranked it as the fifth greatest album of the 1990s. Rolling Stone called Slanted and Enchanted "the quintessential indie rock album" and placed the record on its list of the 500 greatest albums of all time.

Slanted and Enchanted was included in the 2014 reference book Gimme Indie Rock by music journalist Andrew Earles. He wrote: "The 1992 release of Pavement's proper full-length debut did not result in the permanent transformation of the musical landscape across the entire underground-to-mainstream spectrum the way Nirvana's Nevermind did that same year. But Slanted and Enchanted was responsible for a kind of miniature variation of that same kind of change, when viewed from an indie rock perspective. [...] Slanted and Enchanted is such an excellent album that that it begat a sort of cure, generating unrealistic expectations of the band that created the record, while producing many would-be clones of that same band." In 2017, Billboard called it a "slacker masterpiece" and "the definitive indie rock album."

Andy Price wrote for Guitar.com in 2021: "Slanted and Enchanted was a felicitous moment-seizer. And one which prescribed the DIY ethos of independent music for decades to come." Mike Powell of Pitchfork said in 2022: "Pavement weren't the only early-'90s band that turned noise into something like pop—Nirvana and Sonic Youth did the same—but the low-key charm of Slanted and Enchanted felt different. Whatever angst they might've felt was sublimated by a bookishness and sense of grandeur that made even their feedback seem sweet. [...] To gentle hearts inspired by punk's freedom but wigged out by its intensity, they served as proof that not every revolution demands a fight."

=== Accolades ===
(*) designates unordered lists.

Publication	Country	Accolade	Year	Rank
Blender	US	The 100 Greatest American Albums of All time	2002	67
Blender	US	500 CDs You Must Own Before You Die	2003	*
Blender	US	The 10 Greatest Indie-Rock Albums Ever	2007	1
Pitchfork	US	Top 100 Albums of the 1990s	1999	3
Pitchfork	US	Top 100 Albums of the 1990s	2003	5
Pitchfork	US	The 150 Best Albums of the 1990s	2022	70
Rolling Stone	US	The Essential Rock Collection	1997	*
Rolling Stone	US	The Essential Recordings of the '90s	1999	*
Rolling Stone	US	The 500 Greatest Albums of All Time	2012	135
Rolling Stone	US	The 500 Greatest Albums of All Time	2020	199
Rolling Stone	US	The 100 Best Debut Albums of All Time	2013	25
Rolling Stone	US	100 Best Albums of the Nineties	2010	24
Slant Magazine	US	Best Albums of the '90s	2011	40
Spin	US	Top 100 Alternative Albums	1995	16
Spin	US	The 90 Greatest Albums of the '90s	1999	5
Spin	US	Top 100 Albums of the Last 20 Years	2005	4
Spin	US	125 Best Albums of the Past 25 Years	2010	9

== Track listing ==
=== Original 1992 Version ===
All tracks are written by Stephen Malkmus and Scott Kannberg except where noted.

No.	Title	Length
1.	"Summer Babe (Winter Version)"	3:16
2.	"Trigger Cut / Wounded-Kite at :17"	3:16
3.	"No Life Singed Her"	2:09
4.	"In the Mouth a Desert"	3:52
5.	"Conduit for Sale!"	2:52
6.	"Zurich Is Stained"	1:41
7.	"Chesley's Little Wrists"	1:16
8.	"Loretta's Scars"	2:55
9.	"Here"	3:56
10.	"Two States"	1:47
11.	"Perfume-V"	2:09
12.	"Fame Throwa"	3:22
13.	"Jackals, False Grails: The Lonesome Era"	3:21
14.	"Our Singer"	3:09
Total length:		39:01

=== Slanted and Enchanted: Luxe & Reduxe (2002) ===
Disc One - Slanted & Enchanted

No.	Title	Source	Length
1.	"Summer Babe (Winter Version)"	Slanted & Enchanted	3:16
2.	"Trigger Cut/Wounded-Kite at :17"	Slanted & Enchanted	3:17
3.	"No Life Singed Her"	Slanted & Enchanted	2:09
4.	"In the Mouth a Desert"	Slanted & Enchanted	3:52
5.	"Conduit for Sale!"	Slanted & Enchanted	2:52
6.	"Zürich Is Stained"	Slanted & Enchanted	1:41
7.	"Chesley's Little Wrists"	Slanted & Enchanted	1:16
8.	"Loretta's Scars"	Slanted & Enchanted	2:55
9.	"Here"	Slanted & Enchanted	3:56
10.	"Two States"	Slanted & Enchanted	1:47
11.	"Perfume-V"	Slanted & Enchanted	2:10
12.	"Fame Throwa"	Slanted & Enchanted	3:22
13.	"Jackals, False Grails: The Lonesome Era"	Slanted & Enchanted	3:22
14.	"Our Singer"	Slanted & Enchanted	3:12
15.	"Summer Baby (7" Version)"	Slanted Sessions (Summer Babe 7")	3:14
16.	"Mercy Snack: The Laundromat"	Slanted Sessions (Summer Babe 7")	1:39
17.	"Baptist Blacktick"	Slanted Sessions (Summer Babe 7")	2:05
18.	"My First Mine"	Slanted Sessions (Us / My First Mine)	2:22
19.	"Here (Alternate Mix)"	Slanted Sessions (Previously Unreleased)	3:58
20.	"Nothing Ever Happens"	Slanted Sessions (Previously Unreleased)	2:31
21.	"Circa 1762"	John Peel Session #1 (Previously Unreleased)	3:27
22.	"Kentucky Cocktail"	John Peel Session #1 (Previously Unreleased)	3:34
23.	"Secret Knowledge of Backroads"	John Peel Session #1 (Previously Unreleased)	3:27
24.	"Here"	John Peel Session #1 (Previously Unreleased)	3:49

Disc Two - Watery, Domestic

No.	Title	Source	Length
1.	"Texas Never Whispers"	Watery, Domestic	3:09
2.	"Frontwards"	Watery, Domestic	3:16
3.	"Lions (Linden)"	Watery, Domestic	1:50
4.	"Shoot the Singer (1 Sick Verse)"	Watery, Domestic	3:15
5.	"Sue Me Jack"	Watery Sessions (Trigger Cut Plus Two)	3:01
6.	"So Stark (You're a Skyscraper)"	Watery Sessions (Trigger Cut Plus Two)	3:01
7.	"Greenlander"	Watery Sessions (Volume 4)	3:11
8.	"Rain Ammunition"	John Peel Session #2 (Previously Unreleased)	3:25
9.	"Drunks With Guns"	John Peel Session #2 (Previously Unreleased)	1:42
10.	"Ed Ames"	John Peel Session #2 (Previously Unreleased)	3:22
11.	"The List of Dorms"	John Peel Session #2 (Previously Unreleased)	2:26
12.	"Conduit for Sale"	Live Brixton Academy, London, Dec. 14, 1992 (Previously Unreleased)	3:10
13.	"Fame Throwa"	Live Brixton Academy, London, Dec. 14, 1992 (Previously Unreleased)	2:33
14.	"Home"	Live Brixton Academy, London, Dec. 14, 1992 (Previously Unreleased)	3:15
15.	"Perfume-V"	Live Brixton Academy, London, Dec. 14, 1992 (Previously Unreleased)	2:14
16.	"Summer Babe"	Live Brixton Academy, London, Dec. 14, 1992 (Previously Unreleased)	3:21
17.	"Frontwards"	Live Brixton Academy, London, Dec. 14, 1992 (Previously Unreleased)	3:18
18.	"Angel Carver Blues / Mellow Jazz Docent"	Live Brixton Academy, London, Dec. 14, 1992 (Previously Unreleased)	3:02
19.	"Two States"	Live Brixton Academy, London, Dec. 14, 1992 (Previously Unreleased)	1:55
20.	"No Life Singed Her"	Live Brixton Academy, London, Dec. 14, 1992 (Previously Unreleased)	1:45
21.	"So Stark"	Live Brixton Academy, London, Dec. 14, 1992 (Previously Unreleased)	3:56
22.	"Box Elder"	Live Brixton Academy, London, Dec. 14, 1992 (Previously Unreleased)	2:45
23.	"Baby Yeah"	Live Brixton Academy, London, Dec. 14, 1992 (Previously Unreleased)	2:45
24.	"In the Mouth a Desert"	Live Brixton Academy, London, Dec. 14, 1992 (Previously Unreleased)	4:00

== Personnel ==
Pavement

- Stephen Malkmus – lead vocals, lead and rhythm guitar
- Scott Kannberg – bass guitar, lead and rhythm guitar, backing vocals (tracks 1–2, 4–5), lead vocals (track 10)
- Gary Young – drums

Additional personnel

- Cy Jameson – engineering (track 9)

== Charts ==
Chart (1992–1993)	Peak position
Australian Albums (ARIA)	178
UK Albums (Official Charts)	72
