= Scott Kannberg =

American songwriter

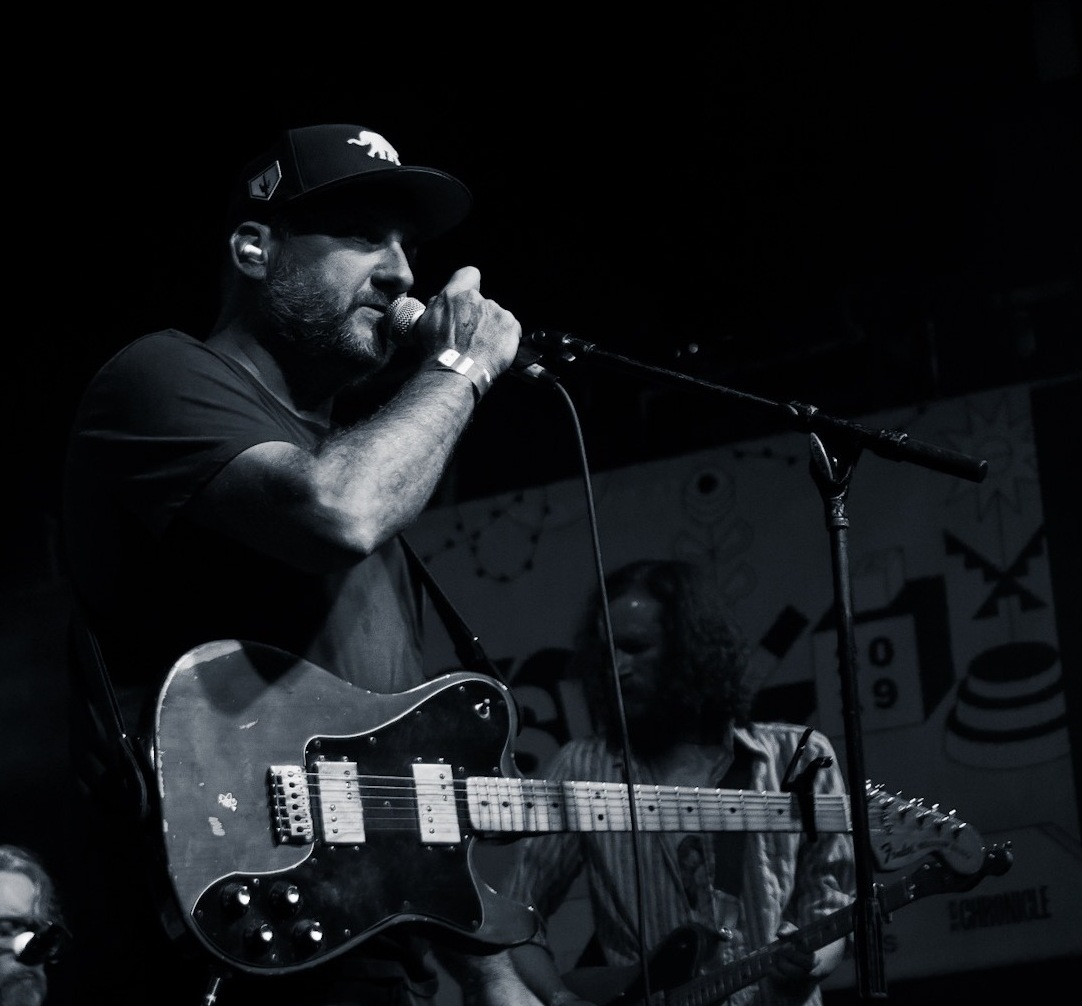
- Kannberg in 2019

Background information
- Also known as: Spiral Stairs
- Born: Christopher Scott Kannberg; August 30, 1966 (age 59); Stockton, California
- Genres: Indie rock
- Instruments: Vocals; guitar; bass
- Years active: 1989-present
- Labels: Matador; Domino; Drag City; Amazing Grease Records
- Website: Official website

Christopher Scott Kannberg (born August 30, 1966), known professionally as Scott Kannberg and Spiral Stairs, is an American musician best known for being a founding member of the indie-rock band Pavement serving as guitarist and occasional lead vocalist. He also headed the band Preston School of Industry, and has been a solo artist.

== Career ==
Kannberg was a childhood friend of Stephen Malkmus, both of them growing up in Stockton, California. Together they would form the band Pavement under the pseudonyms "Spiral Stairs" and "SM", respectively. Kannberg wrote and sang lead vocals on several Pavement songs, including "Painted Soldiers", "Hit the Plane Down", "Kennel District", "Date With IKEA", and "Passat Dream".

In 1999, he founded Amazing Grease Records with Mike Drake of Oranger. After Pavement disbanded he formed a new band called Preston School of Industry on Matador Records. The band released an EP and two albums, but became inactive in 2004. He released his first solo album in 2009.

== Discography ==
=== With Preston School of Industry ===
==== EPs ====
- Goodbye to the Edge City (EP) (2001)

==== Studio albums ====
- All This Sounds Gas (2001)
- Monsoon (2004)

=== Solo (as Spiral Stairs) ===
- The Real Feel (2009)
- Doris & the Daggers (2017)
- We Wanna Be Hyp-No-Tized (2019)
- Medley Attack!!! (2022)
