= List of songs recorded by Elliott Smith =

Between his earliest known recordings in 1983 to his death in 2003, Elliott Smith wrote and recorded hundreds of songs for both bands and his solo releases.

== Solo songs ==
Year	Title	Co-writer(s)	Release
1994	"Roman Candle"	n/a	Roman Candle
1994	"Condor Avenue"	n/a	Roman Candle
1994	"No Name #1"	J.J. Gonson	Roman Candle
1994	"No Name #2"	n/a	Roman Candle
1994	"No Name #3"	n/a	Roman Candle
1994	"Drive All Over Town"	n/a	Roman Candle
1994	"No Name #4"	n/a	Roman Candle
1994	"Last Call"	n/a	Roman Candle
1994	"Kiwi Maddog 20/20"	n/a	Roman Candle
1994	"Shytown"	Pete Krebs	"Shytown" / "No Confidence Man"
1994	"No Confidence Man"	Pete Krebs	"Shytown" / "No Confidence Man"
1994	"Big Decision"	n/a	A Slice of Lemon comp, Elliott Smith Alternate Versions
1994	"Crazy Fucker"	n/a	Elliott Smith reissue
1995	"Needle in the Hay"	n/a	Needle in the Hay, Elliott Smith
1995	"Alphabet Town"	n/a	Neede in the Hay, Elliott Smith
1995	"Some Song"	n/a	Needle in the Hay, Ballad of Big Nothing
1995	"Christian Brothers"	n/a	Elliott Smith
1995	"Clementine"	n/a	Elliott Smith
1995	"Southern Belle"	n/a	Elliott Smith
1995	"Single File"	n/a	Eliott Smith
1995	"Coming Up Roses"	n/a	Elliott Smith
1995	"Satellite"	n/a	Elliott Smith
1995	"St. Ides Heaven"	n/a	Elliott Smith
1995	"Good to Go"	n/a	Elliott Smith
1995	"The White Lady Loves You More"	n/a	Elliott Smith
1995	"The Biggest Lie"	n/a	Elliott Smith
1996	"Speed Trials"	n/a	Speed Trials, Either/Or, Ballad of Big Nothing
1996	"Angeles"	n/a	Speed Trials, Either/Or, Ballad of Big Nothing
1996	"I Don't Think I'm Ever Gonna Figure It Out"	n/a	Speed Trials
1997	"Division Day"	n/a	Division Day single, Either/Or, Ballad of Big Nothing
1997	"No Name #6"	n/a	Division Day single
1997	"Alameda"	n/a	Either/Or
1997	"Ballad of Big Nothing"	n/a	Either/Or, Ballad of Big Nothing
1997	"Between the Bars"	n/a	Either/Or
1997	"Pictures of Me"	n/a	Either/Or
1997	"No Name #5"	n/a	Either/Or
1997	"Rose Parade"	n/a	Either/Or
1997	"Punch and Judy"	n/a	Either/Or
1997	"Cupid's Trick"	n/a	Either/Or
1997	"2:45 AM"	n/a	Either/Or
1997	"Say Yes"	n/a	Either/Or
1997	"Miss Misery"	n/a	Good Will Hunting soundtrack, XO reissue
1997-98	"Cecilia/Amanda"	n/a	Roman Candle 2010 reissue
1998	"Sweet Adeline"	n/a	XO
1998	"Tomorrow Tomorrow"	n/a	XO
1998	"Waltz #2 (XO)"	n/a	XO, Waltz #2 (XO) single
1998	"Baby Britain"	n/a	XO, Baby Britain single
1998	"Pitseleh"	n/a	XO
1998	"Independence Day"	n/a	XO
1998	"Bled White"	n/a	XO
1998	"Waltz #1"	n/a	XO
1998	"Amity"	n/a	XO
1998	"Oh Well, Okay"	n/a	XO
1998	"Bottle Up and Explode!"	n/a	XO
1998	"A Question Mark"	n/a	XO
1998	"Everybody Cares, Everybody Understand"	n/a	XO
1998	"I Didn't Understand"	n/a	XO
1998	"Our Thing"	n/a	Waltz #2 (XO) single
1998	"How to Take a Fall"	n/a	Waltz #2 (XO) single
1998	"The Enemy is You"	n/a	Baby Britain single
1999	"I Can't Answer You Anymore"	n/a	3 Titres Inedits
2000	"Happiness / The Gondola Man"	n/a	Happiness single
2000	"Son of Sam"	n/a	Son of Sam single, Happiness single, Figure 8
2000	"A Living Will"	n/a	Son of Sam single
2000	"Figure 8"	n/a	Son of Sam single, Figure 8
2000	"Somebody That I Used to Know"	n/a	Figure 8
2000	"Junk Bond Trader"	n/a	Figure 8
2000	"Everything Reminds Me of Her"	n/a	Figure 8
2000	"Everything Means Nothing to Me"	n/a	Figure 8
2000	"L.A."	n/a	Figure 8
2000	"In the Lost and Found (Honky Bach) / The Roost"	n/a	Figure 8
2000	"Stupidity Tries"	n/a	Figure 8
2000	"Easy Way Out"	n/a	Figure 8
2000	"Wouldn't Mama Be Proud?"	n/a	Figure 8
2000	"Color Bars"	n/a	Figure 8
2000	"Pretty Mary Kay"	n/a	Figure 8
2000	"Better Be Quiet Now"	n/a	Figure 8
2000	"Can't Make a Sound"	n/a	Figure 8
2000	"Bye"	n/a	Figure 8
2000	"Because"	Lennon/McCartney	Figure 8
2000	"Figure 8"	Bob Dorough	Figure 8
2003	"Pretty (Ugly Before)"	n/a	Pretty (Ugly Before) single, From a Basement on the Hill
2003	"A Distorted Reality Is Now a Neccessity to Be Free"	n/a	Pretty (Ugly Before) single, From a Basement on the Hill
2004	"Coast to Coast"	n/a	From a Basement on the Hill
2004	"Let's Get Lost"	n/a	From a Basement on the Hill
2004	"Don't Go Down"	n/a	From a Basement on the Hill
2004	"Strung Out Again"	n/a	From a Basement on the Hill
2004	"A Fond Farewell"	n/a	From a Basement on the Hill
2004	"King's Crossing"	n/a	From a Basement on the Hill
2004	"Ostrich & Chirping"	n/a	From a Basement on the Hill
2004	"Twilight"	n/a	From a Basement on the Hill
2004	"A Passing Feeling"	n/a	From a Basement on the Hill
2004	"The Last Hour"	n/a	From a Basement on the Hill
2004	"Shooting Star"	n/a	From a Basement on the Hill
2004	"Memory Lane"	n/a	From a Basement on the Hill
2004	"Little One"	n/a	From a Basement on the Hill
2005	"All My Rowdy Friends Have Settled Down"	Hank Williams Jr.	Live at Largo
2005	"Clouds"	Sam Coomes	Live at Largo
2005	"Trouble"	Cat Stevens	Thumbsucker soundtrack
2007	"Angel in the Snow"	n/a	New Moon
2007	"Talking to Mary"	n/a	New Moon
2007	"High Times"	n/a	New Moon
2007	"New Monkey"	n/a	New Moon
2007	"Looking Over My Shoulder"	n/a	New Moon
2007	"Going Nowhere"	n/a	New Moon
2007	"Riot Coming"	n/a	New Moon
2007	"All Cleaned Out"	n/a	New Moon
2007	"First Timer"	n/a	New Moon
2007	"Go By"	n/a	New Moon
2007	"Thirteen"	Alex Chilton, Chris Bell	New Moon
2007	"Georgia, Georgia"	n/a	New Moon
2007	"Whatever (Folk Song In C)"	n/a	New Moon
2007	"Big Decision"	n/a	New Moon
2007	"Placeholder"	n/a	New Moon
2007	"New Disaster"	n/a	New Moon
2007	"Seen How Things Are Hard"	n/a	New Moon
2007	"Fear City"	n/a	New Moon
2007	"Either/Or"	n/a	New Moon
2007	"Almost Over"	n/a	New Moon
2007	"See You Later"	n/a	New Moon
2007	"Half Right"	n/a	New Moon
2016	"Untitled Guitar Finger Picking"	n/a	Heaven Adores You soundtrack
2016	"Untitled Melancholy Song"	n/a	Heaven Adores You soundtrack
2016	"Unknown Song (Instrumental)"	n/a	Heaven Adores You soundtrack
2016	"Unknown (Instrumental)"	n/a	Heaven Adores You soundtrack
2016	"Untitled Soft Song In F"	n/a	Heaven Adores You soundtrack
2016	"True Love"	n/a	Heaven Adores You soundtrack
2016	"I Love My Room"	n/a	Heaven Adores You soundtrack

== Songs for bands ==
=== Stranger Than Fiction songs ===
Many of Smith's songs with Stranger Than Fiction, A Murder of Crowes, and Harum Scarum were co-written with Garrick Duckler or Jason Hornick. Later songs were also co-written by Glynnis Fawkes and Susan Pagani.

Year	Title	Co-writer(s)	Release
1985	"Halfway to Forever (Autumn Signs)"	Duckler, Hornick	Any Kind of Mudhen
1985	"Looking at My Watch"	Duckler, Hornick	Any Kind of Mudhen
1985	"The Machine"	Duckler	Any Kind of Mudhen
1985	"Joy to the World"	n/a	Any Kind of Mudhen
1985	"Uncertainty"	Duckler, Hornick	Any Kind of Mudhen
1985	"Another Letter"	Duckler, Hornick	Any Kind of Mudhen
1985	"It Was a Sunny Day"	Duckler, Hornick	Any Kind of Mudhen
1985	"Wind Through My Life"	Duckler, Hornick	Any Kind of Mudhen
1985	"Pbida"	Duckler, Hornick	Any Kind of Mudhen
1985	"Chemistry"	Duckler, Hornick	Any Kind of Mudhen
1985	"Nothing to Do With You"	Duckler, Hornick	Any Kind of Mudhen, Still Waters More or Less
1985	"Pull Me Through"	Duckler, Hornick	Any Kind of Mudhen
1985	"To Build a Home"	Duckler, Hornick	Any Kind of Mudhen
1986	"Wandering"	Duckler, Hornick, Glynnis Fawkes, Susan Pagani	Still Waters More or Less
1986	"Song to the Great Serpent"	Duckler, Hornick, Fawkes, Pagani	Still Waters More or Less
1986	"Living in Rotational"	Duckler, Hornick, Fawkes, Pagani	Still Waters More or Less
1986	"The Crystal Ball"	Duckler, Hornick, Pagani	Still Waters More or Less
1986	"Freedom of Expression"	Duckler, Hornick, Fawkes, Pagani	Still Waters More or Less
1986	"Instinctual Disjunction"	Duckler, Hornick, Fawkes, Pagani	Still Waters More or Less
1986	"The Vatican Rock"	Duckler, Hornick, Sally Tapanen	Still Waters More or Less
1986	"Jump Across the Mountain"	n/a	Still Waters More or Less
1986	"Tunnel Vision"	Duckler, Hornick	Still Waters More or Less
1986	"Sound to Me"	n/a	Still Waters More or Less
1986	"In the Light"	Duckler, Hornick, Fawkes, Pagani	Still Waters More or Less
1986	"Great Serpent Reprise"	Duckler, Hornick, Fawkes, Pagani	Still Waters More or Less
1986	"Laughter"	Duckler, Hornick, Fawkes, Pagani	Still Waters More or Less
1986	"Time Is Ours Now"	Duckler, Hornick	Waiting for the Second Hand
1986	"Punch and Judy"	Duckler, Hornick	Waiting for the Second Hand
1986	"Ancient Fable"	Duckler, Hornick	Waiting for the Second Hand
1986	"11:37 Passing"	Duckler, Hornick	Waiting for the Second Hand
1986	"I Wish I Could Not Say I Wish"	Duckler, Hornick	Waiting for the Second Hand
1986	"Egypt"	Hornick, Fawkes	Waiting for the Second Hand
1986	"The Roller Coaster to Hell"	Hornick, Pagani	Waiting for the Second Hand
1986	"Little Miss Sally (and her evening meditation)"	Duckler, Hornick, Lisa Gisvold, Sara Harris, Alice Vosmek	Waiting for the Second Hand
1986	"Fast Food"	Duckler, Hornick	Waiting for the Second Hand
1986	"Sophistry"	Duckler, Hornick	Waiting for the Second Hand
1987	"Memorandum"	Unknown	Menagerie
1987	"The Real Estate"	Duckler	Menagerie
1987	"Cypress"	Unknown	Menagerie
1987	"Prom Date"	Unknown	Menagerie
1987	"Don't Give It Up"	Unknown	Menagerie
1987	"The Party"	Unknown	Menagerie
1987	"Say I Do"	Unknown	Menagerie
1987	"Trying to Find My Shadow"	Duckler	Menagerie
1987	"Asleep"	Duckler	Menagerie
1987	"I'mNotOutOfBreathAnymore"	Duckler	Menagerie
1987	"Anatomy"	Unknown	Menagerie
1987	"Chance"	Unknown	Menagerie

=== A Murder of Crowes songs ===
Year	Title	Co-writer(s)	Release	Notes
1988	"Miss Kennedy"	Duckler	The Greenhouse	
1988	"Shotgun"	Duckler	The Greenhouse	
1988	"Dear Eunice"	Duckler	The Greenhouse	
1988	"Back Seat John"	Duckler	The Greenhouse	
1988	"Condor Ave."	n/a	The Greenhouse	Would later be recorded and released as "Condor Avenue" on Roman Candle.
1988	"Take a Fall"	Duckler	The Greenhouse	
1988	"Chinatown"	Duckler, Hornick, Colin Oldham	The Greenhouse	
1988	"Coraliza"	Duckler	The Greenhouse	
1988	"Maritime Blue"	Duckler	The Greenhouse	
1988	"Three"	Duckler	The Greenhouse	Would later be recorded as "King's Crossing", released on From a Basement on a Hill.

=== Harum Scarum songs ===
Year	Title	Co-writer(s)	Release	Notes
1989	"Expectation"	Duckler	Trick of Paris Season	
1989	"Small Talk"	Duckler	Trick of Paris Season	
1989	"Key Biscayne"	Duckler	Trick of Paris Season	
1989	"This Bed"	Duckler, Tony Lash	Trick of Paris Season	Would become unreleased solo song "Blue Moon".
1989	"Catholic"	Duckler, Lash	Trick of Paris Season	Early version of "Everybody Cares, Everybody Understands" from XO.
1989	"Fifteen Minutes"	Duckler	Trick of Paris Season	
1989	"The Real Thing"	Duckler	Trick of Paris Season	
1989	"Slapstick"	Duckler	Trick of Paris Season	
1989	"Clark Bar"	Duckler	Trick of Paris Season	
1989	"Bald Faced Lie"	Duckler	Trick of Paris Season	

=== Heatmiser songs ===
Year	Title	Co-writer(s)	Release
1992	"Lowlife"	n/a	The Music of Heatmiser, Dead Air
1992	"Dirt"	n/a	The Music of Heatmiser
1992	"Mightier Than You"	n/a	The Music of Heatmiser
1993	"Blackout"	n/a	Dead Air
1993	"Stray"	n/a	Dead Air
1993	"Cannibal"	n/a	Dead Air
1994	"Wake"	n/a	Yellow No. 5
1994	"Antonio Carlos Jobim"	n/a	Cop & Speeder
1994	"Bastard John"	n/a	Cop & Speeder
1994	"Busted Lip"	n/a	Cop & Speeder
1994	"Collect to NYC"	n/a	Cop & Speeder
2015	"Hamburgers"	n/a	Heaven Adores You soundtrack
2015	"Plainclothes Man"	n/a	Heaven Adores You soundtrack

=== Other artists ===
Main artist	Year	Title	Release
Mary Lou Lord	1996	"I Figured You Out"	Martian Saints
Quasi	1999	"All the Same"	Field Studies

== Unreleased songs ==
Listed here are songs that are either only available through unofficial releases or aren't available publicly.

Year	Title	Band	Co-writer(s)	Ref.	Notes
1983	"Closer to the Heart"	Steve Pickering/Mark Merrit/Smith	Rush		Recorded during a session with Pickering and Merrit in November or December 1983.
1983-84	"#37"	Solo	n/a		Played at rehearsals with Smith's earliest band.
1984	"Barriers"	Solo	n/a		Two versions exist: one with Elliott on vocals and the other with his girlfriend at the time Kim. Neither are known to be available.
1984	"Ocean"	Solo	n/a		Recorded at Smith's home on a four-track. Made available in the lead-up to the Heaven Adores You movie.
1985	"Carry On Wayward Son"	Unknown	Kerry Livgren		A short clip of a band featuring Smith on drums performing the song began circulating in 2015
1986-91	"Begin the Begin"	Unknown	R.E.M.		Unknown when exactly it may have been recorded or with who. Very little info is known.
1986-91	"ELK"	Unknown	n/a		Very little info is known about this song.
1995	Uncle Tupelo songs	Heatmiser	Uncle Tupelo		Smith purchased an eight-track reel-to-reel in 1995 that he and members of Heatmiser recorded "Uncle Tupelo tunes".
1995-96	"Burned Out, Still Glowing"	Heatmiser/Solo	n/a		Recorded both solo and with Heatmiser during the Mic City Sons sessions.
1996	"Abused"	Solo	n/a		Recorded during the sessions for Either/Or. Was considered for From a Basement on a Hill and is available online.
1997	"Unlucky Charm"	Solo	n/a		Attempted during his performance on WMUC Third Rail Radio in 1997. Studio instrumental is available.
1998	"A Silver Chain"	Solo	n/a		Recorded at Jackpot! Studios prior to the sessions for XO.
1998	"Echo Park"	Solo	n/a		Recorded during the sessions of XO.
1998-2003	"Brand New Game" / "Brand New Day"	Solo	n/a		Attempted multiple times between 1998 and 2003, but was not released.
1998-2003	"Tiny Time Machine" / "Suicide Machine"	solo	n/a		Attempted as "Tiny Time Machine in 1998, then "Suicide Machine" in 2003. One of the last songs Smith worked on before his death.
1999	"Confidence Artist" / "Untitled Song in G #2"	Solo	n/a		Played live in 1999.
1999	"Dancing on the Highway"	Solo	n/a		Recorded during the sessions for Figure 8 in August 1999.
1999	"Place Pigalle"	solo	n/a		Recorded during the sessions for Figure 8.
2000-01	"Confusion" / "I Live in a Cage"	solo	n/a		
2001	"Blue Moon"	Solo	Duckler, Lash		Later version of "This Bed" by Harum Scarum, played once live in 2001.
2003	"Blind Alley"	Solo	n/a		In consideration for From a Basement on a Hill but was not included.
2003	"Concrete Jungle"	Solo	Bob Marley		Demo recorded for a friend's birthday.
Unknown	"I Don't Give a Fuck" / "Where I Get It From"	Solo	n/a		Recorded sometime between 1986 and 1993, as well as in 2003.
