= An Introduction to... Elliott Smith =

Greatest hits album by Elliott Smith
- Released: November 1, 2010
- Recorded: 1993–2003
- Genre: Indie rock; indie folk; indie pop; lo-fi
- Length: 51:56
- Label: Kill Rock Stars (US); Domino (UK)
- Producer: Elliott Smith; Tom Rothrock; Rob Schnapf; Larry Crane

Elliott Smith chronology
New Moon (2007)	An Introduction to... Elliott Smith (2010)

Professional ratings
Aggregate scores
Source	Rating
Metacritic	81/100
Review scores
Source	Rating
AllMusic	4.5/5 stars
Clash	8/10
Drowned in Sound	10/10
Pitchfork	8.8/10
PopMatters	6/10
Tom Hull	B

An Introduction to... Elliott Smith is a posthumous compilation album by American singer-songwriter Elliott Smith, released on November 2, 2010 by Kill Rock Stars in the United States and in the United Kingdom by Domino.

== Background ==
The press release by Kill Rock Stars described the aim of the compilation's assembly and release:

An Introduction To... is, as the title suggests, intended as an introduction to one of the greatest songwriters of our era. We hope this will enable new generations to learn about Elliott's music by providing a pathway for people to delve more deeply into his immensely satisfying catalog.

Larry Crane, Smith's archivist, remixed "Last Call" for this compilation from the 4-track cassette master. "Angel in the Snow" is also a new mix, done later than the version that appears on New Moon. Crane stated "I had used an inferior noise reduction process on New Moon; plus, I now have better tape transfers".

== Track listing ==
All tracks are written by Elliott Smith.

No.	Title	Length
1.	"Ballad of Big Nothing" (originally appeared on Either/Or)	2:48
2.	"Waltz No. 2 (XO)" (originally appeared on XO)	4:39
3.	"Pictures of Me" (originally appeared on Either/Or)	3:47
4.	"The Biggest Lie" (originally appeared on Elliott Smith)	2:41
5.	"Alameda" (originally appeared on Either/Or)	3:45
6.	"Between the Bars" (originally appeared on Either/Or)	2:22
7.	"Needle in the Hay" (originally released as a single; later appeared on Elliott Smith)	4:20
8.	"Last Call" (originally appeared on Roman Candle)	4:39
9.	"Angeles" (originally appeared on Either/Or)	2:56
10.	"Twilight" (originally appeared on From a Basement on the Hill)	4:26
11.	"Pretty (Ugly Before)" (originally released as a single; later appeared on From a Basement on the Hill)	4:45
12.	"Angel in the Snow" (originally appeared on New Moon)	2:38
13.	"Miss Misery" (early version; originally appeared on New Moon)	2:55
14.	"Happiness" (single version; originally released as a single; later appeared on Figure 8 in a slightly altered version)	5:15
Total length:		51:56
