= Snow angel =

Design made in fresh snow

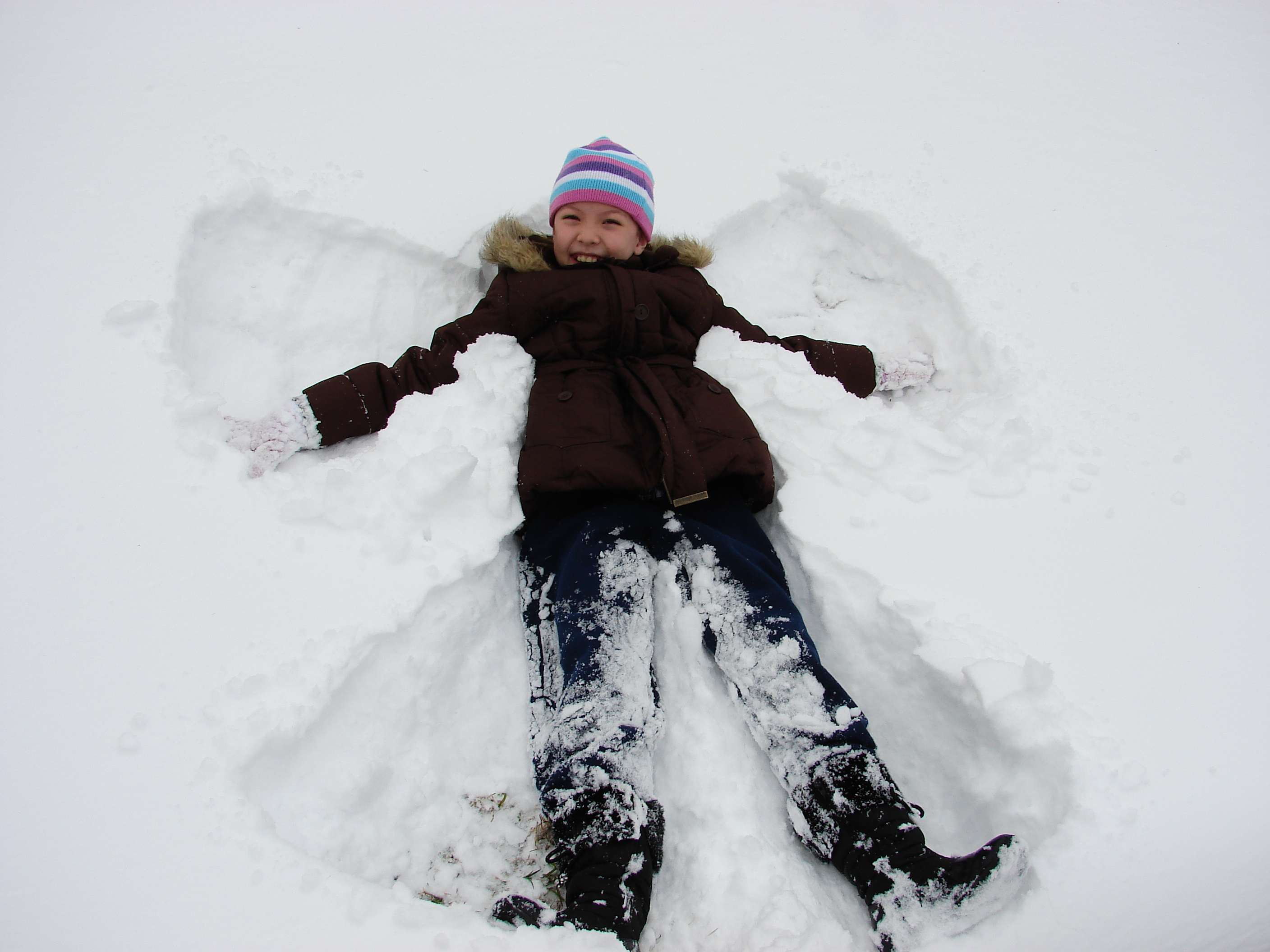
A girl making a snow angel in snow

A snow angel is a design made in fresh snow by lying on one's back and moving one's arms up and down, and one's legs from side to side to form the shape of an angel.

== Technique ==
Creating the snow angel is a simple process. The first step is to find an undisturbed plane of fresh snow. The next step is to lie with arms and legs outstretched on the snow. The limbs are then swept back and forth, creating a trough through the snow. When it is finished, the snow angel should have the appearance of a stylized angel, the movement of the arms having formed wings, and that of the legs having formed a gown. Fresh, light, powdery snow makes the best snow angel rather than heavy, sticky snow.

== Current world record ==
On March 28, 2007, Guinness World Records confirmed that North Dakota holds the world record for the most snow angels created simultaneously in one place. The event occurred on February 17, 2007, when 8,962 snow angels were created by people on the state capitol grounds in Bismarck.

Previously, the record was held by Michigan Technological University with 3,784 students, locals, and alumni making snow angels on the school football field.

== Non-human snow angels ==
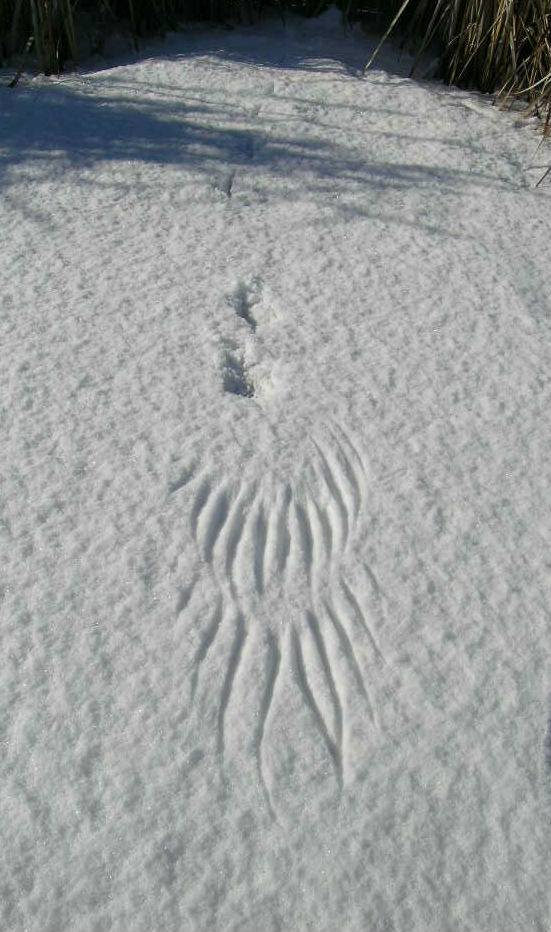
Snow angel left by a pheasant in Montana's Bowdoin National Wildlife Refuge

Some birds (e.g. pheasants) leave on the snow a figure similar to a snow angel. Weddell seals often leave outlines of themselves, similar to a snow angel, melted into the ice; additionally, these seals can thumb their nose at the cold, leaving images called seal shadows.

== In popular culture ==
- Engler i sneen / Angels in the Snow. Norwegian 1989 hit with Jonas Fjeld and Lynni Treekrem. Melody: Jonas Fjeld. Lyrics: Ole Paus, English translation: Eric Anderson.
- In an episode of The Simpsons entitled "Skinner's Sense of Snow", Homer Simpson creates a snow angel, that then turns into a snow devil.
- In the 1970 film Love Story one of the characters played by Ali MacGraw, opposite Ryan O'Neal, creates a snow angel whilst larking about in the snow.
- In Piglet's Big Movie, Winnie-the-Pooh makes a snow angel out of fresh snow.
- Angel in the Snow is an Elliott Smith song, released 4 years postmortem on the album New Moon.
