= The Biggest Lie =

The Biggest Lie may refer to:

- "The Biggest Lie", a song by Hüsker Dü from their 1984 album Zen Arcade
- "The Biggest Lie", a song by Elliott Smith from his 1995 album Elliott Smith
