= New Moon (Elliott Smith album) =

Compilation album by Elliott Smith
- Released: May 8, 2007
- Recorded: 1994–1997
- Genre: Indie folk; indie rock; lo-fi
- Length: 74:22
- Label: Kill Rock Stars
- Producer: Elliott Smith; Larry Crane

Elliott Smith chronology
From a Basement on the Hill (2004)	New Moon (2007)	An Introduction to... Elliott Smith (2010)

New Moon is a posthumous compilation album by American singer-songwriter Elliott Smith, released on May 8, 2007, by Kill Rock Stars. It contains twenty-four previously unreleased songs, most recorded between 1994 and 1997 during the sessions for Smith's albums Elliott Smith and Either/Or.

The album was well received by critics and reached number 24 in the US Billboard chart, selling about 24,000 copies in its first week.

== Background ==
In August 2006, an "excited" employee at Kill Rock Stars made a post on the label's official website stating that an extended version of Either/Or would be released in 2006 to commemorate the record's tenth anniversary. This information was quickly pulled from the website, as the album was in very early planning stages. Eventually, Kill Rock Stars announced that Either/Or: Extended Edition (as it was to be called) had been scrapped in favor of a rarities and unreleased music compilation from Smith's time at the label.

Mixing for the album was done by Larry Crane, the archivist for Smith's estate. The album cover was created by Portland, Oregon artist Mike King, who has produced work for numerous other musicians.

== Track information ==
The selections on New Moon are primarily taken from the sessions of Elliott Smith and Either/Or, with some tracks culled from early XO sessions, and a 1996 radio session.

The mix of the song "New Disaster" was created by digitally combining the vocals from an early take of the song (which suffered from a noise issue with the reel it was recorded onto) with a later, instrumental take of the song. It is noted in the album's liner notes that this was the only song completed in this way.

For the Either/Or record, Smith recorded a song entitled "Pretty Mary K", which is featured on this set. However, after scrapping this song, Smith used the title "Pretty Mary K" for a different song on his Figure 8 album. Later, while recording From a Basement on the Hill, Smith recorded a new version of the former song under the title "Everything's OK". Thus, "Pretty Mary K (Other Version)" on the New Moon set is essentially an early version of "Everything's OK". The original versions of the tracks "See You Later" and "Half Right" are both on the album Mic City Sons by Heatmiser, Smith's old band.

== Release ==
New Moon reached number 16 in the US chart. It sold around 24,000 copies in its first week.

It was awarded a silver certification from the Independent Music Companies Association which indicated sales of at least 30,000 copies throughout Europe.

== Critical reception ==
Professional ratings
Aggregate scores
Source	Rating
Metacritic	85/100
Review scores
Source	Rating
AllMusic	4/5 stars
The A.V. Club	A
Entertainment Weekly	A
The Guardian	4/5 stars
Los Angeles Times	3/4 stars
NME	7/10
Pitchfork	8.7/10
Rolling Stone	4/5 stars
Spin	4/5 stars
Uncut	5/5 stars

New Moon was very well received by critics.

AllMusic wrote, "New Moon [showcases] Smith at his most instinctive and natural".

== Track listing ==
All tracks are written by Elliott Smith, except as noted.

Disc one
No.	Title	Writer(s)	Length
1.	"Angel in the Snow"		2:39
2.	"Talking to Mary"		3:44
3.	"High Times"		3:13
4.	"New Monkey"		3:14
5.	"Looking Over My Shoulder"		3:41
6.	"Going Nowhere"		3:53
7.	"Riot Coming"		3:45
8.	"All Cleaned Out"		2:59
9.	"First Timer"		2:44
10.	"Go By"		3:48
11.	"Miss Misery" (early version)		2:58
12.	"Thirteen" (Big Star cover)	Chris Bell, Alex Chilton	2:43
Total length:			39:21

- Tracks 1–3, 7 recorded during the Elliott Smith sessions.
- Tracks 4–6, 10 recorded during the Either/Or sessions.
- Tracks 8, 9, 11 recorded at Jackpot! Studios in 1997.
- Track 12 taken from a 1996 radio session.

Disc two
No.	Title	Writer(s)	Length
1.	"Georgia, Georgia"		1:48
2.	"Whatever (Folk Song in C)"		2:19
3.	"Big Decision"		2:02
4.	"Placeholder"		2:32
5.	"New Disaster"		4:12
6.	"Seen How Things Are Hard"		3:23
7.	"Fear City"		3:31
8.	"Either/Or"		2:29
9.	"Pretty Mary K" (other version)		3:26
10.	"Almost Over"		2:13
11.	"See You Later"	Neil Gust, Elliott Smith	2:56
12.	"Half Right"	Neil Gust, Elliott Smith	3:50
Total length:			35:01

- Tracks 1–3 recorded during the Elliott Smith sessions.
- Tracks 4–10 recorded during the Either/Or sessions.
- Tracks 11, 12 taken from a 1996 radio session.
