= Plainclothes Man =

Plainclothes Man may refer to

- A police officer wearing Plainclothes
- "Plainclothes Man", a song from the 1996 album Mic City Sons
- Plainclothes Man, a 1932 U.S. movie
- Chelovek v shtatskom ("A Plainclothes Man"), a 1973 Soviet movie
- Plainclothes Man, a character from the T.V. series The X-Files
- The Plainclothesman, a U.S. TV series of the 1950s
