= Elliott Smith (book) =

2007 book about musician Elliott Smith

- Author: Autumn de Wilde
- Cover artist: Autumn de Wilde
- Language: English
- Genre: Music
- Publisher: Chronicle
- Publication date: October 25, 2007
- Publication place: United States
- Media type: Print
- Pages: 224
- ISBN: 978-0-8118-5799-4
- OCLC: 77504364
- Dewey Decimal: 782.42166092 B 22
- LC Class: ML420.S668 W55 2007

Elliott Smith is a book about the musician Elliott Smith that was compiled by photographer Autumn de Wilde. The foreword was written by Beck and Chris Walla. The book was released in November 2007.

== Interviewees ==
Those interviewed for the book include:

- Joanna Bolme, Elliott's ex-girlfriend
- Neil Gust, Smith's friend and former bandmate
- Ashley Welch, Smith's sister
- Beck, musician
- Ben Gibbard and Chris Walla of Death Cab for Cutie
- Matthew Caws of Nada Surf
- Mark Flanagan, owner of Club Largo
- Sam Coomes, Smith's Heatmiser bandmate and bassist during the XO and Figure 8 tours
- Rob Schnapf, co-producer of XO and Figure 8
- Jon Brion, co-producer of Figure 8

== Accompanying CD ==
Included with the book is a five-song CD featuring previously unreleased live recordings of Smith performing acoustically at Club Largo in Los Angeles, CA on April 11, 1998. The track listing is as follows:

1. "Angeles" (2:59)
2. "Between the Bars" (2:27)
3. "Clementine" (2:40)
4. "Clouds" (Quasi cover) (2:29)
5. "All My Rowdy Friends (Have Settled Down)" (Hank Williams Jr. cover) (3:39)
