= Dead Air (album) =

Studio album by Heatmiser
- Released: 1993
- Studios: Sound Impressions, Milwaukie, United States
- Genre: Indie rock
- Length: 37:01
- Label: Frontier
- Producers: Heatmiser, Thee Slayer Hippy

Heatmiser chronology
Dead Air (1993)	Yellow No. 5 (1994)

Dead Air is the debut studio album by American alternative rock band Heatmiser. It was released in 1993 on Frontier Records. The band supported the album with a North American tour.

== Recording ==
Dead Air was recorded at Sound Impressions in Milwaukie, Oregon, and mixed at Whitehorse Studios in Portland, Oregon. According to Tony Lash, the Dead Air versions of "Bottle Rocket" and "Lowlife" reuse the basic tracks from their Music of Heatmiser EP demo counterparts, but feature new vocal and guitar overdubs.

Singer-guitarist Neil Gust has stated that, during the recording of the album, the band was inspired by a wide variety of music, but their choice of gear limited how those their sound was expressed:

I found records that I'd never heard before, in my 20s like Hunky Dory and Funhouse by the Stooges and Marquee Moon, and Cabaret Voltaire and Can’s Tago Mago, it all made us super excited about the idea that you could mix all this stuff up. But Fugazi and the Pixies were just completely the first thing in our faces. And when we moved to Portland, after graduating from college, so it's the end of the spring of 1991, Elliott had bought a Marshall half stack with his like, student loan money. I mean, that pretty much sets up what you sound like. And so I was saving up, it took about a year and a half to save up and buy another Marshall half stack. And once we had those that pretty much sets up that you are a loud fucking rock band. They were 100 watt Marshall half stacks, they're as loud as you can get. And we were super into it. And that's how we made Dead Air.

== Reception ==
Professional ratings
Review scores
Source	Rating
AllMusic	3/5 stars

Trouser Press wrote, "Dead Air is laced with hints of Fugazi, Hüsker Dü, and Helmet, although the record is not nearly as distinctive as any of those bands", describing it as "a textbook example of the strengths and weaknesses of early '90s indie hard rock. Particularly on 'Stray', 'Still' and 'Lowlife', the energy and urgency are enough to rescue the music from the merely generic. But just barely." The Rocket praised the "heavier ... bigger riffs" and "great hooks", noting that "happily there is no sense that [Heatmiser] is trying to recreate the sound of any specific era or band."

== Track listing ==
1. "Still" (Elliott Smith)
2. "Candyland" (Neil Gust)
3. "Mock-Up" (Smith)
4. "Dirt" (Smith)
5. "Bottle Rocket" (Gust)
6. "Blackout" (Smith)
7. "Stray" (Smith)
8. "Can't Be Touched" (Gust)
9. "Cannibal" (Smith)
10. "Don't Look Down" (Gust)
11. "Sands Hotel" (Gust)
12. "Lowlife" (Smith)
13. "Buick" (Gust)
14. "Dead Air" (Smith)

== Personnel ==
Heatmiser

- Neil Gust – vocals, guitar, art direction
- Tony Lash – drums, production, engineering, mixing, art direction
- Brandt Peterson – bass guitar, art direction
- Elliott Smith – vocals, guitar, art direction

Technical

- Steve "Thee Slayer Hippy" Hanford – production
- Bob Stark – recording, engineering assistance
- Super Duper – digital editing
- John Golden – mastering
- J.J. Gonson – photography
- Gustavo del Chucho Bravo – cover photo
