= Cop and Speeder =

Studio album by Heatmiser
- Released: 1994
- Recorded: MusicCraft; City Lights; Whitehorse
- Genres: Alternative rock, indie rock
- Length: 43:38
- Label: Frontier
- Producers: Heatmiser; Thee Slayer Hippy

Heatmiser chronology
Yellow No. 5 (1994)	Cop and Speeder (1994)	Mic City Sons (1996)

Cop and Speeder is the second studio album by American alternative rock band Heatmiser, released in 1994 by record label Frontier.

== Reception ==
Professional ratings
Review scores
Source	Rating
AllMusic	2.5/5 stars
The Encyclopedia of Popular Music	3/5 stars
MusicHound Rock: The Essential Album Guide	3/5 stars

Like its predecessor, Cop and Speeder received generally mixed reviews from critics.

Trouser Press wrote, "Heatmiser attains a powerful sense of mood on Cop and Speeder [...] Thanks to improved songwriting, the album finds the band beginning to emerge from its flat monochrome tones."

== Track listing ==
No.	Title	Writer(s)	Length
1.	"Disappearing Ink"	Neil Gust	2:25
2.	"Bastard John"	Elliott Smith	2:56
3.	"Flame!"	Smith	2:47
4.	"Temper"	Smith	3:32
5.	"Why Did I Decide to Stay?"	Gust	3:01
6.	"Collect to NYC"	Smith	2:54
7.	"Hitting on the Waiter"	Gust	1:54
8.	"Busted Lip"	Smith	3:50
9.	"Antonio Carlos Jobim"	Smith	3:10
10.	"It's Not a Prop"	Gust	3:36
11.	"Something to Lose"	Smith	4:10
12.	"Sleeping Pill"	Gust	3:07
13.	"Trap Door"	Gust	3:21
14.	"Nightcap"	Smith, Garrick Duckler	2:55

== Personnel ==
Heatmiser

- Neil Gust – vocals, guitar, production, packaging, sleeve photography
- Tony Lash – drums, production, engineering, mixing, mastering
- Brandt Peterson – bass guitar
- Elliott Smith – vocals, guitar, production, sleeve photography

Technical

- Bob Stark – additional engineering
- Peter Gries – additional engineering
- Kevin Nettleingham – additional engineering
- Steve "Thee Slayer Hippy" Hanford – co-production
- John Golden – mastering
- J.J. Gonson – sleeve photography
- Kelly O'Mara – sleeve photography
- Peter Hawkinson – technical assistance
