= Jason Hornick =

Medical doctor in Massachusetts, United States

- Education: Keck University of Southern California School of Medicine; Amherst College
- Occupations: Professor, researcher, pathologist
- Years active: 1999–present

Jason Hornick is an American surgical pathologist, Director of Anatomic Pathology, and Director of the Immunohistochemistry Laboratory at Brigham and Women's Hospital. He is a Professor of Pathology at Harvard Medical School.

Hornick was a member of Heatmiser with Elliott Smith.
