= Heaven Adores You =

- Directed by: Nickolas Rossi
- Produced by: Nickolas Rossi; JT Gurzi; Kevin Moyer; Marc Smolowitz
- Starring: Elliott Smith
- Cinematography: Nickolas Rossi; JT Gurzi
- Edited by: Eli Olson; Nickolas Rossi
- Music by: Elliott Smith (songs); Kevin Moyer (score)
- Production companies: Blowback Pictures; Heaven Adores You; Zoetrope Aubry Prod.
- Distributed by: Eagle Rock Entertainment
- Release date: 5 May 2014 (San Francisco Film Festival)
- Running time: 104 minutes
- Country: United States
- Language: English

Heaven Adores You is a 2014 documentary about the life and music of indie rock singer-songwriter Elliott Smith (1969–2003). It premiered at the San Francisco International Film Festival on May 5, 2014.

== Synopsis ==
The film focuses on Smith's life in the three cities he lived in during his music career (Portland, New York and Los Angeles), highlighted by his five solo albums from 1994–2000 and his 1998 Academy Award nomination for Best Original Song for "Miss Misery" in Good Will Hunting. It features personal photos, concert footage, and recorded conversations and interviews with Smith, his friends and collaborators. Participants include Smith's sister Ashley Welch, Jon Brion, Larry Crane, Tony Lash, Joanna Bolme, Rob Schnapf, and Kill Rock Stars founder Slim Moon.

In addition to having at least one song from each of his albums, the track listing contains over a dozen previously unreleased Elliott Smith songs, spanning the length of his career. Heaven Adores You is the first documentary to gain permission to use Smith's music.

== Production ==
Director Nickolas Rossi first became familiar with Smith's music in the mid-'90s while living in Portland. He started contemplating making a documentary about him in 2007 after receiving positive response from a short tribute video he shot at the Figure 8 wall, following Smith’s death in 2003.

In the fall of 2009, fellow filmmaker Jeremiah Gurzi teamed up with Rossi, and in January 2010, they traveled to Portland. In 2011, a Kickstarter crowdfunding campaign was launched to raise awareness of the film and to help supplement the initial funds needed to officially start the project. Following the successful launch, they received an email from Kevin Moyer, who attended the same high school as Smith, offering to help. Moyer came on as a producer and music supervisor, and arranged most of the interviews. A majority of the shooting took place in 2012. By the fall of 2013, longtime colleague and multi-award winning veteran producer Marc Smolowitz officially joined the team, helping steward the project through post-production and to a prominently placed world premiere at the 57th San Francisco International Film Festival. After a year-long global festival run, the film was acquired by Eagle Rock Entertainment for worldwide distribution in the summer of 2015.

== Reception ==
On review aggregator Rotten Tomatoes, the film holds an approval rating of 82% based on 17 reviews, with an average rating of 6.22/10. The San Francisco Bay Guardian described the film as "an artfully crafted study of a unique talent." Way Too Indie called it "a tasteful, haunting portrait," while Ground Control magazine praised it as "a celebration of the fullness of the life [Smith] lived."

== Soundtrack ==
Heaven Adores You Soundtrack

Soundtrack album by Elliott Smith
- Released: February 6, 2016
- Recorded: 1983–2001
- Genres: Soundtrack, indie rock, acoustic rock, indie folk
- Label: UMe

Elliott Smith chronology
An Introduction to... Elliott Smith (2010)	Heaven Adores You Soundtrack (2016)

Professional ratings
Aggregate scores
Source	Rating
Metacritic	79/100
Review scores
Source	Rating
Paste	9/10
Consequence of Sound	B
Pitchfork	7.3/10
AllMusic	3.5/5 stars
Rolling Stone	3.5/5 stars

Heaven Adores You Soundtrack is the soundtrack album to the 2014 documentary Heaven Adores You about the life of Elliott Smith. The album, produced by Kevin Moyer and released by Universal Music Group, comprises demos and alternate versions of songs, and includes the previously unreleased "True Love." Some of the songs on the album had been shared via bootlegs, but most tracks included on the soundtrack release hadn't been previously heard or released. The soundtrack album artwork includes extensive information from contributors about the songs included

All tracks are written by Elliott Smith

No.	Title	Length
1.	"Untitled Guitar Finger Picking" (1983)	1:24
2.	"Untitled Melancholy Song" (1993)	3:42
3.	"Don't Call Me Billy" (early version of "Fear City," 1993)	4:12
4.	"Christian Brothers" (performed with Heatmiser, 1995)	5:01
5.	"Hamburgers" (performed with Neil Gust, 1995)	4:06
6.	"Plainclothes Man" (Smith solo version, 1996)	3:43
7.	"Unknown Song" (instrumental, 1994)	3:21
8.	"Say Yes" (live at the Yo Yo a Go Go Festival, Olympia, WA, 1997)	2:51
9.	"Unknown" (instrumental, 1994)	3:51
10.	"Coast to Coast" (early version, 1995-96)	4:41
11.	"Waltz #1" (demo, 1997)	3:01
12.	"Untitled Soft Song in F" (1993)	4:35
13.	"True Love" (2001)	5:24
14.	"Miss Misery" (live on Late Night with Conan O'Brien, 1998)	3:22
15.	"L.A." (1999)	3:15
16.	"Son of Sam" (acoustic, 1999)	3:05
17.	"The Last Hour" (early version, 1999)	3:39
18.	"Everything Means Nothing to Me" (1999)	2:23
19.	"Happiness" (single version, 1999)	5:15
20.	"I Love My Room" (1984-85)	5:22
