= Roman Candle (album) =

Studio album by Elliott Smith
- Released: July 14, 1994
- Recorded: 1993
- Genre: Folk; lo-fi
- Length: 30:25
- Label: Cavity Search
- Producer: Elliott Smith

Elliott Smith chronology
Roman Candle (1994)	Elliott Smith (1995)

Roman Candle is the debut studio album by American singer-songwriter Elliott Smith. It was recorded in late 1993 and released on July 14, 1994, by record label Cavity Search.

== Background and recording ==
Roman Candle was recorded and released while Smith was still in Heatmiser. According to Benjamin Nugent's biography Elliott Smith and the Big Nothing, Smith recorded the album in the basement of the home of then-girlfriend and Heatmiser manager JJ Gonson.

The album was never intended for release, as Smith only expected to get a deal for a 7-inch single; however, after Gonson played the album for Cavity Search, they immediately requested permission to release it in its entirety. Smith at first hesitated, and then allowed permission.

== Content ==
The album has a raw, homemade sound, with Smith playing each instrument and recording it on his four-track recorder. Additionally, he used a Shure SM57 and an inexpensive RadioShack dynamic microphone to capture the sound.

The front cover features a photograph of Neil Gust (of Heatmiser) and friend Amy Dalsimer, taken by Gonson. Smith chose the image because he "liked the way the picture looked as a 'piece of art'".

== Release ==
Roman Candle was released on CD and cassette on July 14, 1994.

In 1998, Roman Candle was released on vinyl for the first time by Domino Records in the UK only. It later saw vinyl release in the United States in 2010.

Roman Candle was reissued on April 6, 2010, by record label Kill Rock Stars. It was remastered by Larry Crane, with the original mixes by Smith remaining intact. On the official press release on Sweetadeline.net, Crane said of the remaster:

The intention that I had was to make the album more listenable. I felt that a lot of the guitar "squeaks" were jarring and very loud, and that many of the hard consonants and "s" sounds were jarring and scratchy sounding. I felt by reducing these noises that the music would become more inviting and the sound would serve the songs better. When I went to Roger Seibel's SAE Mastering, he proceeded to equalize the tracks a small amount and to make the volume slightly louder. We never tried to make this CD as loud as current, over-limited trends, but just to match the volume of the rest of Elliott's KRS catalog in a graceful way. Please note that none of this album is "remixed" from the master tapes – it is still composed of the mixes Elliott created himself.

== Reception ==
Professional ratings
Review scores
Source	Rating
AllMusic	4/5 stars
American Songwriter	4/5 stars
Consequence of Sound	4/5 stars
The Guardian	3/5 stars
The Irish Times	4/5 stars
NME	6/10
Pitchfork	7.8/10
Record Collector	3/5 stars
The Rolling Stone Album Guide	4/5 stars
Uncut	4/5 stars

According to Nugent, the initial response to Roman Candle was mixed, with some passing it off as being derivative of Simon & Garfunkel. The Rocket wrote that "Smith conveys an all-too convincing anguish, noble, credible and alluring in its understatement."

Roman Candle has since been well received by critics. In its retrospective review, BBC Music opined that the album "remains a searingly honest and decisive collection. As a genesis of exceptional talent it is flawless, and heartbreakingly so." Consequence of Sound called the album "far from a genius effort, but nonetheless an important solo performance pointing towards where his many strengths and few weaknesses as a singer and songwriter were." Pitchfork has described the album's musical style as "lo-fi folk".

== Track listing ==
All tracks are written by Elliott Smith, except "No Name #1", written by Smith and JJ Gonson.

No.	Title	Length
1.	"Roman Candle"	3:37
2.	"Condor Ave"	3:34
3.	"No Name #1"	3:03
4.	"No Name #2"	3:34
5.	"No Name #3"	3:13
6.	"Drive All Over Town"	2:36
7.	"No Name #4"	2:30
8.	"Last Call"	4:38
9.	"Kiwi Maddog 20/20"	3:40
Total length:		30:25

== Personnel ==
- Elliott Smith – acoustic guitar, vocals, electric guitar ("Roman Candle", "Last Call", "Kiwi Maddog 20/20"), harmonica ("No Name #2"), producer

Additional personnel

- Kid Tulsa (Pete Krebs) – snare and cymbal ("No Name #1", "Kiwi Maddog 20/20")

Technical

- Tony Lash – mixing assistance
- Neil Gust – sleeve design and photography
- JJ Gonson – album cover photography
- Peter Hawkinson – technician
