= Yellow No. 5 (EP) =

EP by Heatmiser
- Released: April 26, 1994
- Recorded: November 1992; February 1994 at C.A.M.M
- Genre: Indie rock, alternative rock
- Length: 11:54
- Label: Frontier
- Producer: Heatmiser

Heatmiser chronology
Dead Air (1993)	Yellow No. 5 (1994)	Cop and Speeder (1994)

Yellow No. 5 is an EP by American alternative rock band Heatmiser, released in 1994 by record label Frontier between the albums Dead Air (1993) and Cop and Speeder (1994).

The EP was also released as a split cassette EP on Frontier Records, with Yellow No. 5 on side A and All Souls Alive by Australian rock band The Blackeyed Susans on side B (excluding the first four songs from All Souls Alive, which are also on side A).

== Recording ==
Yellow No. 5 was recorded in February 1994 at The Center for Applied Music and Media (C.A.M.M) and mixed at Dead Aunt Thelma's in Portland, Oregon, except for "Wake", recorded in November 1992. (Another version of "Wake" appeared on the "Stray" single.) It was produced by Heatmiser, with the production being assisted by Eric Hedford, then of The Dandy Warhols (Heatmiser band member Tony Lash would later produce several of their records).

== Reception ==
Professional ratings
Review scores
Source	Rating
AllMusic	2.5/5 stars

Trouser Press opined that the EP had "more personality and varied approaches" than Dead Air. Nitsuh Abebe of AllMusic called the EP the group's most accessible and "poppy" release.

== Track listing ==
No.	Title	Writer(s)	Length
1.	"Wake"	Elliott Smith	1:24
2.	"Fortune 500"	Neil Gust	2:00
3.	"The Corner Seat"	Smith	2:35
4.	"Idler"	Smith	3:23
5.	"Junior Mint"	Gust	3:57

Note: Five seconds after "Junior Mint" ends at 2:32, a hidden track begins. The song is an instrumental jam that lasts 1:20.

== Personnel ==
Heatmiser

- Neil Gust – vocals, guitar, sleeve art direction
- Tony Lash – drums, engineering
- Brandt Peterson – bass guitar
- Elliott Smith – vocals, guitar

Technical

- Eric Hedford – production assistance
- Colin Burns – cover illustration
- J.J. Gonson – sleeve photography
