= Elliott Smith and the Big Nothing =

2004 biography of Elliott Smith by Benjamin Nugent

- Author: Benjamin Nugent
- Cover artist: Alex Camlin, Karen Mason-Blair
- Language: English
- Genre: Biography, music
- Publisher: Da Capo
- Publication date: October 30, 2004
- Publication place: United States
- Media type: Print
- Pages: 230
- ISBN: 0-306-81447-1
- OCLC: 61440629

Elliott Smith and the Big Nothing is a biography of musician Elliott Smith by Benjamin Nugent. It was published by Da Capo Press on October 30, 2004, just past the one-year anniversary of Smith's death. The book contains interviews with two of the musician's producers, Rob Schnapf and David McConnell, and friends such as Pete Krebs, and Bill Santen, but does not contain any original interviews with Smith, his family or his close friends.

== Critical reception ==
The book received mixed reviews, with Publishers Weekly remarking that while "Nugent manages to patch together the major beats of Smith's life, he can offer little meaningful insight" and that Smith's fans "will be disappointed by this short and shallow biography." PopMatters cited that Nugent "fails on a very basic level to discriminate between his privilege as a fan of Smith's unforgettable music and his responsibilities as a journalist writing an objective study of Smith's life" and the book "is murky, indistinct and woefully incomplete." CNN said in their mixed review that "Nugent sometimes gets a little too insider-y—too many details about too many '90s indie bands—and his insistences on Smith's sense of humor, though no doubt true, ring hollow." Many of the book's detractors complained about the absence of original testimony from Smith's family and close friends such as Joanna Bolme, Neil Gust, Sam Coomes and Janet Weiss. Ironically, many of his close friends granted interviews for the December 2004 issue of SPIN just as Elliott Smith and the Big Nothing was sent to print.

Perhaps the most damning review of the book came from LA Weekly's Alec Hanley Bemis, who himself is ironically thanked in the acknowledgement section of Nugent's book. He graded Elliott Smith and the Big Nothing as "shallow", "sloppy", "a quickie", reliant on "second-degree friends and third-party accounts" and includes "fact checking that doesn't extend far beyond Google." He cited one particular passage wherein he argued Nugent incorrectly wrote that Smith spent an evening partying in New York City with hip hop mogul and Def Jam Records founder Russell Simmons, when he was actually hanging out with the drummer from the indie rock band The Jon Spencer Blues Explosion, Russell Simins. Bemis goes on to say that Nugent "failed to realize the Blues Explosion's drummer happens to be named Russell Simins, a profoundly inconvenient homonym for a writer hurriedly transcribing interviews and rushing a book into print. The biography is filled with many such errors and approximations." The Simmons/Simins mistake was not corrected in subsequent editions of the biography.

However, Jim DeRogatis wrote in the Chicago Sun-Times that Nugent "did his research and left few stones unturned in telling Smith's relatively short and very sad story", and the Austin Chronicle stated that Nugent "opens a window of insight into our reluctant hero."

=== Author response ===
In a paperback edition released a year later, Nugent used a new afterword to respond to his critics, revealing that his publisher had given him an option of two deadlines: either on the first anniversary of Smith's death, or on the release date of Smith's posthumous album From a Basement on the Hill. Nugent aimed for the release of the album, but when it was revealed the album was to coincide with the anniversary of Smith's death, he had no choice but to rush the book to completion.
