= Mic City Sons =

Studio album by Heatmiser
- Released: October 29, 1996; July 25, 2025 (30th anniversary reissue)
- Genre: Indie rock
- Length: 38:35
- Labels: Caroline; Third Man Records

Heatmiser chronology
Cop and Speeder (1994)	Mic City Sons (1996)

Mic City Sons is the third and final album by American alternative rock band Heatmiser, released on October 29, 1996, through record label Caroline.

== Recording ==
Mic City Sons is the band's only recording for a major label; however, when individuals at Virgin Records learned the band might be on the verge of disbanding, the album was subsequently licensed for release through the smaller sister label Caroline Records (also an EMI subsidiary) and their distributor of the same name.

The album was recorded in a house in Portland, Oregon the band had rented and converted into a studio. Throughout the sessions, tensions were high, particularly between singer-guitarist Elliott Smith and drummer/producer Tony Lash. Smith saw Lash as being a perfectionist, while Smith wanted the album to be "raw" and spontaneous. In order to resolve these tensions, the band asked Virgin for more money to hire producers Rob Schnapf and Tom Rothrock, to which the label agreed.

Singer-guitarist Neil Gust has stated that "Low Flying Jets" deals with his lack of confidence in the band, feelings of isolation, and the breakdown in the relationships between the band members.

Smith did not play on "Rest My Head Against the Wall", which was recorded by Neil Gust, who played an acoustic guitar with a slide, Lash on drums, and bassist Sam Coomes on keyboards. Gust has said that "Rest My Head Against the Wall" and "Cruel Reminder" are about an infatuation he had on a straight gas station owner:

I would walk past this gas station and the owner of the gas station was this guy that I developed a total obsession over. He's a straight guy, you know, I found him really appealing. And so I would walk by, I would make an excuse to walk by that gas station all the time. And it would be really thrilling to see him and then afterwards, I would just feel sort of hopeless because I didn't know how to meet anybody. (...) I just didn't feel like I could connect with anyone. My experience back then was you know, I was in the closet until, really until I moved to Portland. So moving to Portland was like a rebirth. The thing is, I was 21. And I had no experience being in a relationship, whereas all my straight friends had girlfriends when they're 14 years old. You know, they'd had some training about what that's like. And it's also something that you're taught when you're straight, but I didn't have any guidance. It's also like, AIDS had killed the generation of gay men, who would have been mentors to people my age, and they were wiped out. So I didn't know other gay people and I wasn't comfortable talking about how little I knew. And so I would just let it come out in songs. And the way it came out was just kind of this constant dissatisfaction (laughs).

On "The Fix is In", Gust's acoustic guitar and Lash's drums were put through amps and Coomes used an EBow on his bass.

"Eagle Eye", written by Gust, was influenced by the Feelies. The song deals with his experiences patronizing gay bars and feeling isolated, "about the thrill of going to the bars, and then the disappointment of not meeting somebody every weekend."

According to Gust, "Pop in G" was written by Smith, who "brought [the song] in and wanted to throw it away. And I absolutely wouldn't let him." The title of the album is taken from a line in the song: "Mic city sons seem to dumb everything down".

Gust has said that "Blue Highway" is "the last version of two other songs that all sound really different. But they share kind of some of the same lyrics. The lyric they all share is about 'the windshield cracking and the lines in my hand and the map of a broken heart,' which is just this imagery I was clinging to about what the band was going through and what my friendship with Elliott was going through, where I just felt like it was cracking."

== Release ==
Mic City Sons was released on October 29, 1996, through Virgin Records sub-label Caroline. A thirtieth anniversary double-LP edition of the album, on standard black 12" vinyl and limited-edition color variants, featuring demos and unreleased tracks, was released by Third Man Records on July 25th, 2025.

== Reception ==
Professional ratings
Review scores
Source	Rating
AllMusic	4/5 stars
Entertainment Weekly	A−
Pitchfork	7.9/10

Michael Frey of AllMusic called the album "an outstanding collection of diverse and invigorating tracks". Tracks "Pop in G" and "See You Later" were called "two of the best indie rock songs of the '90s". He finished by saying "Despite the success Heatmiser's members have achieved since their disbanding, it's unfortunate that this collective decided to split up just when they had reached such a creative peak." On the album's style, Michael Frey of AllMusic noted "a decidedly more pop feel than its predecessors".

== Track listing ==
No.	Title	Writer(s)	Length
1.	"Get Lucky"	Elliott Smith	2:50
2.	"Plainclothes Man"	Smith	3:28
3.	"Low-Flying Jets"	Neil Gust	2:50
4.	"Rest My Head Against the Wall"	Gust	3:31
5.	"The Fix Is In"	Smith	4:38
6.	"Eagle Eye"	Gust	2:18
7.	"Cruel Reminder"	Gust	2:41
8.	"You Gotta Move"	Smith	2:08
9.	"Pop in G"	Smith	3:18
10.	"Blue Highway"	Gust	2:48
11.	"See You Later"	Smith	3:43
12.	"Half Right" (hidden track)	Smith	4:22

Expanded 30th anniversary edition - disc one
No.	Title	Writer(s)	Length
1.	"Get Lucky"	Elliott Smith	2:51
2.	"Plainclothes Man"	Smith	3:30
3.	"Low-Flying Jets"	Neil Gust	2:50
4.	"Rest My Head Against the Wall"	Gust	3:31
5.	"The Fix Is In"	Smith	4:38
6.	"Eagle Eye"	Gust	2:19
7.	"Cruel Reminder"	Gust	2:42
8.	"You Gotta Move"	Smith	2:08
9.	"Pop in G"	Smith	3:18
10.	"Blue Highway"	Gust	2:49
11.	"See You Later"	Smith	3:43
12.	"Half Right"	Smith	4:20

Expanded 30th anniversary edition - disc two
No.	Title	Writer(s)	Length
13.	"Cocksucker's Blues" (bonus track)	Gust	2:38
14.	"I'm Over That Now" (bonus track)	Smith	4:13
15.	"Silent Treatment" (bonus track)	Gust	2:33
16.	"Burned Out, Still Glowing" (bonus track)	Smith	2:14
17.	"Rocker in C" (bonus track)	Gust	2:31
18.	"Get Lucky" (demo) (bonus track)	Smith	2:42
19.	"Everybody Has It" (bonus track) (originally appeared on the Everybody Has It single, 1996)	Smith	4:02
20.	"Dark Cloud" (bonus track)	Gust	2:16
21.	"Dirty Dream" (bonus track) (originally appeared on the Everybody Has It single, 1996)	Gust	3:12
22.	"You Gotta Move" (demo) (bonus track)	Smith	2:04
23.	"Christian Brothers" (rock version) (bonus track) (a different version than the Heatmiser version on the Heaven Adores You soundtrack)	Smith	4:35
24.	"Untitled Instrumental" (bonus track)	Smith	3:04

Note: track timings taken from YouTube.

== Personnel ==
Heatmiser

- Sam Coomes – bass guitar
- Neil Gust – vocals, guitar, sleeve design and photography
- Tony Lash – drums, sleeve photography, mixing ("Rest My Head Against the Wall" (original release); bonus tracks on reissue except "Everybody Has It")
- Elliott Smith – vocals, guitar

Additional personnel

- Aaron Day – additional vocals ("Get Lucky")
- Sean Croghan – backing vocals ("Cruel Reminder")
- Steve Hanford – drums ("Untitled Instrumental") (reissue)

Technical

- Mark Chalecki – mastering (reissue)
- Rob Schnapf – mixing (all except "Rest My Head Against the Wall" (original release); "Everybody Has It" (reissue))
- Tom Rothrock – mixing (all except "Rest My Head Against the Wall" (original release); "Everybody Has It" (reissue))
- Steve Marcussen – mastering
- Storm Tharp – sleeve photography
