= Needle in the Hay =

Single by Elliott Smith

from the album Elliott Smith
- B-side: "Alphabet Town": "Some Song"
- Released: January 1, 1995
- Recorded: September 1994
- Studio: House of Tony Lash, bandmate of Elliott's
- Genre: Indie folk; lo-fi
- Length: 4:16
- Label: Kill Rock Stars
- Songwriter: Elliott Smith
- Producer: Elliott Smith

Elliott Smith singles chronology
"Shytown" / "No Confidence Man" (1994)	"Needle in the Hay" (1995)	"Miss Misery" (1997)

"Needle in the Hay" is a song released in 1995 by American singer-songwriter Elliott Smith. It was the sole single from his second studio album, Elliott Smith.

== Recording ==
Trumpet and harmonica were recorded for the song but were omitted from the final mix. A mix featuring the extra instrumentation was released in March 2012.

== Release ==
"Needle in the Hay" was released as a 7" vinyl single on January 1, 1995, by record label Kill Rock Stars. It is the lead track on the album Elliott Smith, released that July.

== Live performances ==
During later shows with a full band, the song was given more of a "rock" arrangement and featured drums and bass, with Elliott Smith singing the vocals an octave higher.

== Legacy ==
Pitchfork Media ranked the song 27th in its list of the 200 best songs of the 1990s.

"Needle in the Hay" appeared in Wes Anderson's 2001 film The Royal Tenenbaums in a scene featuring a suicide attempt by Richie Tenenbaum (Luke Wilson). Smith was reportedly unhappy about the song being used this way. The song appeared on the film's soundtrack.

In 2017, Australian music and culture publication Happy Mag launched an annual vinyl competition named after "Needle in the Hay."

== Cover versions ==
The song has been covered by numerous artists, including punk band Bad Astronaut for their 2001 album Acrophobe; drone metal duo Nadja on their 2009 covers album When I See the Sun Always Shines on T.V.; Mélissa Laveaux on her 2006 album Camphor & Copper; and Juliana Hatfield in 2014's I Saved Latin! A Tribute to Wes Anderson, a tribute album of songs used in the director's films. It was also covered in a viral video of a parody of The Muppets character Kermit the Frog, referencing the use of the song in The Royal Tenenbaums.

In July 2018, singer-songwriter Vanessa Carlton digitally released her recording of "Needle in the Hay"; Carlton selected the track among a variety of songs that were unveiled as part of her Six Covers / Six Months showcase.

== Track listing ==
1. "Needle in the Hay" – 4:17
2. "Alphabet Town" – 4:12
3. "Some Song (Extended Intro)" – 2:21
