= Elliott Smith =

American musician (1969–2003)

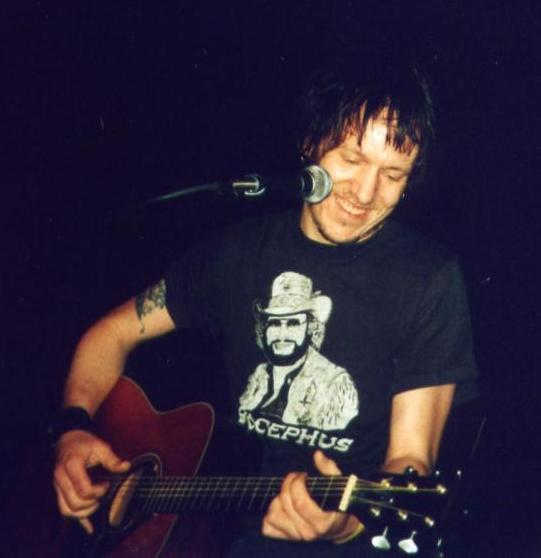
- Smith performing in 2003

Background information
- Born: Steven Paul Smith; August 6, 1969; Omaha, Nebraska, U.S.
- Died: October 21, 2003 (aged 34) Los Angeles, California, U.S.
- Genres: Indie folk; indie pop; indie rock; lo-fi
- Occupations: Musician; singer; songwriter; multi-instrumentalist
- Instruments: Vocals; guitar; keyboards; piano; harmonica; clarinet; bass; drums
- Works: Discography
- Years active: 1985–2003
- Labels: Virgin; Caroline; Cavity Search; Kill Rock Stars; Suicide Squeeze; DreamWorks; ANTI-; Domino
- Formerly of: Heatmiser
- Website: elliottsmith.co

Steven Paul Smith (August 6, 1969 – October 21, 2003), known as Elliott Smith, was an American musician and singer-songwriter. Raised primarily in Texas, he lived much of his life in Portland, Oregon, where he gained popularity in the 1990s. Smith's primary instrument was the guitar, though he also played piano, clarinet, bass guitar, drums, and harmonica. His work was distinguished by his "whispery, spiderweb-thin" vocal style, his "artful chord changes", and his themes of "addiction, depression, and alienation". The New Musical Express (NME) described him as a "widely adored singer-songwriter" who "touched countless lives with his compelling musicianship and lyricism".

After playing in the rock band Heatmiser for several years, Smith began his solo career in 1994, with releases on the independent record labels Cavity Search and Kill Rock Stars (KRS). In 1997, he signed a contract with DreamWorks Records, for which he recorded his final two albums. Smith's song "Miss Misery", recorded for the film Good Will Hunting (1997), was nominated for the 1998 Academy Award for Best Original Song.

A recovering heavy drinker and drug user, Smith was also diagnosed with attention deficit hyperactivity disorder (ADHD) and depression. His struggle with substances and mental illness affected his life and work, and often appeared in his lyrics. He died at his Los Angeles home from two stab wounds to the chest at age 34 in 2003. The autopsy evidence did not determine whether the wounds were self-inflicted. At the time of his death, Smith was working on his album From a Basement on the Hill, which was posthumously produced and released in 2004.

== Early life ==
Steven Paul Smith was born on August 6, 1969, at the Methodist Hospital in Omaha, Nebraska, the only child of Gary Smith, a student at the University of Nebraska Medical Center, and Bunny Kay Berryman, an elementary school music teacher. His parents divorced when he was six months old, and Smith moved with his mother to Duncanville, Texas. He had half-siblings through his mother, Darren Welch and Ashley Welch, and a half-sister Rachel Smith through his father. Smith later had a map of Texas tattooed on his upper arm and said: "I didn't get it because I like Texas, kind of the opposite. But I won't forget about it, although I'm tempted to because I don't like it there."

Smith endured a difficult childhood and a troubled relationship with his stepfather Charlie Welch. Smith stated he may have been sexually abused by Welch at a young age—an allegation denied by Welch. He wrote about this part of his life in "Some Song". The name "Charlie" also appears in songs "Flowers for Charlie" and "No Confidence Man". In a 2004 interview, Jennifer Chiba, Smith's partner at the time of his death, said that Smith's difficult childhood was partly why he needed to sedate himself with drugs as an adult: "He was remembering traumatic things from his childhood – parts of things. It's not my place to say what."

For much of his childhood, Smith's family was a part of the Community of Christ but began attending services at a local Methodist church. Smith felt that going to church did little for him, except make him "really scared of Hell". In 2001, he said: "I don't necessarily buy into any officially structured version of spirituality. But I have my own version of it."

Smith began playing piano at age nine, and at ten began learning guitar on a small acoustic guitar bought for him by his father. At this age he composed an original piano piece, "Fantasy", which won him a prize at an arts festival. Many of the people on his mother's side of the family were non-professional musicians; his grandfather was a Dixieland drummer, and his grandmother sang in a glee club.

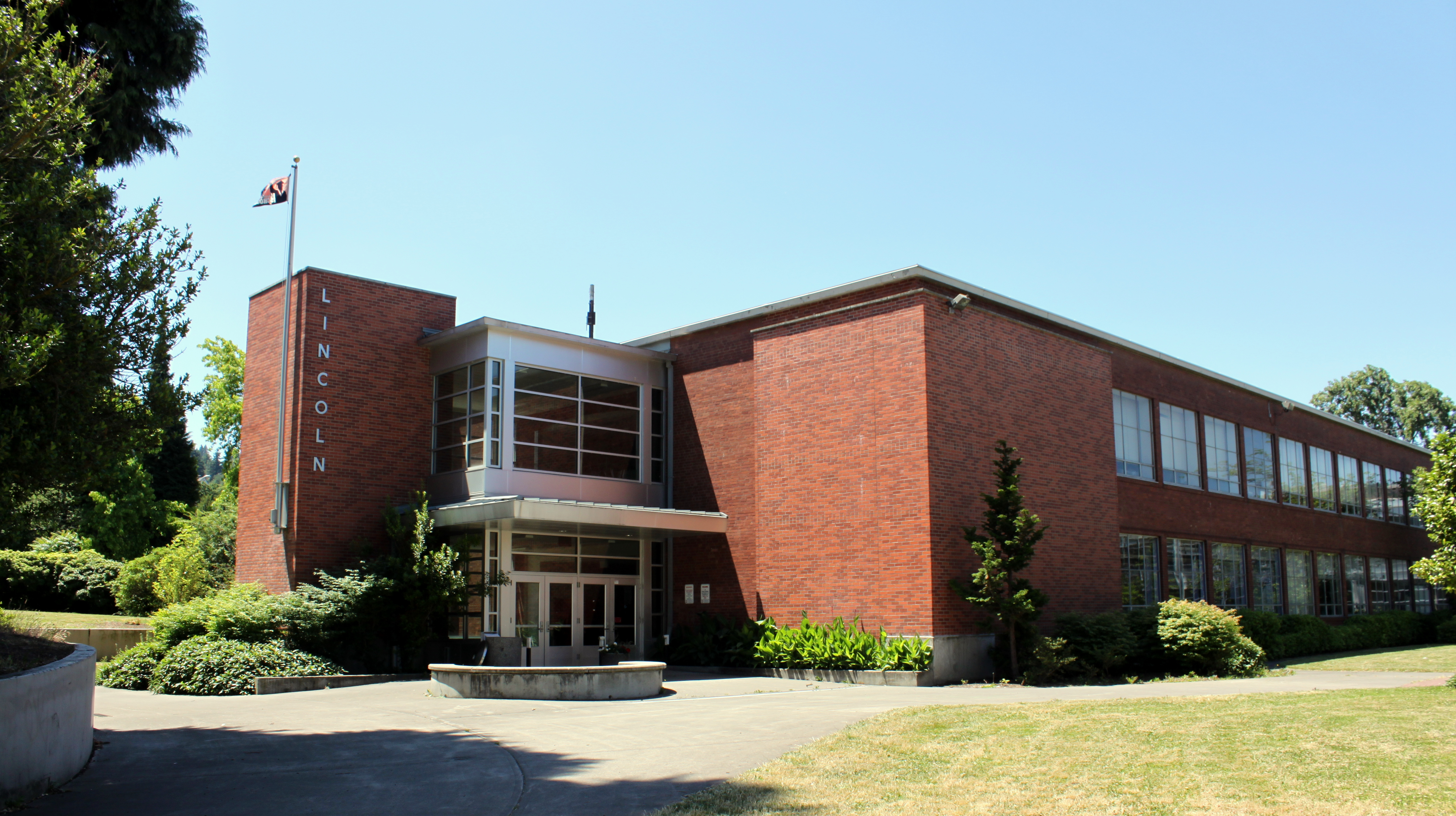
Smith graduated from Lincoln High School in Portland, Oregon.

At fourteen, Smith left his mother's home in Texas and moved to Portland, Oregon, to live with his father, who was then working as a psychiatrist. It was around this time that Smith began using drugs, including alcohol, with friends. He also began experimenting with recording for the first time after borrowing a four-track recorder. At high school, Smith played clarinet in the school band and played guitar and piano; he also sang in the bands Stranger Than Fiction and A Murder of Crows, billed as either Steven Smith or "Johnny Panic". His bandmates included Jason Hornick. He graduated from Lincoln High School as a National Merit Scholar.

After graduation, Smith began calling himself "Elliott", saying that he thought "Steve" sounded too much like a "jock" name, and that "Steven" sounded "too bookish". According to friends, he had also used the pseudonym "Elliott Stillwater-Rotter" during his time in the band A Murder of Crows. Biographer S. R. Shutt speculates that the name was either inspired by Elliott Avenue, a street that Smith had lived on in Portland, or that it was suggested by his then-girlfriend. A junior high acquaintance of Smith speculates Smith changed his name so as not to be confused with Steve Smith, the drummer of Journey.

== Career ==
=== 1991–1996: Heatmiser ===
In 1991, Smith graduated from Hampshire College in Amherst, Massachusetts with a degree in philosophy and political science. "Went straight through in four years", he explained to Under the Radar in 2003. "I guess it proved to myself that I could do something I really didn't want to for four years. Except I did like what I was studying. At the time it seemed like, 'This is your one and only chance to go to college and you had just better do it because some day you might wish that you did.' Plus, the whole reason I applied in the first place was because of my girlfriend, and I had gotten accepted already even though we had broken up before the first day." His undergrad senior thesis was titled "Toward a Post-Structuralist Feminist Jurisprudence" and was heavily inspired by feminist theorist Catharine Mackinnon. After he graduated, he "worked in a bakery back in Portland with a bachelor's degree in philosophy and legal theory".

While at Hampshire College, Smith formed the band Heatmiser with classmate Neil Gust. After Smith graduated from Hampshire, the band added drummer Tony Lash and bassist Brandt Peterson and began performing around Portland in 1992. The group released the albums Dead Air (1993) and Cop and Speeder (1994), as well as the Yellow No. 5 EP (1994) on Frontier Records. They were then signed to Virgin Records to release what became their final album Mic City Sons (1996).

Around this time, Smith and Gust worked a number of odd jobs around Portland, including installing drywall, spreading gravel, transplanting bamboo trees, and painting the roof of a warehouse with heat reflective paint. The pair were also on unemployment benefits for some time, which they considered an "artist grant".

Smith had begun his solo career while still in Heatmiser, and the success of his first two releases created distance and tension with his band. Heatmiser disbanded prior to the release of Mic City Sons, prompting Virgin to put the album out inauspiciously through its independent arm Caroline Records. A clause in Heatmiser's record contract with Virgin meant that Smith was still bound to it as an individual. The contract was later bought out by DreamWorks prior to the recording of his album XO.

=== 1994: Roman Candle ===
"Condor Ave"
Sample of Elliott Smith's "Condor Ave" from Roman Candle (1994), reported to have been written when he was around 17 years old, showing Smith's early songwriting style and lo-fi sound

In the early 1990s, Smith's girlfriend at the time convinced him to send a tape of songs he had recently recorded on a borrowed four-track to Cavity Search Records. Cavity owner Christopher Cooper asked to release the entire album of songs, which surprised Smith, as he was expecting only a deal for a seven-inch record. The album became Smith's release Roman Candle (1994).

Smith said: "I thought my head would be chopped off immediately when it came out because at the time it was so opposite to the grunge thing that was popular ... The thing is that album was really well received, which was a total shock, and it immediately eclipsed [Heatmiser], unfortunately." Smith felt his solo songs were not representative of the music Heatmiser was making: "The idea of playing [my music] for people didn't occur to me ... because at the time it was the Northwest—Mudhoney and Nirvana—and going out to play an acoustic show was like crawling out on a limb and begging for it to be sawed off."

One of Smith's first solo performances was in Portland at the now-defunct Umbra Penumbra on September 17, 1994. Only three songs from Roman Candle were performed, with the majority of the ten-song set being B-sides, Heatmiser tunes and unreleased tracks. The same year, Smith released a split 7-inch record with Pete Krebs via Slo-Mo Records, contributing the track "No Confidence Man".

=== 1995–1997: Elliott Smith and Either/Or ===
"Pictures of Me"
Sample of Elliott Smith's "Pictures of Me", from Either/Or (1997), showing his style of vocal harmony through multi-tracking. The track also showcases the album's expanded instrumentation, with all instruments being played by Smith.

In 1995, Smith's self-titled album was released on Kill Rock Stars; the record featured a style of recording similar to Roman Candle, but with hints of growth and experimentation. Though the majority of the album was recorded by Smith alone, friend and The Spinanes vocalist Rebecca Gates sang harmony vocals on "St. Ides Heaven", and Heatmiser guitarist Neil Gust played guitar on "Single File". Several songs made reference to drugs, but Smith explained that he used the theme of drugs as a vehicle for conveying dependence rather than the songs being about drugs specifically. Looking back, Smith felt that the album's pervasive mood gave him "a reputation for being a really dark, depressed person" and said that he later made a conscious move toward more diverse moods in his music.

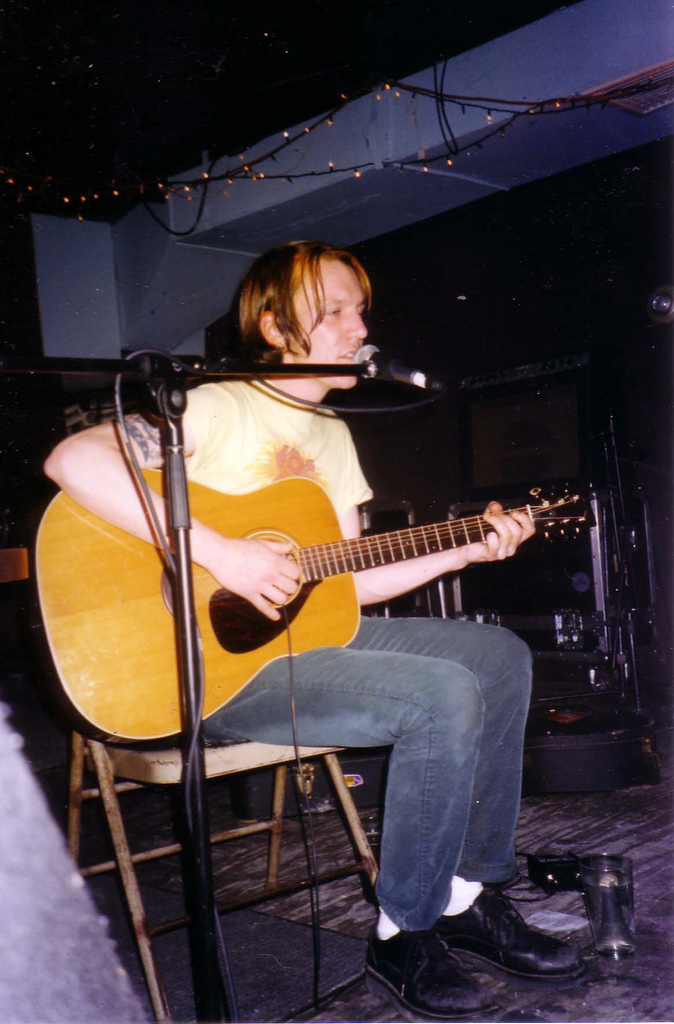
Smith performing at Brownies, New York City, in April 1997, shortly after the release of Either/Or

In 1996, filmmaker Jem Cohen recorded Smith playing acoustic songs for the short film Lucky Three: An Elliott Smith Portrait. Two of these songs would appear on his next album Either/Or, which was another Kill Rock Stars release. Either/Or came out in 1997 to favorable reviews. The album found Smith venturing further into full instrumentation, with several songs containing bass guitar, drums, keyboards, and electric guitars, all played by Smith. The album title was derived from the two-volume book of the same name by Danish philosopher Søren Kierkegaard, whose works generally deal with themes such as existential despair, angst, death, and God.

By this time, Smith's already-heavy drinking was being compounded with use of antidepressants. At the end of the Either/Or tour, some of his close friends staged an intervention in Chicago, but it proved ineffective. Shortly after, Smith relocated from Portland to Jersey City, New Jersey, and later Brooklyn, New York.

=== 1997–1998: "Miss Misery" and Academy Award nomination ===
In 1997, Smith was selected by director and fellow Portland resident Gus Van Sant to be a part of the soundtrack to his film Good Will Hunting. Smith recorded an orchestral version of "Between the Bars" with composer Danny Elfman for the film. Smith also contributed a new song, "Miss Misery", and three previously released tracks ("No Name #3", from Roman Candle, and "Angeles" and "Say Yes", from Either/Or). The film was a commercial and critical success, and Smith was nominated for an Academy Award for "Miss Misery". Not eager to step into the limelight, he agreed to perform the song at the ceremony only after the producers informed him that if he was unwilling to perform, they would choose someone else to play it.

On March 5, 1998, Smith made an appearance on Late Night with Conan O'Brien performing "Miss Misery" solo on acoustic guitar. A few days later, wearing a white suit, he played an abridged version at the Academy Awards ceremony, accompanied by the house orchestra. Smith did not voice disappointment about not winning. He described the experience as surreal, and said: "The Oscars was a very strange show, where the set was only one song cut down to less than two minutes, and the audience was a lot of people who didn't come to hear me play. I wouldn't want to live in that world, but it was fun to walk around on the moon for a day."

=== 1998–2000: XO and Figure 8 ===
In 1998, after the success of Either/Or and "Miss Misery", Smith signed to a bigger record label, DreamWorks Records. Around the same time, Smith fell into depression, speaking openly of considering suicide, and on at least one occasion made a serious attempt at ending his own life. While in North Carolina, he became severely intoxicated and ran off a cliff. He landed on a tree, which badly impaled him but broke his fall. In a 1999 SPIN profile, Smith recalled the incident:

But, um, yeah—I, uh, jumped off a cliff. But it didn't work. It was in North Carolina or somewhere. It wasn't like I made up my mind to throw myself off a cliff. I got freaked out and started running, it was totally dark, and I ran off the edge of a cliff. I saw it coming up, and it wasn't like, "I'm gonna throw myself off this cliff and die". It was just, "Ground's coming up. Who cares, whatever". I landed on a little tree, punctured my, you know, body. It just made a really ugly wound.

Christopher Cooper, head of Cavity Search Records (which released Roman Candle), said about this time in Smith's life, "I talked him out of thinking that he wanted to kill himself numerous times when he was in Portland, Oregon. I kept telling him that he was a brilliant man, and that life was worth living, and that people loved him." Pete Krebs also agreed: "In Portland we got the brunt of Elliott's initial depression ... Lots of people have stories of their own experiences of staying up with Elliott 'til five in the morning, holding his hand, telling him not to kill himself."

Smith's first release for DreamWorks was later that year. Titled XO, it was conceived and developed while Smith wrote it out over the winter of 1997-1998, night after night seated at the bar in Luna Lounge. It was produced by the team of Rob Schnapf and Tom Rothrock. XO also contained some instrumentation from Los Angeles musicians Joey Waronker and Jon Brion. It contained a more full-sounding, baroque pop sound than any of his previous efforts, with songs featuring a horn section, Chamberlins, elaborate string arrangements, and even a drum loop on the song "Independence Day". His familiar double-tracked vocal and acoustic guitar style were still apparent while his somewhat personal lyrical style survived. The album went on to peak at number 104 on the Billboard 200 and number 123 on the UK Album Charts, while selling 400,000 copies (more than double that of each of his two Kill Rock Stars releases), becoming the best-selling release of his career. Smith's backing band during most of this period was the Portland-based group Quasi, consisting of former bandmate Sam Coomes on bass guitar and Coomes's ex-wife Janet Weiss on drums. Quasi also performed as the opening act at many shows on the tour, with Smith sometimes contributing bass guitar, guitar, or backing vocals. On October 17, 1998, Smith appeared on Saturday Night Live and performed "Waltz No. 2 (XO)". His backing band for this appearance was John Moen, Jon Brion, Rob Schnapf, and Sam Coomes.

In response to whether the change to a bigger record label would influence his creative control, Smith said, "I think despite the fact that sometimes people look at major labels as simply money-making machines, they're actually composed of individuals who are real people, and there's a part of them that needs to feel that part of their job is to put out good music." Smith also claimed in another interview that he never read his reviews for fear that they would interfere with his songwriting. It was during this period that Smith appeared on Dutch television in 1998 and provided a candid interview in which he spoke of his assessment of his music career until that point:

Yeah, I don't know. I mean, I mostly only know things are different because people ask me different questions, but I don't feel like things are very changed. I mean, I still, I do the same things that I did before … I think about the same things, so … I'm the wrong kind of person to be really big and famous.

As part of the Dutch television special, Smith played live versions of "Waltz No. 2 (XO)", "Miss Misery", and "I Didn't Understand"—the latter two songs were performed solely on piano, while the first song was cut short by Smith, as he explained: "I had to stop it because it's… you know, what's the point of playing a song badly? It'd be better to play it and mean it, than to just walk through it."

"Son of Sam"
Sample of Elliott Smith's "Son of Sam", the first single from Figure 8 (2000), showing Smith's continuing development of a "more sonically detailed" and lush sound

Smith relocated from Brooklyn to Los Angeles in 1999, taking up residence at a cabin in the Silver Lake section of town, where he would regularly play intimate, acoustic shows at local venues like Silverlake Lounge. He also performed in Toronto in April that year. In the fall, his cover of the Beatles' "Because" was featured in the end credits of DreamWorks' Oscar-winning drama American Beauty, and appeared on the film's soundtrack album.

Figure 8, the final album Smith completed, was released on April 18, 2000. It featured the return of Rothrock, Schnapf, Brion, and Waronker and was partially recorded at Abbey Road Studios in England, with an obvious Beatles influence in the songwriting and production. The album garnered favorable reviews, and peaked at number 99 on the Billboard 200 and 37 on the UK Album Charts. The album received praise for its power pop style and complex arrangements, described as creating a "sweeping kaleidoscope of layered instruments and sonic textures". However, some reviewers felt that Smith's trademark dark and melancholy songwriting had lost some of its subtlety, with one reviewer likening some of the lyrics to "the self-pitying complaints of an adolescent venting in his diary".

Album art and promotional pictures from the period showed Smith looking cleaned-up and put-together. An extensive tour in promotion of the record ensued, book-ended by television appearances on Late Night with Conan O'Brien and the Late Show with David Letterman. However, Smith's condition began to deteriorate as he had become addicted to heroin either towards the end of or just after the Figure 8 tour.

=== 2001–2002: Addiction and scrapped recordings ===
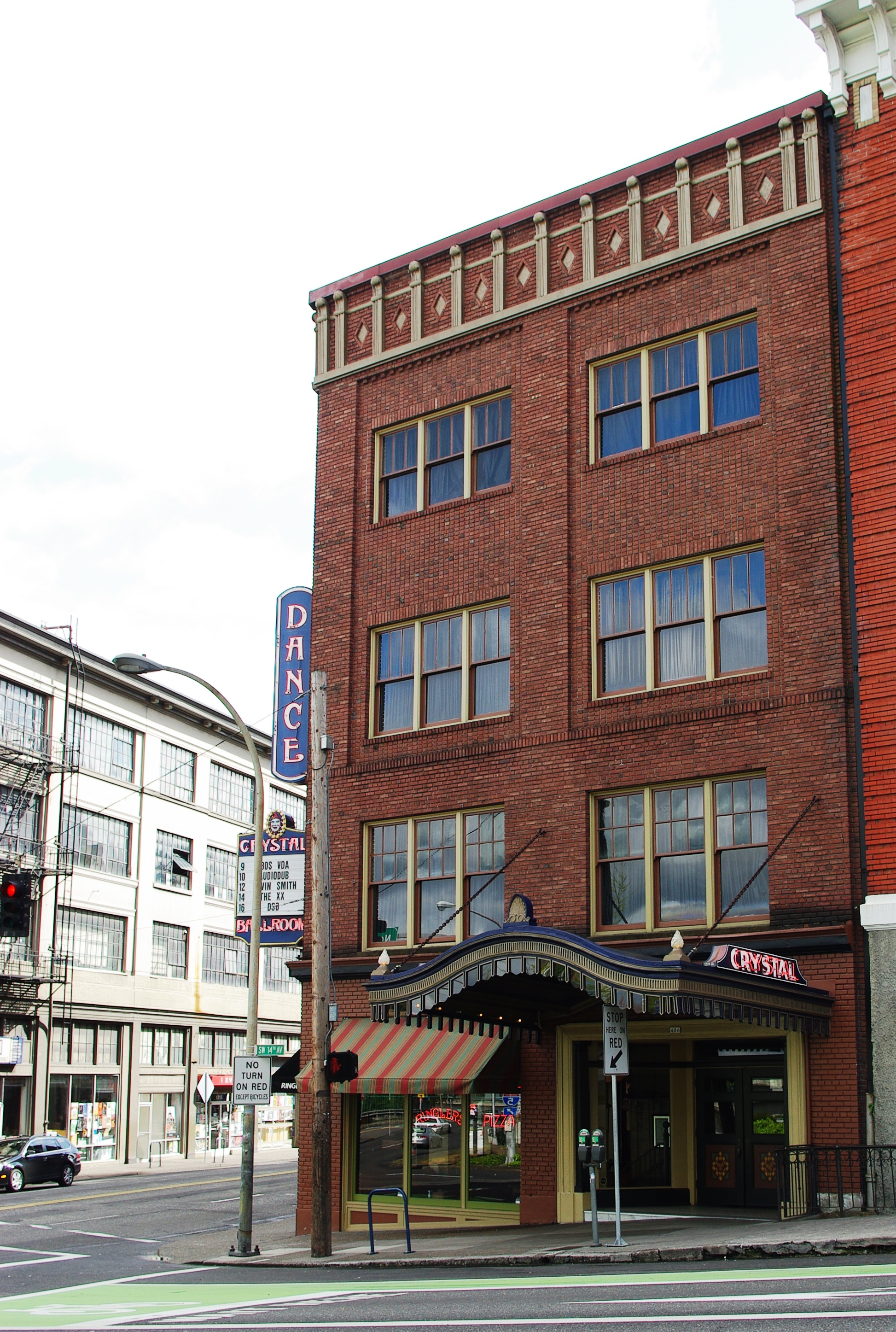
The Crystal Ballroom music venue in Portland, Oregon. One of Smith's performances here in December 2001 drew concern from a reviewer.

Around the time he began recording his final album, Smith began to display signs of paranoia, often believing that a white van followed him wherever he went. He would have friends drop him off for recording sessions almost a mile away from the studio, and to reach the location, he would trudge through hundreds of yards of brush and cliffs. He started telling people that DreamWorks was out to get him: "Not long ago my house was broken into, and songs were stolen off my computer which have wound up in the hands of certain people who work at a certain label. I've also been followed around for months at a time. I wouldn't even want to necessarily say it's the people from that label who are following me around, but it was probably them who broke into my house." During this period, Smith hardly ate, subsisting primarily on ice cream. He would go without sleeping for several days and then sleep for an entire day.

A follow-up to Smith's 2000 album was originally planned to happen with Rob Schnapf, but their sessions were abandoned. Smith also began distancing himself from manager Margaret Mittleman, who had handled him since the Roman Candle days. He finally began recording a new album with only himself and Jon Brion as producers sometime during 2001. The pair had recorded a substantial amount of music for the album when Brion stopped the sessions because of Smith's struggle with substance use disorder. Their friendship promptly ended, and Smith scrapped all of their work until that point. He later said "There was even a little more than half of a record done before this new one that I just scrapped because of a blown friendship with someone that made me so depressed I didn't want to hear any of those songs. He was just helping me record the songs and stuff, and then the friendship kind of fell apart all of a sudden one day. It just made it kind of awkward being alone in the car listening to the songs."

When Brion sent a bill for the abandoned sessions to DreamWorks, executives Lenny Waronker and Luke Wood scheduled a meeting with Smith to determine what went wrong with the sessions. Smith complained of intrusion upon his personal life from the label, as well as poor promotion for the Figure 8 album. The talks proved fruitless, and soon after, Smith sent a message to the executives, stating that if they did not release him from his contract, he would take his own life. In May 2001, Smith set out to re-record the album, mostly on his own, but with some help from David McConnell of Goldenboy. McConnell told Spin that, during this time, Smith smoked over $1,500 worth of heroin and crack per day, often talked about suicide, and on numerous occasions tried to give himself an overdose. Steven Drozd of The Flaming Lips and Scott McPherson of Sense Field played a few drum tracks, Sam Coomes contributed some bass guitar and backing vocals, but almost every other instrument was recorded by Smith.

Smith's song "Needle in the Hay" was included in Wes Anderson's 2001 film The Royal Tenenbaums during a suicide attempt scene. Smith was originally supposed to contribute a cover of The Beatles' "Hey Jude" for the film, but when he failed to do so in time, Anderson had to use The Mutato Muzika Orchestra's version of the track instead. Anderson would later say that Smith "was in a bad state" at the time.

Smith's live performances during 2001 and 2002 were infrequent, typically in the Pacific Northwest or Los Angeles. A review of his December 20, 2001, show at Portland's Crystal Ballroom expressed concern over his appearance and performance: his hair was uncharacteristically greasy and long, his face was bearded and gaunt, and during his songs he exhibited alarming signs of "memory-loss and butterfingers". At another performance in San Francisco that month, the audience began shouting out lyrics when Smith could not remember them.

In the first of only three concerts performed in 2002, Smith co-headlined Northwestern University's A&O Ball with Wilco on May 2 in Chicago. He was onstage for nearly an hour but failed to complete half of the songs. He claimed that his poor performance was due to his left hand having fallen asleep and told the audience it felt "like having stuff on your hand and you can't get it off". Smith's performance was reviewed as "undoubtedly one of the worst performances ever by a musician" and an "excruciating […] nightmare". A reporter for the online magazine Glorious Noise wrote, "It would not surprise me at all if Elliott Smith ends up dead within a year."

On November 25, 2002, Smith was involved in a brawl with the Los Angeles Police Department at a concert where The Flaming Lips and Beck were performing. The officers allegedly beat and arrested him and girlfriend Jennifer Chiba. The two spent the night in jail. Smith's back was injured in the incident, causing him to cancel a number of shows. Wayne Coyne, lead singer of The Flaming Lips and a friend of Smith's, stated concern over Smith's appearance and actions, saying that he "saw a guy who had lost control of himself. He was needy, he was grumpy, he was everything you wouldn't want in a person. It's not like when you think of Keith Richards being pleasantly blissed out in the corner."

=== 2003: Reemergence and From a Basement on the Hill ===
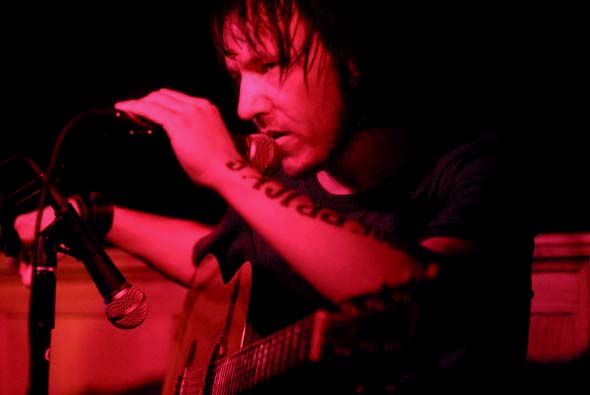
One of Smith's last performances in New York City at the Lit Lounge in January 2003. He played Knitting Factory & North Six in June 2003.

Smith had attempted to go to rehab several times, but found that he was unable to relate to the popular treatments for people with substance use disorder who used a twelve-step program basis for treatment. "I couldn't do the first step ... I couldn't say what you were supposed to say and mean it." In 2002, Smith went to the Neurotransmitter Restoration Center in Beverly Hills to start a course of treatment for substance use disorder. In one of his final interviews, he spoke about the center: "What they do is an IV treatment where they put a needle in your arm, and you're on a drip bag, but the only thing that's in the drip bag is amino acids and saline solution. I was coming off of a lot of psych meds and other things. I was even on an antipsychotic, although I'm not psychotic." While at one rehab center, he was roommates with Rick James.

Two sold-out solo acoustic concerts at Hollywood's Henry Fonda Theater, on January 31 and February 1, 2003, saw Smith attempting to reestablish his credibility as a live performer. Before the show, Smith scrawled "Kali – the Destroyer" (the Hindu goddess associated with time and change) in large block letters with permanent ink on his left arm, which was visible to the crowd during the performance. On several songs, he was backed by a stripped-down drum kit played by Robin Peringer (of the band 764-HERO), and members of opening band Rilo Kiley contributed backing vocals to one song. Near the end of the first show, the musician responded for several minutes after a heckler yelled "Get a backbone". Smith played two more Los Angeles concerts that year: The Derby in May 2003, and the L.A. Weekly Music Awards in June 2003.

After his 34th birthday on August 6, 2003, he gave up alcohol. Director Mike Mills had been working with Smith during his final years and described Smith's troubles and apparent recovery: "I gave the script to him, then he dropped off the face of the earth ... he went through his whole crazy time, but by the time I was done with the film, he was making From a Basement on the Hill and I was shocked that he was actually making music."

"Shooting Star"
Sample of Elliott Smith's "Shooting Star" appearing on the posthumously released From a Basement on the Hill (2004), showing a dissonant passage on distorted guitar, an example of Smith's experimentation with different sounds and a "more noisy" style before he died

With things improving for Smith after several troubled years, he began experimenting with noise music and worked on his girlfriend Jennifer Chiba's iMac with the intent of learning how to record with computers, noting that it was the only method with which he was still unfamiliar. Smith jokingly labeled his experimental way of recording "The California Frown" (a play on the Beach Boys' "California Sound"). He said "They're kind of more noisy with the pitch all distorted. Some are more acoustic, but there aren't too many like that. Lately I've just been making up a lot of noise."

He was also in the process of recording songs for the Thumbsucker soundtrack, including Big Star's "Thirteen" and Cat Stevens's "Trouble". In August 2003, Suicide Squeeze Records put out a limited-edition vinyl single for "Pretty (Ugly Before)", a song that Smith had been playing since the Figure 8 tour. Smith's final show was at Redfest at the University of Utah in Salt Lake City on September 19, 2003. The final song he performed live was "Long, Long, Long" by the Beatles.

=== 2004–present: Posthumous releases ===
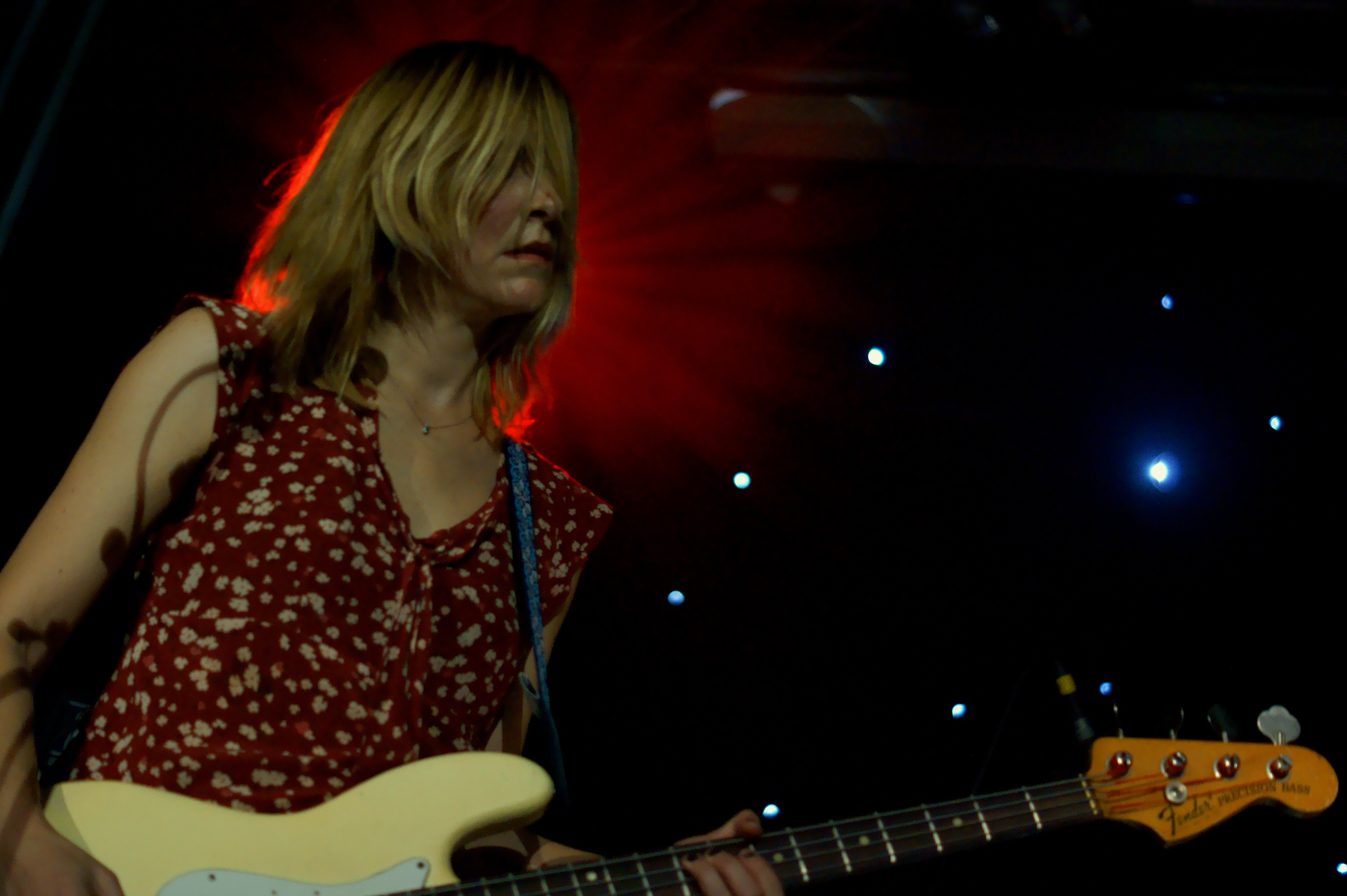
Joanna Bolme helped bring From a Basement on the Hill to completion in the wake of Smith's death.

From a Basement on the Hill, almost four years in production, was released on October 19, 2004, by ANTI- Records (a part of Epitaph Records). With Smith's family in control of his estate, they chose to bring in Rob Schnapf and Smith's ex-girlfriend Joanna Bolme to sort through the recordings and mix the album. Although Smith had voiced his desire for it to be a double album or a regular album with a bonus disc, it was not clear whether it would have been possible for him to release it that way had he completed it. As completed by Schnapf and Bolme, it was released as a 15-track single album. Many songs from the sessions (later leaked onto the Internet) were not included, such as "True Love", "Everything's OK", "Stickman", and "Suicide Machine" (a reworking of the Figure 8-era unreleased instrumental "Tiny Time Machine"). There has been unconfirmed speculation that Smith's family made the decision not to include some songs on the record due to their lyrical content, although songs such as "King's Crossing" that deal with darker subjects did make the album.

Elliott Smith and the Big Nothing, a biography by Benjamin Nugent, was rushed to publication shortly after From a Basement on the Hill, shortly after the first anniversary of his death. Smith's family, as well as Joanna Bolme, Jennifer Chiba, Neil Gust, Sam Coomes, and Janet Weiss, all declined to be interviewed. It contained interviews with Rob Schnapf, David McConnell, and Pete Krebs. The book received mixed reviews, with Publishers Weekly remarking that while "Nugent manages to patch together the major beats of Smith's life, he can offer little meaningful insight".

In 2005, a tribute album, A Tribute to Elliott Smith, was released. It featured various bands performing tributes to Smith. On May 8, 2007, a posthumous compilation album, New Moon, was released by Kill Rock Stars. It contained 24 songs recorded by Smith between 1994 and 1997 during his tenure with the label, songs that were not included on albums, as well as a few early versions and previously released B-sides. In the United States, the album debuted at number 24 on the Billboard 200, selling about 24,000 copies in its first week. The record received favorable reviews and was Metacritic's 15th best-reviewed album of 2007. A portion of the proceeds from album sales were to go to Outside In, a social service agency for low-income adults and homeless youth in Portland, Oregon.

On October 25, 2007, a book titled Elliott Smith was released by Autumn de Wilde, which consists of photographs, handwritten lyrics, and "revealing talks with Smith's inner circle". De Wilde was responsible for the Figure 8 sleeve art, making a landmark and de facto Smith memorial of the Solutions Audio mural. A five-song CD featuring previously unreleased live recordings of Smith performing acoustically at Largo in Los Angeles was included in the release.

Following Smith's death, his estate licensed his songs for use in film and television projects such as One Tree Hill, The Girl Next Door, Georgia Rule, and Paranoid Park. In a March 2009 interview, Larry Crane said that Smith's estate was defunct and all rights previously held by Smith are now in the control of his parents. Crane went on to say that his parents own the rights to Smith's high school recordings, some of the Heatmiser material, all solo songs recorded until his 1998 record deal with DreamWorks Records, and From a Basement on the Hill. DreamWorks Records was acquired by Universal Music Group in 2003, and Interscope Records currently "owns all studio and live recording from Jan 1998 to his passing, except for the songs on From a Basement on the Hill."

In December 2009, Kill Rock Stars announced that it had obtained the rights to re-release Roman Candle and From a Basement on the Hill, originally released by Cavity Search and ANTI-, respectively. Roman Candle would be remastered by Larry Crane. Along with the press release, Kill Rock Stars posted a previously unreleased track of Smith's, titled "Cecilia/Amanda", as a free download. Roman Candle and From a Basement on the Hill were re-released on April 6, 2010, in the US.

A greatest hits compilation titled An Introduction to... Elliott Smith was released in November 2010 by Domino Records (UK) and Kill Rock Stars (US).

In August 2013, there was a memorial concert in Portland, Oregon, and three other cities. Attending the Portland show were several musicians Smith had performed with, friends, and an appearance by film director Gus Van Sant.

In 2014, the director Paul Thomas Anderson posted a video of the pilot episode for a show called The Jon Brion Show, featuring an acoustic set by Smith including accompaniment by Brion and pianist Brad Mehldau.

On July 17, 2015, a documentary about Smith's life titled Heaven Adores You saw a limited theatrical release. The documentary enlisted a number of close friends and family members, as well as hours of audio interviews throughout Smith's short career. The film was directed by Nickolas Rossi and released through Eagle Rock Entertainment. Heaven Adores You received positive reviews from Consequence of Sound, The Guardian, and The Hollywood Reporter.

On August 6, 2019 (what would have been Smith's 50th birthday), UMe released digital deluxe editions of the two albums XO and Figure 8. The new edition of XO has nine added tracks, including Smith's Oscar-nominated Good Will Hunting song "Miss Misery". Seven tracks have been added to Figure 8. The digital deluxe edition includes "Figure 8"—Smith's cover of the "Schoolhouse Rock!" song—which was originally released only on the Japanese edition of the album. The final track on the new Figure 8 edition is Smith's cover of the Beatles' "Because", originally featured on the 1999 American Beauty soundtrack. In May 2021, Smith's life and work were the subject of BBC Radio 4's Great Lives.

== Death ==
Smith died on October 21, 2003, at the age of 34 from two stab wounds to the chest. At the time of the stabbing, he was at his Lemoyne Street home in Echo Park, Los Angeles, where he lived with his girlfriend, Jennifer Chiba. According to Chiba, the two were arguing, and she locked herself in the bathroom to take a shower. Chiba heard him scream and upon opening the door saw Smith standing with a knife in his chest. She pulled the knife out, after which he collapsed and she called 9-1-1 at 12:18 pm. Smith died in the hospital, with the time of death listed as 1:36 p.m. A possible suicide note, written on a sticky note, read: "I'm so sorry—love, Elliott. God forgive me." The coroner misspelled Smith's first name in the autopsy report, omitting the second 't'. While Smith's death was reported as a suicide, the official autopsy report released in December 2003 left open the question of homicide.

Smith's remains were cremated, and his ashes were divided between his mother, father, and half-sister Ashley. A small memorial service for family and friends was held at his father's home in Portland, although Smith's "ashes weren't on hand because the coroner wouldn't release them." The status or location of Smith's ashes has not been made public.

According to Pitchfork, record producer Larry Crane reported on his Tape Op message board that he had planned to help Smith mix his album in mid-November. Crane wrote, "I hadn't talked to Elliott in over a year. His girlfriend, Jennifer, called me [last week] and asked if I'd like to come to L.A. and help mix and finish [Smith's album]. I said 'yes, of course', and chatted with Elliott for the first time in ages. It seems surreal that he would call me to finish an album and then a week later kill himself. I talked to Jennifer this morning, who was obviously shattered and in tears, and she said, 'I don't understand, he was so healthy.'" The coroner reported that no traces of illegal substances or alcohol were found in Smith's system at the time of his death but did find prescribed levels of antidepressant, anxiolytic, and ADHD medications, including clonazepam, mirtazapine, atomoxetine, and amphetamine. There were no hesitation wounds. Due to the inconclusive autopsy ruling, the Los Angeles Police Department's investigation remains open.

Smith received a letter from his step-father, Charlie Welch, on the day he died, but did not get the chance to read it. In the letter, Welch denies having urges to sexually abuse anyone after Smith's allegations of repeated childhood sexual abuse from him but apologised for general mistreatment of him and his "deficiencies as a father."

=== Reaction ===
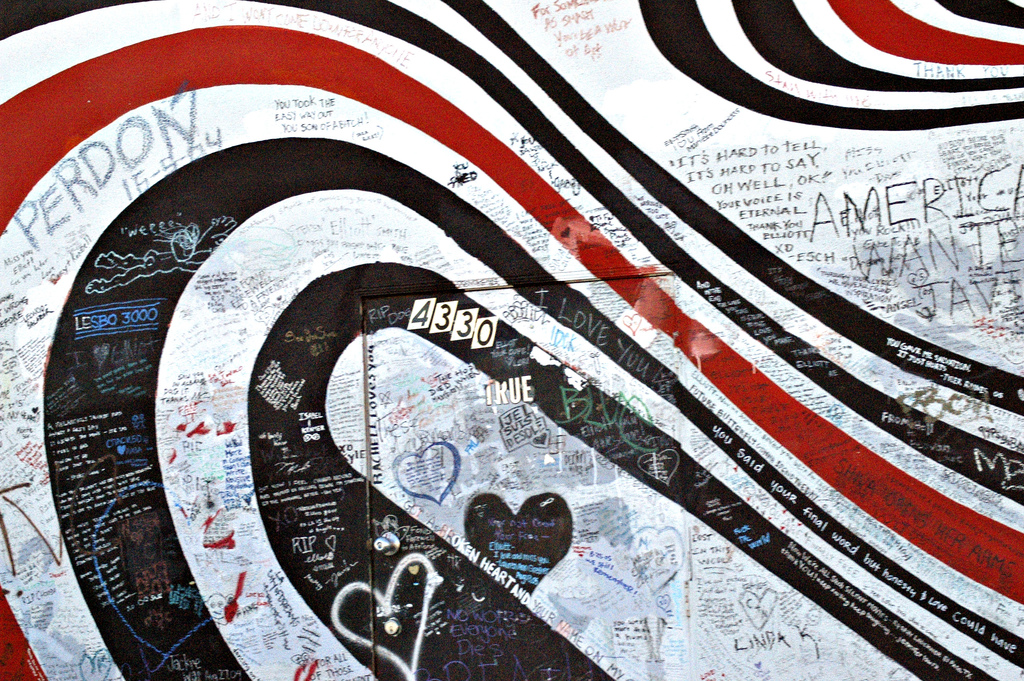
The memorial outside Solutions Audio in Los Angeles, California, in August 2006

Shortly after Smith's death, a fan memorial was initiated outside Solutions Audio (4334 Sunset Boulevard, Los Angeles, California), the site at which the cover of the Figure 8 album was shot. Farewell messages to Smith were written on the wall, and flowers, photos, candles, and empty bottles of alcohol mentioned in Smith's songs were left. Since then, the wall has been a regular target for graffiti and has often then been repainted by fans, covering many of the personal messages. Later, in 2017, part of the wall was replaced with a window and moved inside the building.

Memorial concerts were held in several cities in the United States and the United Kingdom. A petition was soon put forth with intent to make part of the Silver Lake area a memorial park in Smith's honor. It received over 10,000 signatures, but no plans to establish the park have been announced. A memorial plaque located inside Smith's former high school, Lincoln High, was hung in July 2006. The plaque reads: "I'm never going to know you now, but I'm going to love you anyhow" referencing Smith's song "Waltz No. 2 (XO)".

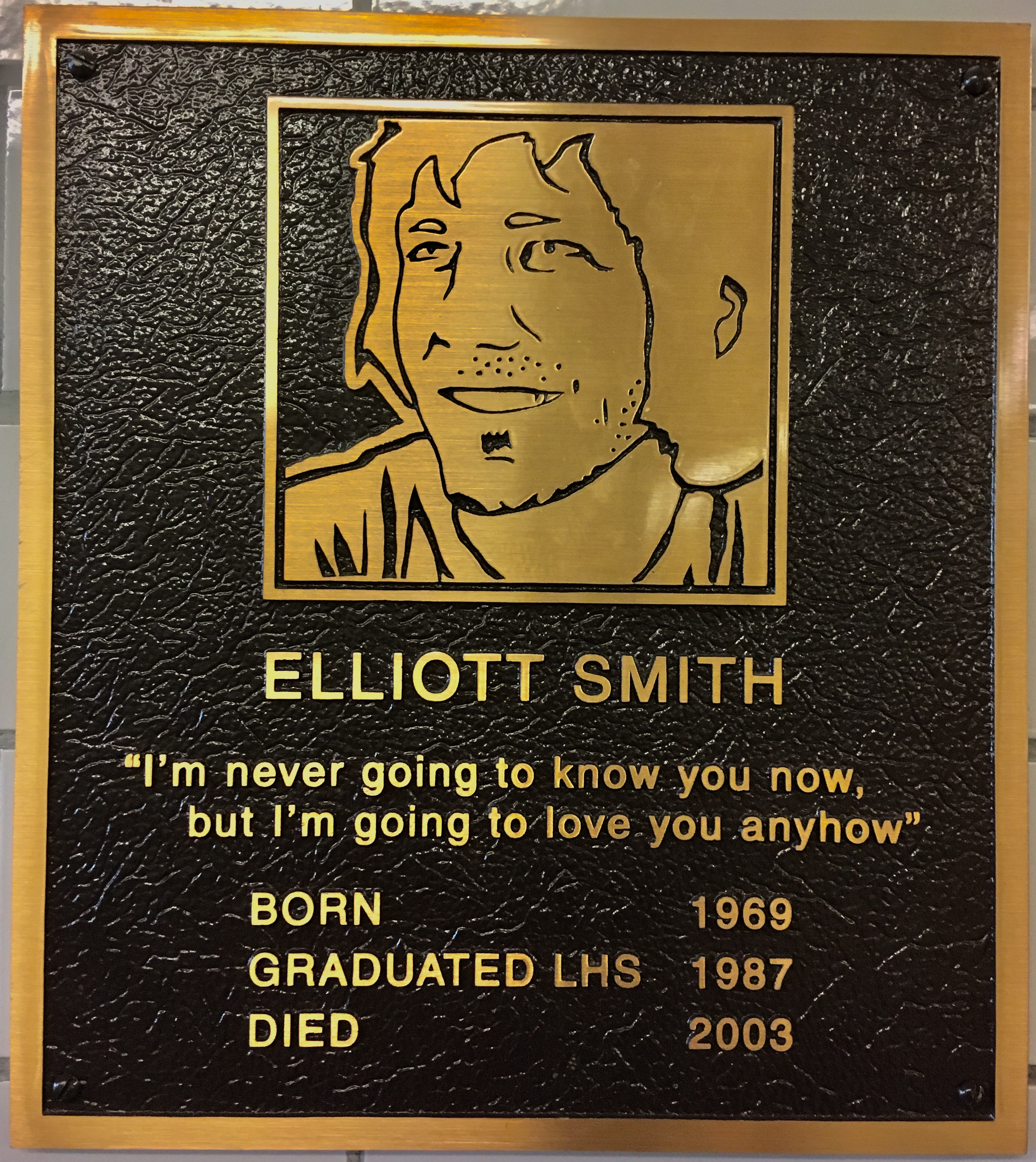
Memorial for Smith at the high school from which he graduated; lyrics from his song "Waltz No. 2 (XO)" are inscribed upon it.

Since Smith's death, many musical acts have paid him tribute. Songs in tribute to, or about, Smith have been released by Pearl Jam ("Can't Keep" on the Live at Benaroya Hall concert album); Sparta ("Bombs and Us"); Third Eye Blind ("There's No Hurry to Eternity", originally titled "Elliott Smith", on the Live from Nowhere Near You, Volume Two: Pacific Northwest compilation); 9 Horses ("listening to the Elliott Smith discography in reverse order", on the album Perfectest Herald); Ben Folds ("Late" on Songs for Silverman); Brad Mehldau ("Sky Turning Grey (for Elliott Smith)" on Highway Rider); Rilo Kiley ("It Just Is", and "Ripchord" from the album More Adventurous); Lil B's 'The Worlds Ending'; Rhett Miller ("The Believer" on The Believer); Earlimart ("Heaven Adores You" on Treble and Tremble); Joan As Police Woman ("We Don't Own It" on Real Life); Phoebe Bridgers ("Punisher" on Punisher); and Pete Yorn ("Bandstand in the Sky" on Nightcrawler, a song jointly dedicated to Jeff Buckley). Several tribute albums have been released since his death, including Christopher O'Riley's 2006 Home to Oblivion: An Elliott Smith Tribute, with 18 instrumental covers, The Portland Cello Project's 2014 to e.s., covering six of his songs, Seth Avett and Jessica Lea Mayfield's 2015 Seth Avett and Jessica Lea Mayfield Sing Elliott Smith, with 12 covers incorporating Smith's musical style and their own, and To Elliott, from Portland containing covers by a number of Portland bands. Singer Madonna covered his 1997 song "Between the Bars" in 2017.

On July 30, 2004, Chiba filed a lawsuit against the Smith family for 15% of his earnings (over $1 million), claiming that she and Smith lived as "husband and wife", that Smith had pledged to take care of her financially for the rest of her life, and that she worked as his manager and agent from around 2000 until his death. A state labor commissioner ruled her claim as manager to be invalid, as she had worked as an "unlicensed talent agent" under California's Talent Agencies Act. The case made it to the California appellate court in October 2007, but the decision was affirmed 2–1.

In an October 2013 Spin magazine article—a reflection at the tenth anniversary of Smith's death—drummer McPherson stated that Smith was "a sick man without his medicine" during the last 31 days of his life, when he was not only sober, but had also given up red meat and sugar. In the same article, Chiba recalls thinking, "Okay, you're asking a lot of yourself. You're giving up a lot at once." Chiba further explained that "anyone who understands drug abuse knows that you use drugs to hide from your past or sedate yourself from strong, overwhelming feelings. So when you're newly clean and coming off the medications that have been masking all those feelings, that's when you're the most vulnerable." Writing for Spin, Liam Gowing also encountered a local musician who claimed Smith had said to him: "The people who try to intervene, they're good people who genuinely care about you. But they don't know what you're going through. Do what you need to do." According to the musician, Smith had adamantly dissuaded him from suicide.

== Musical style and influences ==
Smith respected and was inspired by many artists and styles, including the Beatles, Big Star, the Clash, the Who, Led Zeppelin, the Kinks, Pink Floyd, Rush, Bauhaus, Elvis Costello, Oasis, Television, Motown and flamenco records, AC/DC, Hank Williams, Scorpions, Fugazi, and Built to Spill. Smith mentioned his admiration for Bob Dylan in several interviews, citing him as an early influence. He once commented: "My father taught me how to play 'Don't Think Twice, It's All Right'. I love Dylan's words, but even more than that, I love the fact that he loves words." Smith covered Dylan's "When I Paint My Masterpiece" several times in concert. Smith also had an early connection to classical music, recalling that he was playing works by Sergei Rachmaninoff after only a year of piano lessons as a child.

Smith has also been compared to folk singer Nick Drake, due to his fingerpicking style and vocals. Darryl Cater of AllMusic called references to "the definitive folk loner" Drake "inevitable", and Smith's lyrics have been compared to those in Drake's album Pink Moon.

Smith was a dedicated fan of the Beatles (as well as their solo projects), once noting that he had been listening to them frequently since he was about "four years old" and also claimed that hearing the White Album was his original inspiration to become a musician. In 1998, Smith contributed a cover of the Beatles song "Because" to the closing credits and soundtrack of the film American Beauty. Although this was the only Beatles song that Smith ever officially released, he is known to have recorded many others, ("Revolution", "I'll Be Back" and "I'm So Tired") and played many songs by both the band and the members' solo projects at live concerts.

Smith said that his chord progressions were his favorite part of songs and that he preferred to write broader, more impressionistic music closer to pop rather than folk music. Smith compared his songs to stories or dreams, not purely confessional pieces that people could relate to. When asked about the dark nature of his songwriting and the cult following he was gaining, Smith said he felt it was merely a product of his writing songs that were strongly meaningful to him rather than anything contrived. Larry Crane, Smith's posthumous archivist, has said that he was surprised at the amount of "recycling of musical ideas" he encountered while cataloging Smith's private tapes: "I found songs recorded in high school reworked 15 years on. Lyrics became more important to him as he became older, and more time was spent working on them."

Smith's early albums were acoustic solo albums where he recorded all of the instruments by himself (with less than ideal equipment), which music journalists have said created a "homemade atmosphere" that augmented his "existential lyrics".

== Legacy ==
Since his death, Smith has been regarded as one of the most influential artists in indie music. Many artists have either cited Smith as an influence or covered his music, including Frank Ocean, Beck, Phoebe Bridgers, Julien Baker, Adrianne Lenker, Alex G, Beabadoobee, Ben Gibbard of Death Cab for Cutie, Danielle Haim of Haim, Madonna, Billie Eilish, Phil Elverum of The Microphones, Clairo, and Brad Mehldau.

In 2026, the minor planet (861969) Elliottsmith was named in honor of Smith.

== Discography ==
Studio albums

- Roman Candle (1994)
- Elliott Smith (1995)
- Either/Or (1997)
- XO (1998)
- Figure 8 (2000)
- From a Basement on the Hill (2004)

== See also ==
- List of unsolved deaths
