= Miss Misery =

Single by Elliott Smith

from the album Good Will Hunting: Music from the Miramax Motion Picture
- Released: December 7, 1997
- Recorded: 1997
- Genre: Indie rock; pop
- Length: 3:15
- Label: Capitol Records
- Songwriter: Elliott Smith

Elliott Smith singles chronology
"Needle in the Hay" (1995)	"Miss Misery" (1997)	"Waltz #2 (XO)" (1998)

"Miss Misery" is a song by American singer-songwriter Elliott Smith. Featured in the closing credits and the soundtrack of the 1997 film Good Will Hunting, the song was nominated for Best Original Song in the 1998 Academy Awards.

A previous version of "Miss Misery" with different lyrics was recorded in Jackpot! Recording Studio in early 1997 and appears on the 2007 posthumous collection New Moon, with the full version appearing on the Deluxe Edition of XO. The Good Will Hunting version was re-cut at Jackpot!

== Music video ==
A music video was directed by Ross Harris, and features Smith walking around in a white suit, being followed by a policeman. The musician inserts change into expired parking meters so the policeman cannot write up tickets. The video was shot in the Silverlake neighborhood of Los Angeles; it opens in front of the Smog Cutter dive bar, then follows Smith down both Virgil Avenue and Hoover Street.

One version of the video splices in some footage from Good Will Hunting.

== Performances ==
On March 5, 1998, Smith performed "Miss Misery" solo on acoustic guitar on Late Night with Conan O'Brien.

On March 23, 1998, Smith played an abridged version of the song at the 70th Academy Awards, accompanied by the house orchestra. Following the "shocking" nomination for the Academy Award for Best Original Song, Smith had to be convinced by the producers to perform the song at the ceremony, as he had not intended to do so. They informed him that his song would be played live that night, whether by him or by another musician of their choosing. They also reportedly rejected his style of performing sitting in a chair. Before the ceremony, Smith, responding to a reporter's question, said, "Mainly I just want to go so I can wear my white suit. I always have a great time when I wear my white suit." When Madonna announced "My Heart Will Go On" as the winner, she sarcastically remarked, "What a shocker!" She later said that she greatly admired Elliott Smith. Afterwards, Smith described the experience as "surreal" and "ridiculous, but at a certain point I threw myself into it because it seemed to make my friends happy... I walked out and Jack Nicholson was sitting about six feet away, so I avoided that area and I looked up at the balcony in the back and sang the song."

In 1998, Smith performed the song on MTV.

Although he would play "Miss Misery" in various shows throughout his career, Smith would often avoid playing it or talking about it. It was not heavily requested compared to his other songs, and in one show he dedicated it to the audience.
