= Elliott Smith (album) =

Studio album by Elliott Smith
- Released: July 21, 1995
- Recorded: September 1994 at Tony Lash's house; January–February 1995 at Leslie Uppinghouse's house
- Genres: Indie folk; folk-punk; lo-fi
- Length: 37:57
- Label: Kill Rock Stars
- Producer: Elliott Smith

Elliott Smith chronology
Roman Candle (1994)	Elliott Smith (1995)	Either/Or (1997)

Singles from Elliott Smith
- 1. "Needle in the Hay" Released: January 1, 1995

Elliott Smith is the second studio album by the American singer-songwriter of the same name. It was recorded from late 1994 to early 1995, and released on July 21, 1995, through Kill Rock Stars, his first album on the label. It was preceded by the single "Needle in the Hay", released in early January 1995.

== Background ==
After being impressed by Smith, Mary Lou Lord invited him to tour with her, and helped him to sign to Kill Rock Stars.

== Content ==
The album is of a similar musical style to Roman Candle in its minimalist, acoustic folk sound. Smith mostly appears alone on his acoustic guitar, although he is occasionally backed up by the odd musical instrument, such as a harmonica and drums. Rolling Stone wrote of the album, "the music burrows, digging up gems of structure, melody and lyrical vividness that belie his naïve delivery [...] the sound is hummable pop, slowed and drugged, with tricky but unshowy guitar work driving the melodies forward".

The album's lyrics contain many references to drug use, which Smith claimed were merely metaphorical.

The lyrics also contain references to Portland's Foster-Powell neighborhood, St. Ides malt liquor, and Alphabet City, Manhattan and the borough of Queens in New York City.

The song "Clementine" is a reworking of the 19th-century American western folk ballad "Oh My Darling, Clementine", which Smith referenced again in a later song, "Sweet Adeline", released on XO (1998).

The song "Christian Brothers" was also performed with Heatmiser in a full-band arrangement, recorded around the same time as the version featured on Elliott Smith; Heatmiser's version was released on the soundtrack of Heaven Adores You, a 2014 documentary about Smith's life and music.

Thematically, Smith said that he "personally can't get more dark" than his self-titled album.

== Album artwork ==
The album cover depicts two figures falling or jumping from a building. It is a xeroxed copy of a photograph taken by J.J. Gonson of a 1992 art installation at the former Museum of Modern Art in Old Town, Prague. The falling figures are the work of Czech sculptor Kurt Gebauer. Gonson also photographed the cover for Roman Candle.

== Release ==
"Needle in the Hay", the album's only single, was released in early January 1995.

Elliott Smith was released on July 21, 1995, through Kill Rock Stars, making it his first full-length album on the label. In contrast to Roman Candle, Elliott Smith was "promoted heavily", with posters of Smith appearing in the windows of record stores across the Northwest District of Portland, Oregon, where Smith lived at the time.

The album was reissued in a remastered and expanded 25th anniversary edition on August 28, 2020. The release also features a live album, Live at Umbra Penumbra, a 1994 performance at a Portland café, thought to be the earliest-known live recording of Smith performing as a solo artist. As part of the anniversary edition, J.J. Gonson, the artist behind the Elliott Smith album cover, released a 52-page coffee table book with handwritten lyrics, words from Smith's peers about the album's creation, and a series of previously unseen photographs. Gonson released a series of photo prints of Smith, one per month through August 2020, available for purchase through Morrison Hotel Gallery.

Of the reissue, Kill Rock Stars co-founder Slim Moon said:

"I've always felt like this record is underappreciated. A lot of people overlook Elliott's first two records—they think of them as a prelude to the bigger albums that followed—but when you go back, you discover they're really great. This is Elliott's most fragile and delicate music, and we wanted to honor that with a special and beautiful package."

== Reception ==
Professional ratings
Review scores
Source	Rating
AllMusic	4.5/5 stars
The Guardian	4/5 stars
The Irish Times	3/5 stars
NME	7/10
Pitchfork	9.5/10
The Rolling Stone Album Guide	5/5 stars

While not believed to have been reviewed by many, if any, critics at the time of its release, Elliott Smith has been critically well-received retrospectively. Steve Huey of AllMusic wrote "Elliott Smith contains the blueprint for his later successes, and more importantly, it's a fully-realized work itself." Trouser Press described it as "bleak, almost uncomfortably unsparing and yet tragically beautiful", and that "the songs, melodies, arrangements and production are all stronger and more fully realized than those on Roman Candle".

== Legacy ==
Pitchfork rated "Needle in the Hay" No. 27 on their 2010 list of the best songs of the 1990s, and the album itself No. 50 on their 2022 list of the best albums of the 1990s.

"Needle in the Hay" appeared in Wes Anderson's 2001 film The Royal Tenenbaums, in a scene featuring a suicide attempt by Richie Tenenbaum (Luke Wilson). Smith was reportedly unhappy about the song being used this way. The song appeared on the film's soundtrack.

"Christian Brothers" has been covered by Queens of the Stone Age on the Canadian tour limited edition of their 2007 album Era Vulgaris, with frontman Josh Homme emphasizing how much he loves the song. Paste named it one of the best 100 songs of the 1990s.

Rolling Stone described Smith as "ferociously talented", and the music as "some of the loveliest songs about the dissolution of a soul ever written [...] hypnotic and terribly, unrelentingly sad".

== Track listing ==
All tracks are written by Elliott Smith.

No.	Title	Length
1.	"Needle in the Hay"	4:16
2.	"Christian Brothers"	4:30
3.	"Clementine"	2:46
4.	"Southern Belle"	3:06
5.	"Single File"	2:26
6.	"Coming Up Roses"	3:10
7.	"Satellite"	2:25
8.	"Alphabet Town"	4:11
9.	"St. Ides Heaven"	3:00
10.	"Good to Go"	2:24
11.	"The White Lady Loves You More"	2:24
12.	"The Biggest Lie"	2:39
Total length:		37:57

== Personnel ==
- Elliott Smith – vocals, acoustic guitars, drums (2, 6, 9), electric guitar (6, 7, 10), tambourine (3), air organ (6), harmonica (8), cello (11)

Additional personnel

- Neil Gust – electric guitar ("Single File"), sleeve photography
- Rebecca Gates – backing vocals ("St. Ides Heaven")

Technical

- Leslie Uppinghouse – mixing assistance
- Tony Lash – mixing assistance
- J.J. Gonson – cover photography
