= Heatmiser =

American rock band

- Heatmiser publicity photo for Frontier Records. From left: Tony Lash, Elliott Smith, Brandt Peterson, and Neil Gust.

Background information
- Origin: Portland, Oregon, U.S.
- Genres: Indie rock; indie pop; alternative rock; post-hardcore
- Years active: 1991–1996
- Labels: Cavity Search; Frontier; Virgin; Caroline
- Past members: Elliott Smith; Neil Gust; Tony Lash; Brandt Peterson; Sam Coomes; Jason Hornick; John Moen

Heatmiser was an American rock band, formed in Portland, Oregon, in October 1991. Consisting of Elliott Smith (guitar and vocals), Neil Gust (guitar and vocals), Brandt Peterson (bass; later replaced by Sam Coomes, frontman of Quasi) and Tony Lash (drums), they were known for their well-crafted lyrics and songs often featuring the juxtaposition of melancholic and cheery words and melodies. Smith's pop-oriented songs provided a contrast to Gust's darker compositions, yet both songwriters explored themes such as anger, alienation, loneliness and despair.

== History ==
=== Pre-Heatmiser early years (1987–1990) ===
In 1987, while both of them were attending classes at Hampshire College in Amherst, Massachusetts, Neil Gust and Elliott Smith met and formed a band, Swimming Jesus. In addition to covers of songs by Ringo Starr and Elvis Costello, the pair performed original songs in clubs in nearby Northampton. The two were prolific: besides Swimming Jesus, Gust and Smith had another pre-Heatmiser college band, featuring "a friend named Dylan and two others", and recorded "stupid and embarrassing" music on rented four-track recorders with "poetry on top", recited by a "Southern Californian stoner-photographer guy" friend.

=== Heatmiser early years: Dead Air and Cop and Speeder (1991–1993) ===
Following their graduation from Hampshire College in 1991, Gust and Smith returned to Portland, Oregon. In Portland, Gust and Smith formed Heatmiser with Smith's high school friend Tony Lash, who'd been working at a recording studio and playing drums in local band Nero's Rome. Early versions of Heatmiser included Jason Hornick, who, like Lash, had also played in Smith's high school band Stranger Than Fiction. In high school, Lash and Smith played together in the school band—Lash played flute, Smith played clarinet—and Lash played drums in Smith's band Stranger Than Fiction. Lash and Smith had bonded over a mutual love of Rush, and outside of their high school band class, they began to work out "insanely complicated songs" together, recording after school with Eric Hedford, future Dandy Warhols drummer. Tony Lash recalled about recording with Hedford: "We recorded all the backing band tracks for [Stranger Than Fiction's] Still Waters More or Less at Eric Hedford's house in 1985–86. He had a basement with drums, mics, a piano, and a mixer. He helped us set up, but he didn't play on any of it."

With Heatmiser in need of a bassist, a high school friend suggested Brandt Peterson to fill the position. Peterson had played in a few punk bands, but "was feeling ambivalent about another." Smith convinced him to join Heatmiser, at least until their February 14, 1992 live debut at Portland's X-Ray Cafe. Over the next few years, Heatmiser was a regular act at local Portland venues like the X-Ray Cafe, screenprinting shop Hand Prints, and La Luna, whose cheap, packed Monday night concerts were a hub for the city's twenty-something underground social scene. Peterson played bass on the albums Dead Air and Cop and Speeder, the Yellow No. 5 EP, and several singles. He wrote at least two songs for Heatmiser: "Just a Little Prick", released on The Music of Heatmiser, and "Glamourine", a "bass-line with lyrics" that remains unreleased. Peterson did a cover design for the Yellow No. 5 EP that ultimately wasn't used; additionally, he did the cover art for Dead Air.

=== Later years: line-up changes and Mic City Sons (1994–1996) ===
Peterson left the band in August 1994 and was replaced by Sam Coomes, a friend of Smith's. Coomes played on Heatmiser's last album, Mic City Sons, and on tour. Coomes has a modest view of his contributions to the album: "There's two levels of playing for me [on Mic City Sons]," he added, laughing. "Decent and could be better." After Peterson's departure, the band "struggled [on tour] to draw the same crowds they'd built in Portland. They played wherever they could, even a laundromat."

Discussing the tension in the band, Peterson recalled, "Every individual in the band had identities that were bound up with some sense of injuries, of not fitting in or whatever. I didn't really understand myself really well, I drank pretty heavily. And Elliott was increasingly unhappy with the rock thing, and I think that I became emblematic of everything that was bad about that for him."

Lash also recalled his memories of the band's tense relationship while recording Mic City Sons, and their eventual breakup, stating, "At the time, it was hard to sort through it all. It's the kind of things [that], maybe if these issues came up when people are in their 30s or 40s and have some better communication skills, wouldn't be so hard to process."

Lash left Heatmiser in late 1996, prior to what would be their final tour. John Moen (later of The Decemberists) was brought in to play drums.

Regarding Mic City Sons, Coomes said, "There's a song called 'See You Later' on [the album]... I remember hearing that song for the first time and telling Elliott, 'This song's going to buy you a house.' Houses were cheaper in those days." Lash recalled, "Neil's stuff on that last record was really strong. [Smith and Gust's] relationship to each other was good for both of their songwriting." Gust stated, "I hope that it doesn't sound dated. We loved it when it was done. We worked on it until we could say that we loved it."

=== Disbandment ===
The band broke up in the fall of 1996, prior to the release of their third and last album, Mic City Sons. "It was kind of ridiculous to carry it up to a certain point and then drop the ball or the bomb, like quitting the band right after we had signed to Virgin," recalled Smith. "I was the guy who made that gravy-train crash so to speak, and it was a gravy-train at the time. The breakup happened almost immediately after the contract was signed. I watched myself put my paw in the bear trap on that one because there was this clause about leaving members. In the event of the band dissolving, any members could be kept to that contract with or without their consent under the same terms. They didn't pick up Neil's option, only mine. It turned out to be a fucked-up situation because they said the reason they had signed Heatmiser was that they'd been hoping this [the breakup] would happen-or something to that effect. They said that right in front of Neil and I couldn't believe it."

The recording sessions for Mic City Sons also "found the band dissolving. Smith had his solo career to tend. Gust spent time in the house [the band had rented for recording] alone, learning to work the studio; as engineer, Lash felt he'd become an 'obstacle' to Smith, who wanted to bring in Beck producers Rob Schnapf and Tom Rothrock to shepherd the sessions. The buffer of the new producers helped bring the album together, but at some point in 1996, the band fell apart. Mic City Sons was released on a smaller Virgin sister label, Caroline, and slipped into the world quietly."

Going on unemployment after losing a bakery side-job had given Smith more time to devote to recording, which also shifted his focus away from Heatmiser and toward his own solo music endeavors. Gust recalled: "That was like the state giving [him] a grant because for a year, he didn't work. All he did was record at his girlfriend's house. His process just went 'boom!' It was amazing to watch. It was also intimidating because I was working, we had the band and there [were] things to deal with the band, but he just drifted into his own thing."

Despite Smith's burgeoning solo career, there wasn't tension between him and Gust. "There was never any animosity between me and him about it, because it was art," Gust said. "It only became problematic with scheduling stuff, if the band needed to go on tour or something. He had to give up on doing some things on his own to do it with the band and became less and less willing to do that."

After Heatmiser's breakup, Smith and Lash "didn't talk for a couple years," Lash said, but they reconnected in London in 1999, as Smith toured for XO at the height of his post-Oscars fame, with Coomes in [his] backing band. And Gust had a new project, No. 2, that brought Smith and Lash together again. "We hung out a little bit when he was working on the first No. 2 record. I started to get a feeling like, 'Oh, you know, even if it wasn't Heatmiser...' It was fun to think about the possibility of maybe doing something with him. So it was hard when that door was closed."

Gust went on to play in the band No. 2. Coomes carried on as half of Quasi, as well as working as a guest musician and producer for other bands, including Built to Spill, Sleater-Kinney, and Bugskull. Lash worked as a producer. He produced the first two albums by The Dandy Warhols and he helped with the production of Death Cab for Cutie's first two studio albums (Something About Airplanes and We Have the Facts and We're Voting Yes). Peterson teaches anthropology at Michigan State University. Smith went on to a successful solo career before his death on October 21, 2003.

Gust has said that the last time that he saw Smith, in 2002, Smith said he wanted to make another Heatmiser record. The pair recorded just one new song together, "Who's Behind the Door?" Gust recalled how "Who's Behind the Door?" came together in the studio and how that was the last session he shared with Smith before his passing in 2003:

"Who's Behind the Door?" was one of four new songs No. 2 played on what turned out to be our final tour. Elliott came to our show in L.A. at The Troubadour and offered to record us at the studio he was putting together for himself [New Monkey Studio] in the Valley. We showed up, tracked the basics for two songs in one day, then Jim [Talstra] and John [Moen] packed up and headed back to Portland. I stayed for what I thought was going to be a couple days of overdubs. Instead, I was there for two weeks trying to finish one song. Elliott finished the mix long after I returned to Portland in order to keep my job, but I didn't hear it until after he died. This recording session was the last time I saw him.

== Artistry ==
=== Musical style ===
Heatmiser was labeled as a "homocore" or "queercore" band by the mainstream press, because of the themes espoused in the songs of the openly gay Gust. It was also speculated that Gust and Smith were lovers. Smith repeatedly denied this in interviews or that he was even gay. Smith also said that Gust's being gay was "not a big deal, [nor] anyone's business".

Smith later dismissed the group's music as "loud", and his own singing on their first album as "an embarrassment". Smith also bemoaned that being in Heatmiser changed the songs he was writing at the time into "loud rock songs with no dynamic." Heatmiser also frustrated the members of the band. In an interview, Smith recalled:

I was being a total actor, acting out a role I didn't even like. I couldn't come out and show where I was coming from. I was always disguised in this loud rock band. [In the beginning] we all got together, everyone wanted to play in a band and it was fun, then after a couple of years we realized that none of us really liked this kind of music, and that we didn't have to play this way. You didn't have to turn all these songs you wrote into these loud... things. [...] It was kinda weird – people that came to our shows, a majority of them were people I couldn't relate to at all. Why aren't there more people like me coming to our shows? Well, it's because I'm not even playing the kind of music that I really like.

Gust stated that touring behind their first album, Dead Air, meant that Heatmiser "had to be this much more muscular, single-minded kind of band than we really felt any of us were interested in being."

JJ Gonson, Heatmiser's manager (and later, Smith's girlfriend) recalled her impressions of Heatmiser:

The first time I saw Heatmiser was in 1993, at X-Ray in Portland. I had this visceral response, which I've only had with a few bands. I was impressed by every single member. Elliott was clearly an uber-talented songwriter, Neil [Gust] was clearly an almost-as-talented songwriter, and they both had terrific singing voices and were really gifted guitar players. The drummer [Tony Lash] was excellent. There was not a slacker in Heatmiser. Neil and Elliott had very different guitar skills that complemented each other beautifully. In fact, when I met them, I would say that Neil was the more accomplished of the two. But Elliott had a natural aptitude that was unique. He could hear music and make it come out of his fingers in a way that most guitar players can't. He never stumbled. It was like there was a channel that went straight from his brain to his fingers, and that was immediately evident watching him play live. You only see that kind of skill level once in a while, so when you see it, you know it.

Their musical style has been described as indie rock, indie pop, alternative rock, and post-hardcore.

=== Performance style ===
Gonson spoke of the uniqueness of the 1990s Portland music scene in relation to Heatmiser:

A phenomenal thing happened in Portland in the early '90s. At La Luna, someone had this idea to charge one dollar at the door to see three local bands every Monday night. The club capacity was maybe 1,000, and they got to keep the bar, but the bands could sell merchandise and they got 100% of the door. So every Monday night the bands were pretty much guaranteed at least $300—which was huge in 1993—and the shows had Heatmiser, Crackerbash, Pond, Hazel, The Dandy Warhols. It was all local. It sold out every Monday, because nobody had a job, really—this was the early '90s and there was no work. The bands would get their cash and, more importantly, they would have the experience of playing in front of 1,000 people who knew their songs. What you ended up with is these bands that perform really well. Heatmiser were just a phenomenal, rip-your-head-off-and-shove-it-up-your-ass rock band. I saw them hundreds of times. Elliott was so into it; in every photo I took of them onstage from that time, he's biting his lip. The thing I remember most vividly is that he always had this exact same rocking motion in his body language. [Both Neil and Elliott] were writing really good songs, but I immediately recognized that Elliott was writing in a way that maybe... appealed to me more personally? When they did that Yellow No. 5 EP, the song "Idler" might have been around when I started to go 'whoa, whoa, whoa.' That really quiet, haunting thing.

Brendan Benson was the opening act for Heatmiser on their final tour. Reporter Jeff Stark's SF Weekly article about a date on that tour, a December 1, 1996 show at San Francisco's Bottom of the Hill club, recalled Smith as "part charismatic rock star, part bar-band regular, oozing nonchalant confidence".

Heatmiser also had a less-serious side:

Somewhere in the middle of the set the band started goofing off; Gust pushed Smith down in the middle of a song. Later, Heatmiser tossed self-effacing cracks at the audience, perhaps to parody Smith's reputation for despondence. Between songs, bassist Coomes proclaimed, 'We've got Søren Kierkegaard on guitar.' To which Smith jokingly announced, 'This one's called Fear and Trembling.' I suppose I should have known that any band named after the claymation villain in the dated The Year Without a Santa Claus would have a sense of humor.

== Legacy ==
Later in his career, Smith believed that his blatant dismissal of the band in interviews for his solo albums hurt Neil Gust and led to discontent between them. The success of Roman Candle and Elliott Smith caused tensions in the band, especially between Smith and Gust, and led to the band's break-up.

Gust has "the fondest memories" of the band, and he has stated that "[his] view of the legacy of Heatmiser is those records. It was a great time in my life. It's been something that has paid off in my life over and over, far more than it ever paid at the time." Tony Lash also looks back on his time in Heatmiser favorably: "I have a lot of fond memories of that time. Portland still has an extremely vibrant music scene, but there was a bit more of a united, focused community with the bands and the people that came to see music then. La Luna, along with a few other places, was the epicenter of that, the place where the large shows happened. We definitely packed our shows, and people were really into it."

In 2013, photos taken by Gonson of Heatmiser appeared in the Elliott Smith: The Portland Years photo show and series.

== Discography ==
Studio albums

- Dead Air (1993, Frontier Records)
- Cop and Speeder (1994, Frontier Records)
- Mic City Sons (1996, Caroline Records; 2025, Third Man Records (reissue))

EPs

- The Music of Heatmiser (1992, self-released) – available at shows and via mail order; features demo versions of the Dead Air songs "Lowlife", "Bottle Rocket", "Buick", and "Dirt", along with two other songs, "Just a Little Prick" and "Mightier Than You", that are exclusive to this release.
- Yellow No. 5 (1994, Frontier Records)

Compilations

- The Music of Heatmiser (2023, Third Man Records) – collects the Music of Heatmiser EP, demos, live recordings, and other previously unreleased material.

Singles

- "Stray" (1993, Cavity Search Records)
- "Sleeping Pill" (1994, Cavity Search Records)
- "Everybody Has It" (1996, Cavity Search Records)

Live

- Live 1992-11-21, Edgefield, Troutdale, OR (1992) – A live recording of a November 21, 1992 show at the McMenamins Edgefield in Troutdale, Oregon exists and circulates unofficially among Heatmiser/Elliott Smith fans. This show took place as part of a wedding reception for a couple who were friends of the band. The recording features four unknown/unreleased Heatmiser songs, in addition to renditions of songs from Dead Air and the Music of Heatmiser EP. This recording can be downloaded at the Internet Archive.

Appears on

Various-artist compilations

- Live at the X-Ray (song: "Bottle Rocket" (Live Version))
- Puddle Stomp: The Portland Independent Music Compilation (1992, Jump Froggy Jump) (song: "Mightier Than You" (Demo Version))
- CMJ Presents Certain Damage! Volume 47 (1993, College Music Journal) (song: "Still")
- 25 Years on the Edge: A Benefit for Outside In (1994, Tim/Kerr Records) (Song: "Mightier Than You" (Live Version))
- CMJ Certain Damage! Vol. 60 (1994, College Music Journal) (song: "Flame")
- American Pie: New Sounds from the U.S.A. (1994, Rubber Records) (song: "Still")
- Sony Music Regional A&R, June 1994 (1994, Sony Music) (song: "Junior Mint")
- Kamikaze: Music to Push You Over the Edge (1995, Continuum Records) (song: "Stray")
- The 1996 Rubber Records Sampler (1996, Rubber Records) (song: "Disappearing Ink")
- How Low Can a Punk Get? (1996, Caroline Records) (song: "The Fix Is In")
- CMJ New Music Monthly Volume 41: January 1997 (1997, College Music Journal) (song: "Get Lucky")
- Pet Sounds Volume One: A Benefit for ALTER (Animal Liberation Through Education and Reform) (1999, Vital Cog Records) (song: "Junior Mint")
- Experience Music Project Presents Wild and Wooly: The Northwest Rock Collection (2000, Experience Music Project) (song: "Dirt")

Soundtracks

- Zero Effect: Motion Picture Soundtrack (1998, Work Group) (song: "Rest My Head Against the Wall")
- Heaven Adores You Soundtrack (2014, Universal Music Enterprises) (song: "Christian Brothers" (Heatmiser Version))
