= Larry Crane (recording engineer) =

American editor and recording engineer

Larry Crane is an American editor, recording engineer, and archivist based in Portland, Oregon. Crane is the editor and founder of Tape Op magazine, the owner of Portland's Jackpot! Recording Studio, a freelance engineer, and the archivist for the estate of musician Elliott Smith.

== Career ==
Tape Op was started in 1996.

From 1994 to 1997, Crane ran Laundry Rules Recording, a home studio in Portland, Oregon, where he recorded artists that include Versus, Stephen Malkmus, and Cat Power. Since 1997, Crane has owned and run Jackpot! Recording Studio, Inc., a busy mid-sized studio in Portland, where he has worked with artists such as Sleater-Kinney, The Joggers, The Decemberists, Jenny Lewis, M. Ward, The Go-Betweens, Elliott Smith, Death Cab for Cutie, The Thermals, Stephen Malkmus, Quasi, The Portland Cello Project, Jason Lytle, The Prids and Richmond Fontaine.

A close friend and collaborator of Smith's, he helped release some of Smith's music posthumously in 2007.

Crane has spoken on and moderated panels about recording for TapeOpCon, South by Southwest, North by Northwest, the National Academy of Recording Arts and Sciences, Potluck Audio Conference, Indie Music Forum and College Music Journal. He has worked in the past as a record label owner, radio station music director, disc jockey, record distributor employee, freelance music journalist and band manager. Starting in 1984, he has been a bass player in several bands, including Elephant Factory, Vomit Launch, Sunbirds, Foggy Notion, and Flaming Box of Ants.
