= Russian hussars =

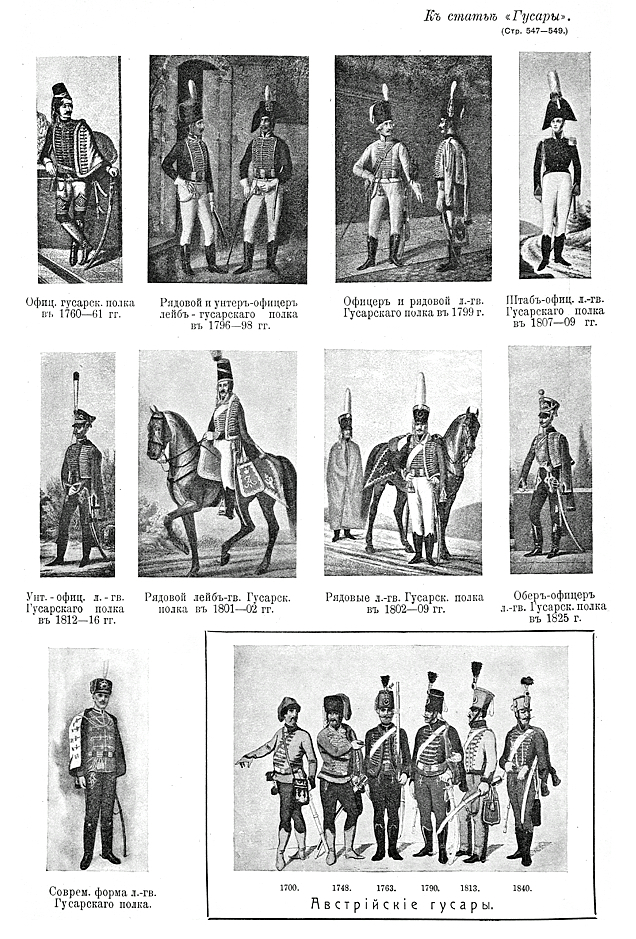
- Drawings from the article "Hussars". Military Encyclopedia of Sytin
- Active: 1723–1917
- Allegiance: Russian Empire
- Type: Light cavalry
- Role: Reconnaissance, skirmish
- Colors: varied by regiment
- Equipment: Sword, a pair of pistols

Hussars were first recorded in Russia as groups of irregulars in the mid-17th century. Under Peter I, this class of light cavalry began to serve as organized regiments on a semi-permanent basis in 1723 based on Serbian Hussars out of the Habsburg monarchy. Hussar regiments remained a conscious element of the Imperial Russian Army until the Revolution of 1917 when they were finally disbanded.

The hussar regiment was a formation (military unit, regiment) of the light cavalry of the Army of the Russian Kingdom and the Russian Imperial Army of the Armed Forces of the Kingdom and the Empire.

The regiments of this type of weapon were intended for reconnaissance, raiding, sentry and liaison services. In the campaign, the subunits of the hussar regiment invariably were part of the vanguard and rearguard, hiding the movement of the main troops of the active formation, conducting reconnaissance of the enemy's actions. And in combat, fighting or battle, they were entrusted with pursuing the retreating (fleeing) enemy, and if their troops failed, to cover the withdrawal of the main troops. Hussar regiments were indispensable for actions on enemy lines of communication in the "parties".

== History ==
=== 17th century ===
In Russia, the hussar formations (companies) as the troops of the "New (Foreign) System" are mentioned in 1634. By 1654, these companies were deployed into a regiment under the command of Colonel Christopher Rylsky. In the spring of 1654, Rylsky's hussar regiment solemnly leaves Moscow, but a year later it disappears from the documents. Probably, it did not justify itself and was transferred to the Reitar Order.

Our great sovereign, against his enemies of the state, gathers a host of many and uncountable, and the orders are different:
Many thousands of spear companies are organized in hussars;
The other many thousands of spear companies are organized in hussars, cavalry, with a fire fight, and in Reitar formation;
...
Then our great sovereign has a military structure.

— Description of the Russian Army, given to Cosimo Medici, in Florence, by the steward Ivan Chemodanov (ambassador in Venice), in 1656

In September 1660, the hussar companies were organized in the Novgorod Grade by Prince Ivan Khovansky. These companies showed themselves splendidly in the battles of the Russian–Polish War and in August 1661 they were deployed into a regiment, which received "hussar shafts" (spears) and armour from the Armoury. Gordon's diary speaks of three companies of hussars who participated in the Kozhukhov Campaign in 1694. The last mention of the hussars of this organization falls in 1701, when the hussars were recruited into the Novgorod Dragoon Regiment. There was also the Consolidated Lance–Reitar–Hussar Regiment of the steward and Colonel Yakov Chelishchev. In 1701, this consolidated formation operated in the area of the Pechersky Monastery "to save the district peasants of the Pskov Uyezd", later it was reorganized into a garrison dragoon regiment, and in the period from 1713 to 1715 was in Smolensk.

Russian hussars, led in 1654 by Colonel Christopher Rylsky, wore wings. The Armoury has preserved Russian hussar armour of the 17th century. Russian hussars could also be supplied with Reitar Armour. So, for example, Prince Khovansky did in 1661, when he did not have time to receive the hussar plate armour. As the prince wrote: "I have accepted 360 plates in the regiment. Of this number, 91 plates were given to the hussar, while by your (royal) decree, hussar armor will be sent to me, and the remaining 269 plates were given to the regiment of Colonel Davyd Zybin to the reitars... And hussar armor and shishaks did not come to my regiment in July until the 7th, and a hussar cannot be without armor and shishaks and without handcuffs". Three units of hussars are recorded as having participated in the 1694 Kozhuhovskaya campaign. The last mention of these irregulars is recorded in 1701, when they were transferred to newly raised Novgorod Dragoon Regiment of regular cavalry.

=== 18th century ===
In April 1707, Peter I instructed the Serbian colonel Apostol Kichich (or Kigetsch) to form a khorugv ("banner" or "squadron") of 300 men to serve on the Ottoman-Russian border, made up of Wallachian, Serbian and other South Slavic immigrants living in Southern Russia (Novorossiya). The squadron consisted of Christians from Hungary, Serbia, Moldova and Wallachia. As a result, the four so–called "Volosh Khorongv" or Hussar Volosh Regiments were formed under colonels Kichich, Vasily Tansky, Mikhail Brashevyan and Serbin. These participated in the Great Northern War. By the time of the Prut Campaign in 1711, the number of Serbian, Wallachian and Polish hussars' regiments had increased to six. In 1711, prior to the Pruth campaign, 6 regiments (4 khorugv's each) of hussars were subsequently formed, mainly from Wallachia. Two other 'khorugv', for guerilla warfare, were formed, one Polish and one Serbian, to serve against the Ottomans. After the campaign, these regiments were reorganized into two hussar regiments. Later, 1,500 Wallachian hussars were left in Russian service, of which three regiments were formed under colonels Kichich, Tansky and Serbin. The Hussar regiments were disbanded in 1721 after the conclusion of the Treaty of Nystad due to high maintenance cost as mercenary units and their indiscipline. With the completion of a regular army by Peter the Great, as well as the permanent establishment of regiments, the existing hussars and other irregulars (other than the Cossacks) were disbanded. However, Emperor Peter I ordered (ukase) in October 1723 the Serbian major Ivan Albanez to form a Serbian Hussar Regiment of 316 people (of which 285 privates), recruited exclusively from Serbian light cavalry formerly serving in the Austrian army. It was not possible to recruit a regiment according to the state, and in 1726 the personnel were distributed among the suburban regiments, but the next year they were reassembled, allocating land for settlement on the outskirts of Russia (Ukraine) and ordering to increase the staff to 1,000 people, taking the missing six hundred from suburban regiments. On 3 September 1728, the staff was reduced to 600 people, the number of Serbs had to be replenished at the expense of young Circassians. In 1729, the regiment was settled on the territory between the fortress Tor and the Ukrainian line. By 1733 the regiment had 197 personnel (130 privates), in connection with which the regiment commander Ivan Stoyanov took active measures to recruit Serbs – in particular, in the Austrian region of the Holy Roman Empire.

In 1736, in connection with the outbreak of the Russian–Turkish War, the staff of the regiment was brought to 1,160 people in 10 companies. In 1737, in addition to the Little Russian and Zaporozhye (Cherkasy) Cossacks, it was allowed to accept Hungarians, Wallachians, Transylvanians and Moldavians into the regiment. By 1740, the regiment numbered 1,045. The Serbian Hussar Regiment took part in the storming of Ochakov, battles at the Prut River and Khotin. On 14 October 1741, by decree of Anna Leopoldovna, the composition of the four existing hussar regiments (Serbian, Hungarian, Moldavian and Georgian) was brought to a uniformity: 963 (or 1,063) people in 10 companies.

During the regency of Grand Duchess Anna Leopoldovna, on 14 October 1741, four Hussar regiments, a Serbian (Serbskiy), a Moldavian (Moldavskiy), a Hungarian (Vengerskiy) and a Georgian (Gruzinskiy) were authorized. After the Russo-Turkish War (1735–1739), these hussar regiments were converted to regular service. The rank and file were enlisted volunteers and not conscripts, as were the majority of the Russian army. The new hussar regiments had a status between regular and irregular cavalry. Hussars were recruited only from the nation indicated by the regiment's name, i.e., these regiments were national units in Russian service; all troops (including officers) were national, and commands were given in the respective languages. Each regiment was supposed to have a fixed organization of 10 companies, each of about 100 men, but these regiments were recruited from different sources, so they were often less than the indicated strength. Later, in 1759–60, three more Hussar regiments, were raised: the Yellow (Zeltiy), the Macedonian (Makedonskiy) and the Bulgarian (Bolgarskiy).

In 1754, two Serbians Rajko Preradović and Jovan Šević entered the Russian service. Accompanied by a significant number of Serbian families they received grants of land between Bakhmutov and Lugansk. In return they were tasked with forming two hussar regiments of 1000 men each. In 1764, two Pandur regiments, together with the Novomirgorod garrison and Serbian hussars, were reorganized into three settled cavalry regiments: the Black and Yellow Hussars and the Elisavetgrad Pikiner Regiments. Under Catherine II Rajko Preradović's and Jovan Šević's existing hussar units were merged into one – the Bahmutskiy Hussars- in 1764. Two years later, additional hussar units were formed with Cossack, Bulgarian and Macedonian recruits these were disbanded.

On 24 December 1776, it was indicated that nine hussar regiments were formed on the territory of the Azov and Novorossiya Governorates to protect the southern borders of the empire, from the frame of the abolished cavalry units:

- Slavic;
- Illyric;
- Serbian;
- Bulgarian;
- Dalmatian;
- Wallachian;
- Moldavian;
- Macedonian;
- Hungarian.

In 1783 the highest decision was made and the army hussar regiments were renamed into light horse regiments and became part of the Yekaterinoslav Cavalry. During the period of the All–Russian Emperor Paul the First, four regiments were disbanded, and their personnel went to replenish the field regiments, six were renamed as hussars, and one as cuirassier. The Serbian Hussar Regiment in 1783 entered the formation of the Olviopol Hussar Regiment.

=== 19th century ===
After 1787 hussar regiments were again raised and by the war with France of 1812 twelve were in existence. By 1833 these had increased in number to fourteen line regiments plus two of the Guard (Grodno Hussars and Elizavetgrad Hussars). After the reorganization of the cavalry dated 17 December 1812 all of the hussar regiments were reorganized into three divisions:

1st Hussar Division

- Grodno Hussars
- Elizavetgrad Hussars
- Izyum Hussars
- Sumy Hussars

2nd Hussar Division

- Alexandria Hussars
- Akhtyrka Hussars
- Irkutsk hussar regiment
- Mariupol Hussars

3rd Hussar Division

- Belarusian Hussars
- Lubny Hussars
- Olviopol Hussars
- Pavlograd Hussars

During the First Patriotic War of 1812, the hussar formations served as the basis for the creation of a number of partisan detachments (detachments of light cavalry), which delivered surprise attacks on the communications of European troops. For the courage and heroism of the personnel of the hussar formations shown in battles against the troops of Europe united by Napoleon, four regiments of hussars were awarded the George Standards, 9 regiments – George and Silver Pipes, 10 regiments – the badges "For Distinction" on the shako, and the Grodno Hussar Regiment for distinctions in battle in the area of Klyastitsa was renamed to Klyastitsky General Yakov Kulnev Regiment.

Instrument cloth of the uniform and equipment of the hussar regiments for 1812
Regiment	Dolman	Collar	Cuffs	Mentic	Chakchirs	Tashka	Tashka Lining	Cheprak	Saddle Cover	Instrument Metal
Life Hussar										
Akhtyrsky (12)										
Izyumsky (11)										
Sumy (1)										
Elizavetgradsky (3)										
Mariupolsky (4)										
Belarusian (7)										
Alexandrian (5)										
Pavlogradsky (2)										
Lubensky (8)										
Grodno										
Olviopolsky										
Irkutsk (16)										

Later, the hussar regiments took part in the abroad campaigns of the Russian Army in 1813–1814, in the Russian–Turkish War of 1877–1878. In 1883, the Supreme decision was again made to rename the regiments, this time to dragoon regiments. All regular Russian hussar and uhlan regiments (except the Imperial Guard) were converted to dragoons. All fourteen hussar regiments lost their traditional and distinctive uniforms as well as titles. The decision to abolish the traditions of the triumphant Russian army was very unpopular and widely opposed by military personnel. Many officers defiantly resigned, while others continued to wear makeshift versions of their former uniforms well into the mid-1880s. The new uniforms were designed in a simplified style, imitating the national semi-historical Russian costume, and were considered too simple and rustic. The reform left only two hussar regiments within the Imperial Guard (His Majesty's Hussar Life-Guards regiment and Grodno Life-Guards Hussar regiment) with their uniforms relatively unchanged.

During the military reform of Nicholas II in 1907, some regiments were given back the name of the hussars. Before the Imperialist War, there were 20 hussar regiments in the Armed Forces of the Russian Empire. Later, the following hussar formations remained in the Russian Imperial Army:

- Grodno Hussar Regiment;
- Elisavetgrad Hussar Regiment;
- Izyum Hussar Regiment;
- Sumy Hussar Regiment;
- Alexandrian Hussar Regiment;
- Akhtyrsky Hussar Regiment;
- Irkutsk Hussar Regiment;
- Mariupol Hussar Regiment;
- Belarusian Hussar Regiment;
- Lubensky Hussar Regiment;
- Olviopol Hussar Regiment;
- Pavlograd Hussar Regiment;
- Chernigov Hussar Regiment.

=== Disestablishment ===
In 1907, after the defeat in Russo-Japanese War (which to a degree was caused by the unpopular 1882 reform), the government of Nicholas II decided to restore the prestige of the Russian army. The previously re-converted hussar and uhlan regiments were restored in their historical titles. The new parade uniforms were generally based on those of pre-1882, though differed significantly in details. There were two Russian imperial guard Hussar regiments, that of "His Majesty" and "Grodno".

In November 1917, the 20 existing hussar regiments, along the remainder of the former Imperial Army, were disbanded. A former officer of the 1st Sumsky Hussar regiment recorded that his regiment survived until February 1918 when, however, the remaining officers and the Soldiers' Committee decided "…to mount and ride away in different directions to their respective homes".

== Equipment ==
Late classical Russian hussar uniforms and equipment borrowed many elements of the Hungarian hussar form, and included:

- Dolman – short (up to the waist), single-breasted jacket with high collar and cords, which throws Mentik
- Kiver – with the sultan (a kind of hackle), cords (etishkets) and repeyok (a snap-on cockade). Since 1803 Prior to that – Cap.
- Sash Gombe (interceptions)
- Pelisse – short jacket (with cords), fine fur, worn over the dolman
- Belt
- Breeches (Chakchiry)
- Sword
- Boots (boots) – Low
- Sarsala – piece for hussar horses
- Tashka – Bag
- Etishket – cord with tassels on shako
- A pair of pistols

All were richly adorned with gold or silver braid, cords, fringe and lace.

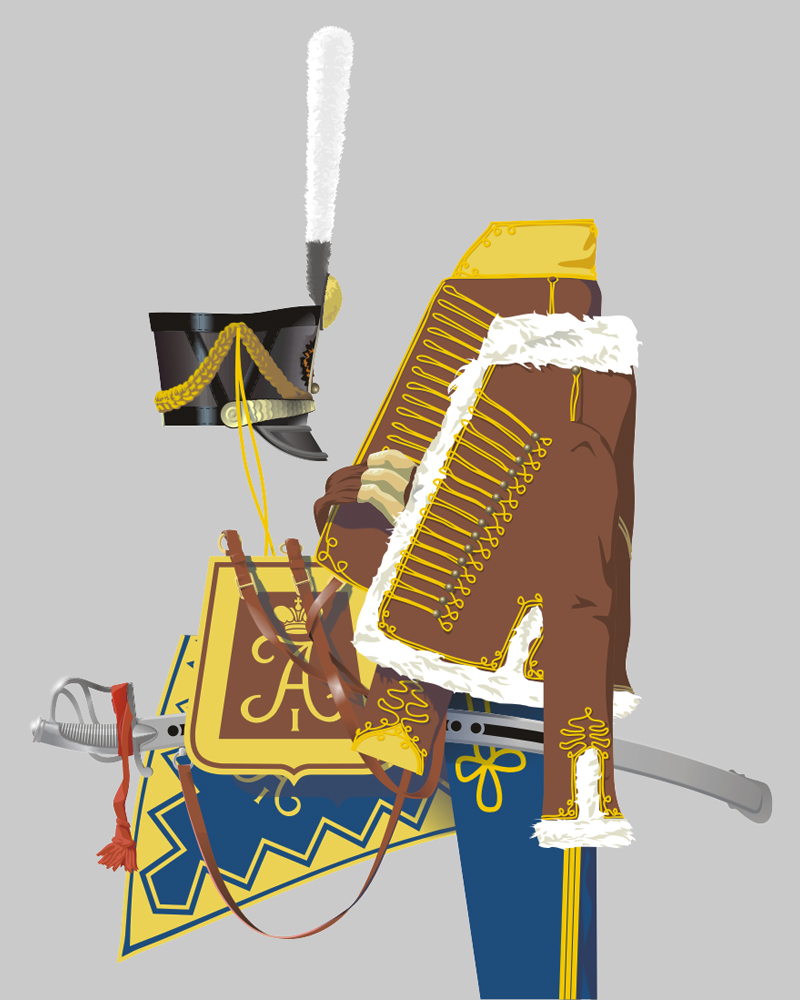
Akhtyrsky Regiment

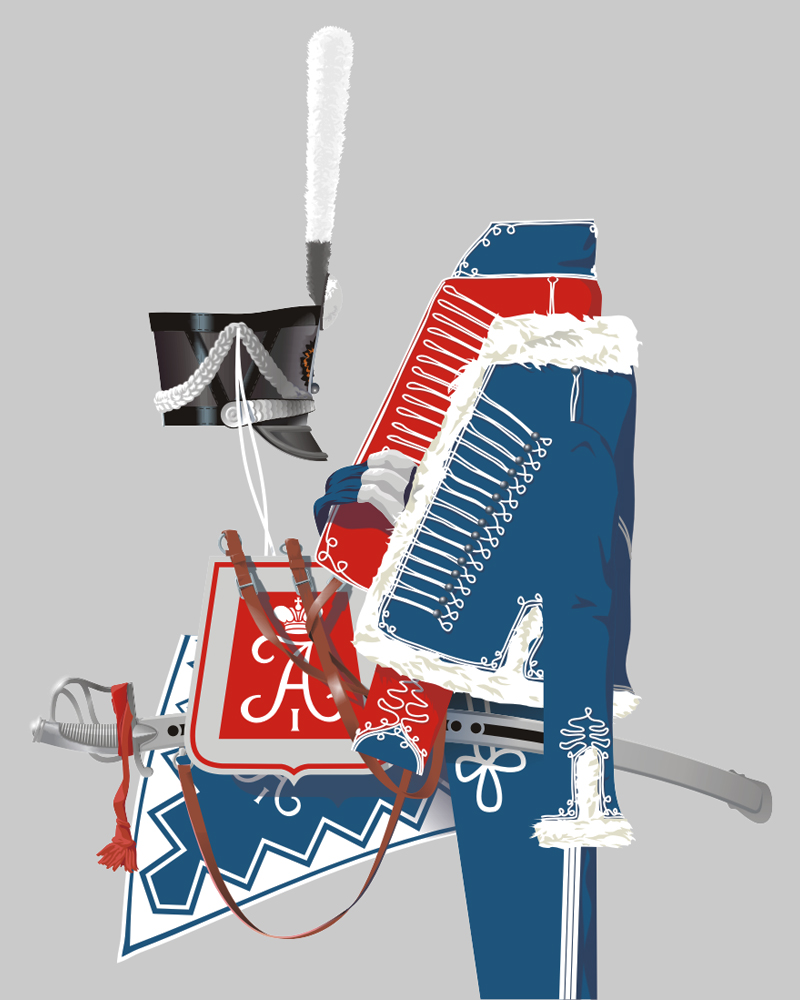
Izium Regiment

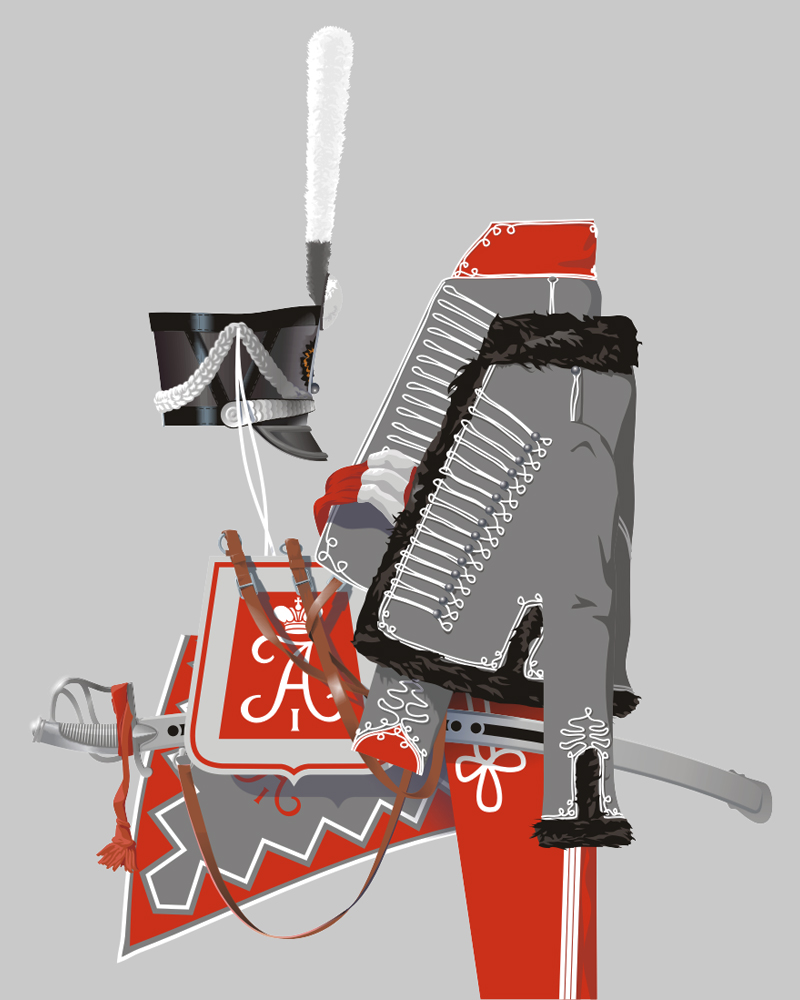
Sumy Regiment

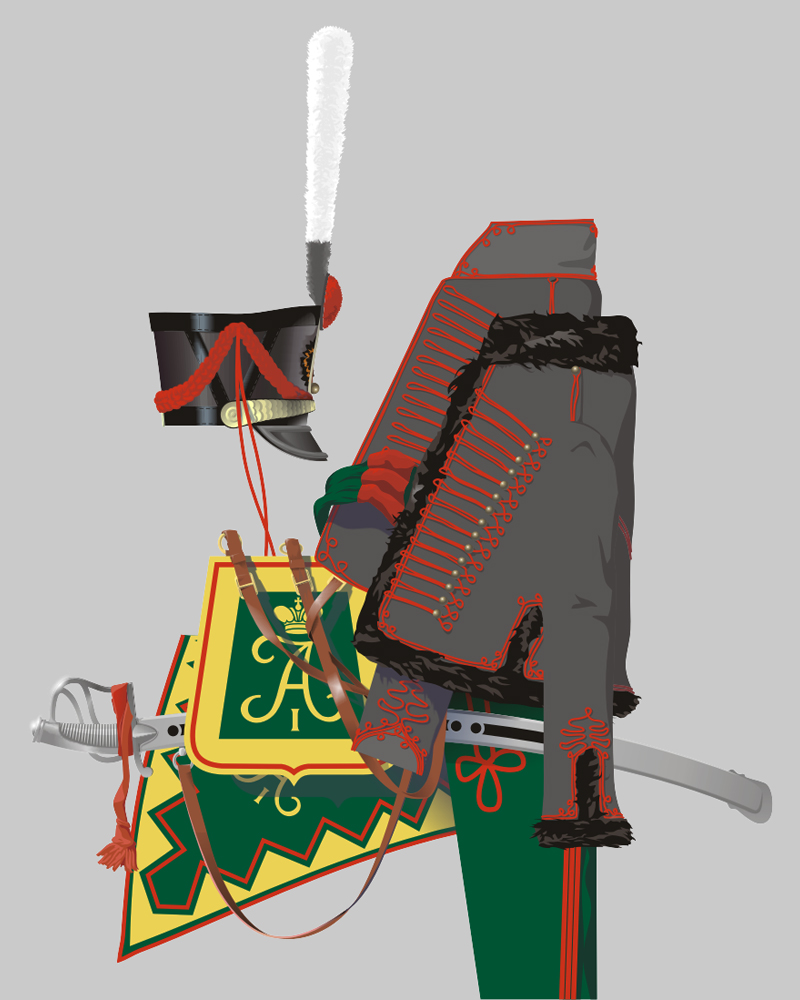
Elisavetgrad Regiment

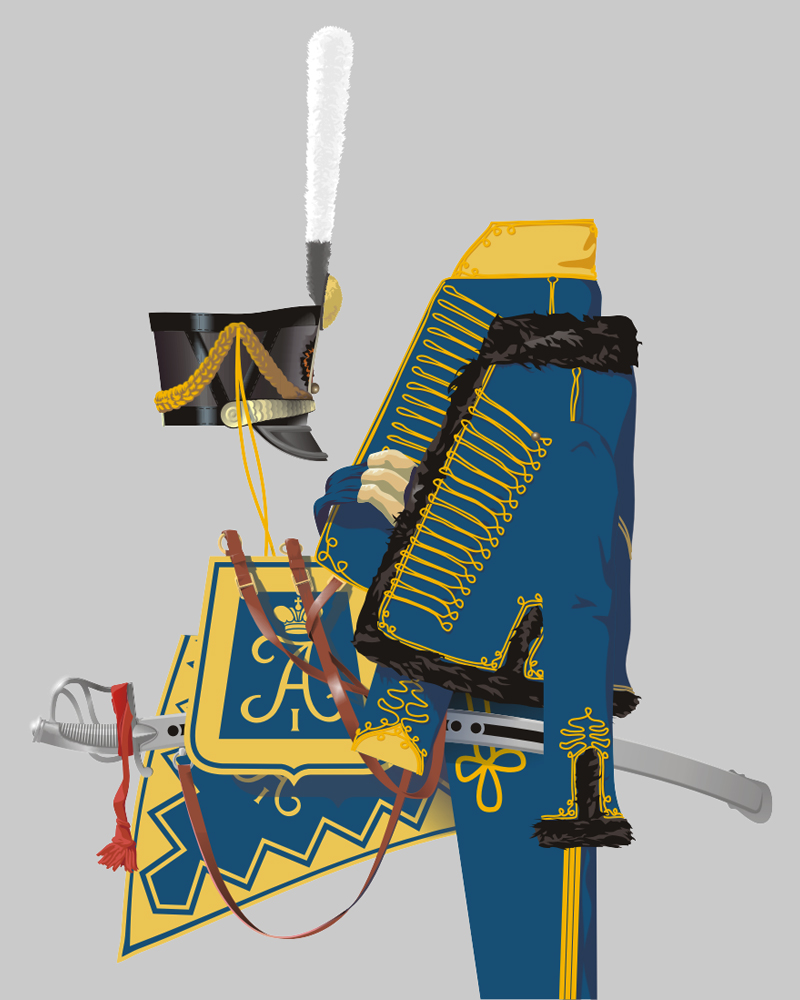
Mariupol Regiment

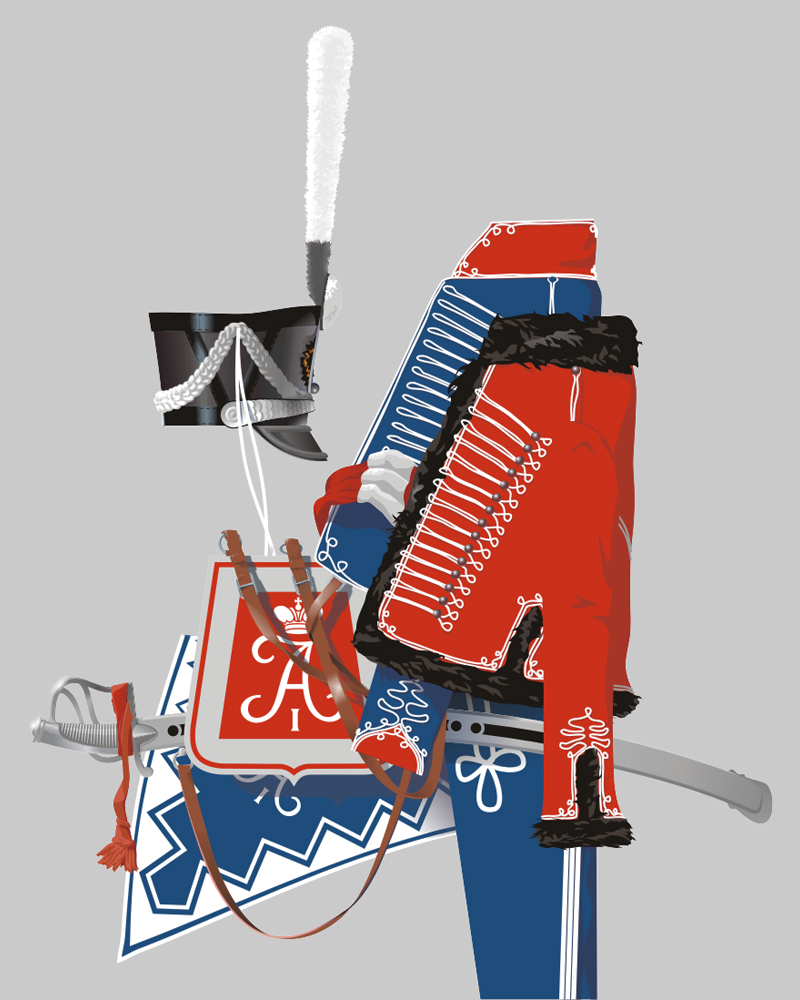
Belarusian Regiment

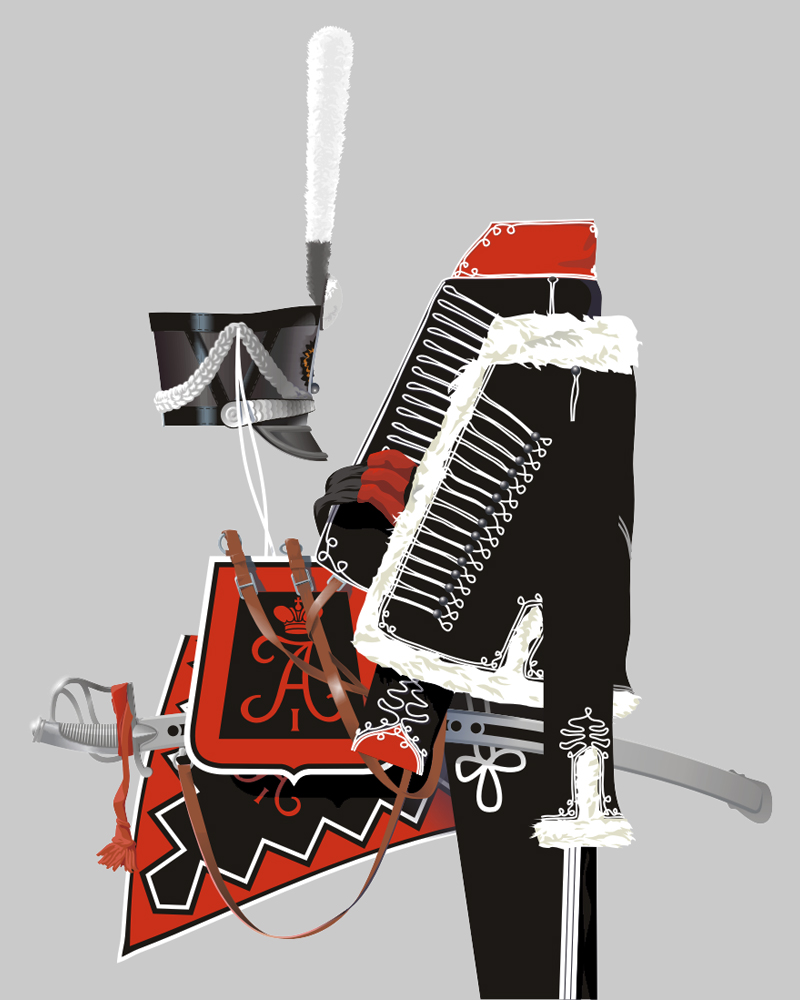
Alexandrian Regiment

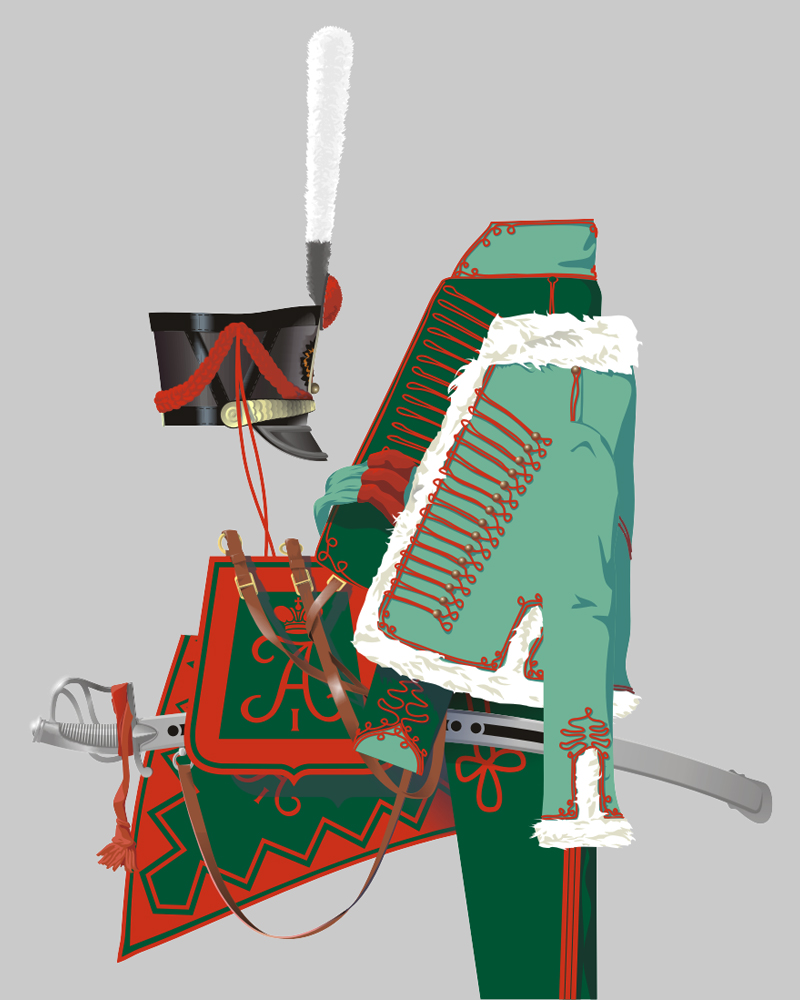
Pavlograd Regiment

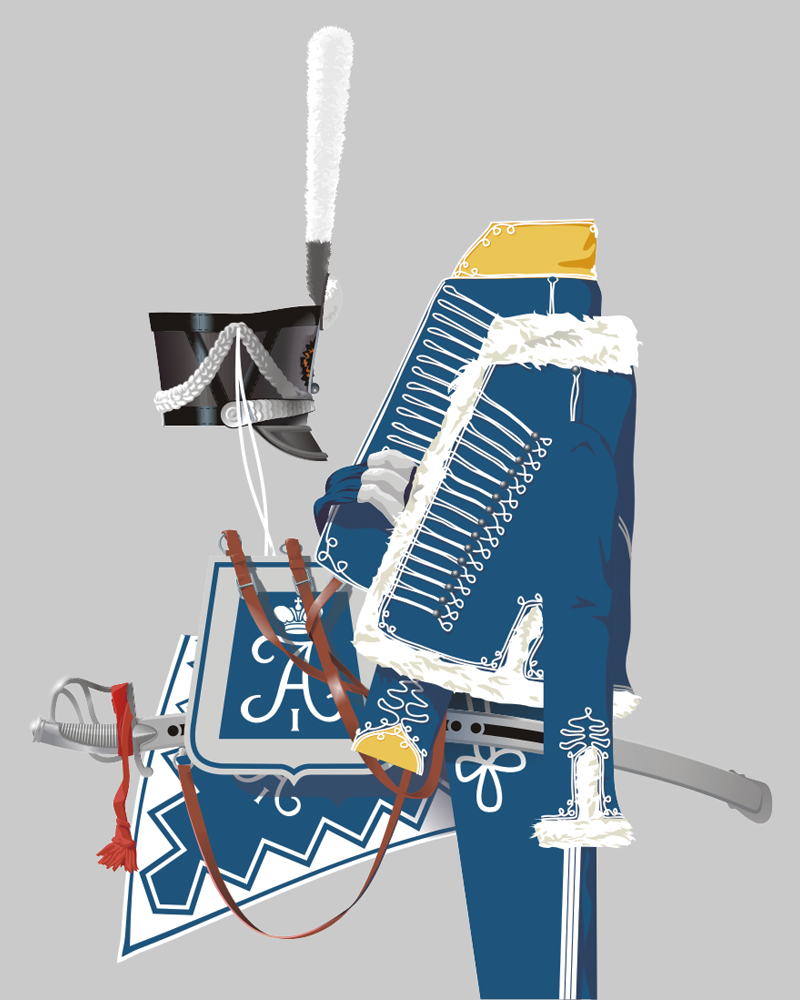
Lubensky Regiment

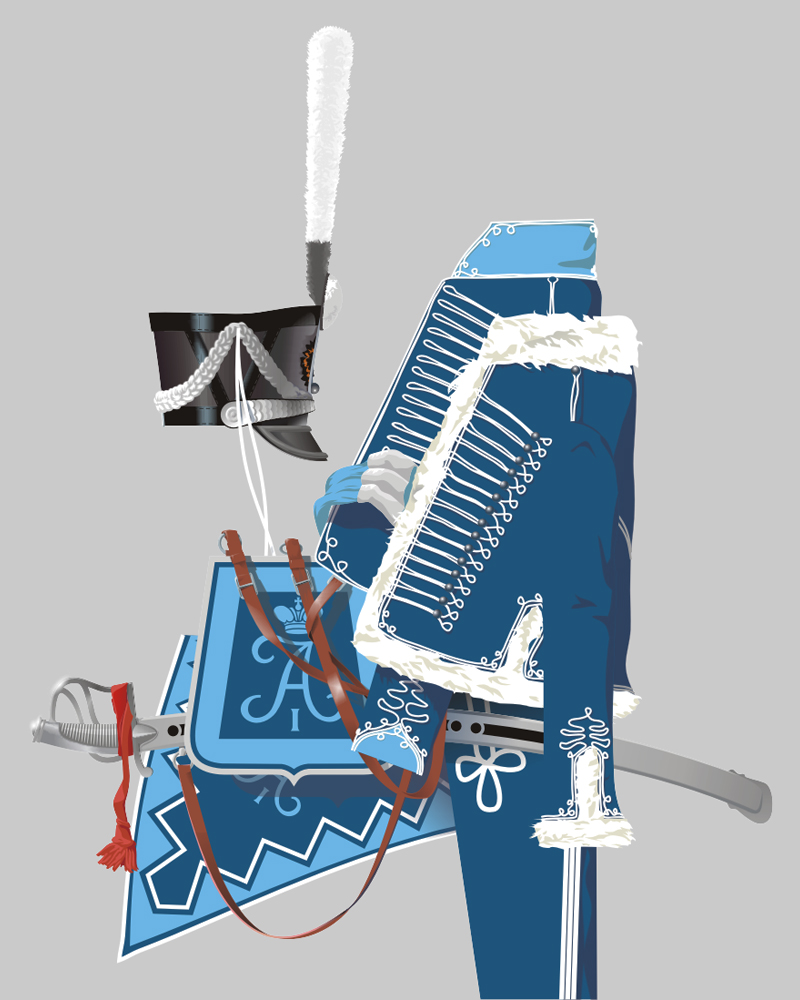
Grodno Regiment

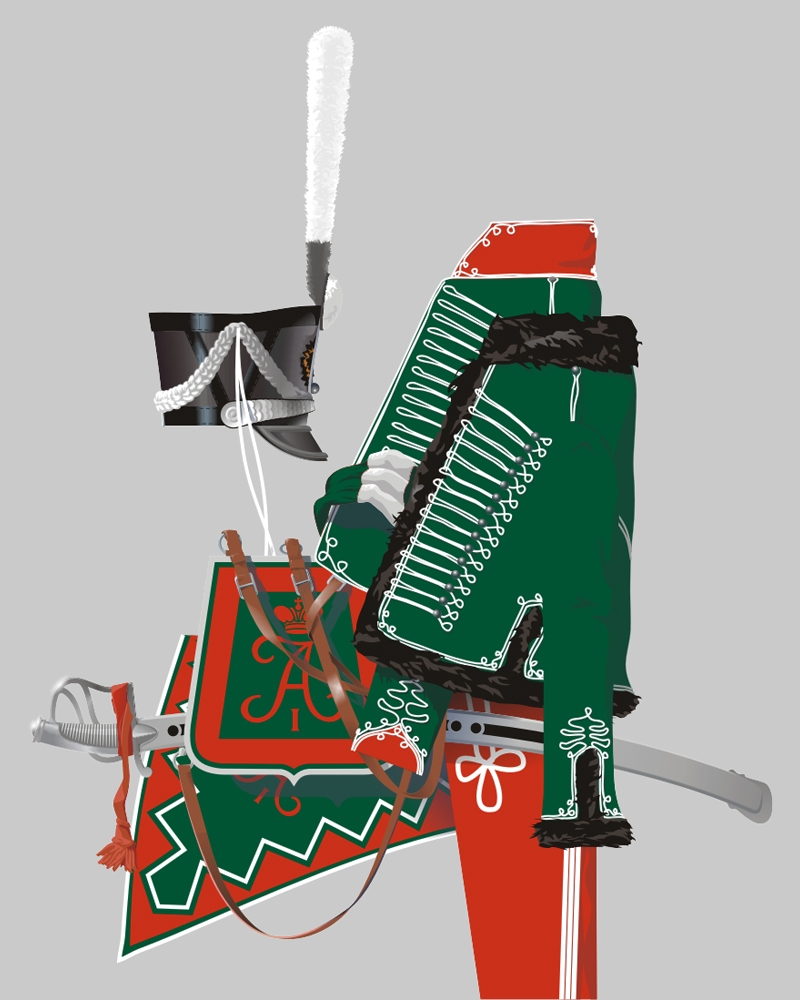
Olviopol Regiment

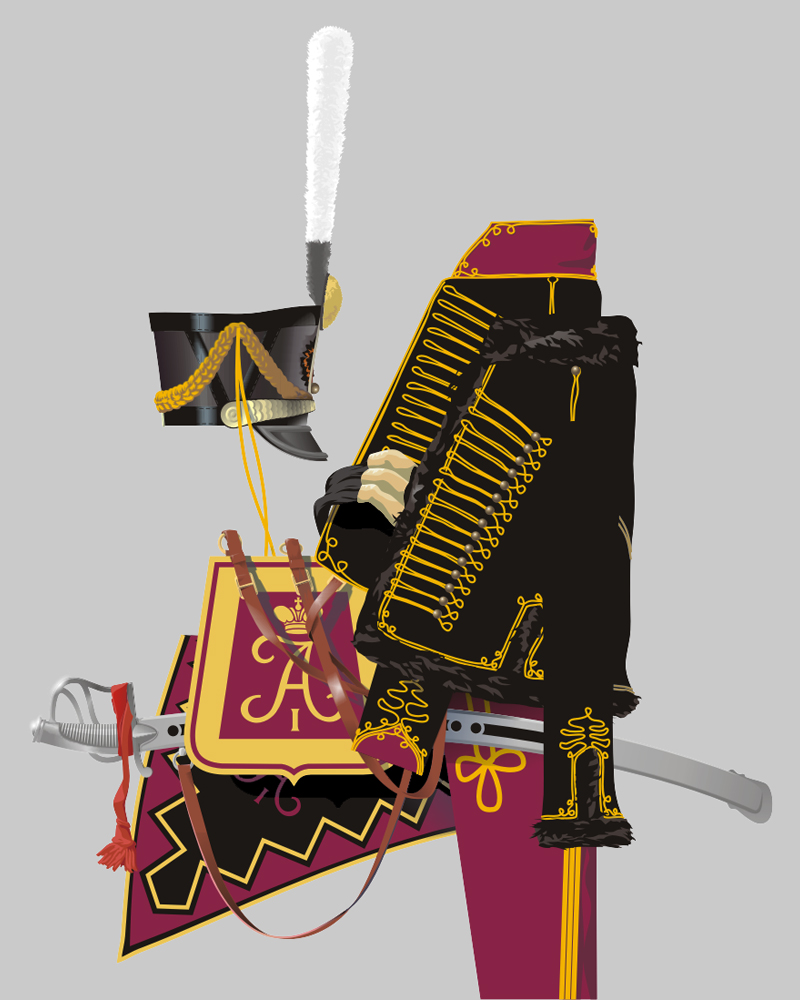
Irkutsk Regiment

== Gallery ==
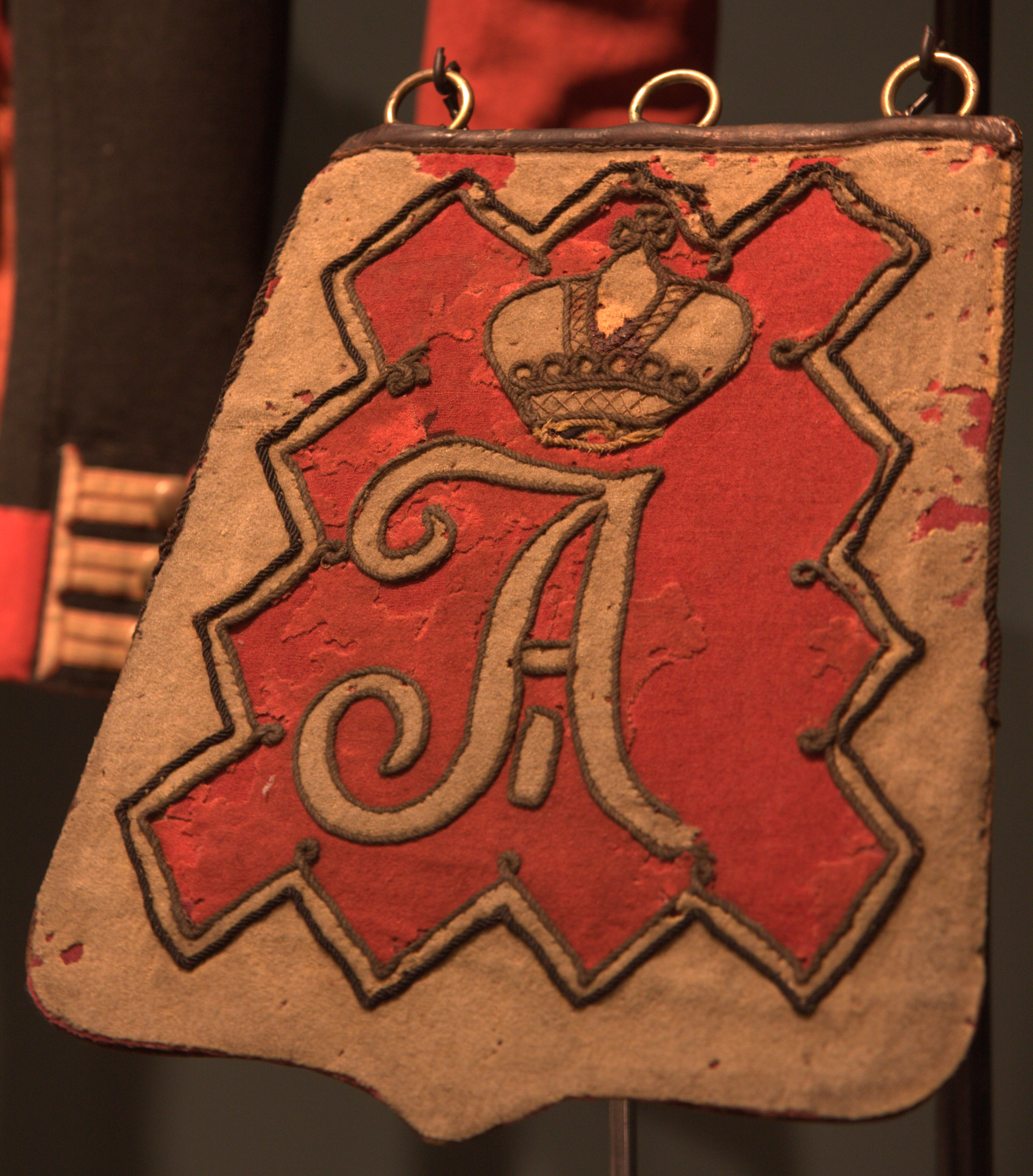
Tashka in the Life Guards Hussar Regiment, sample from 1802 to 1825

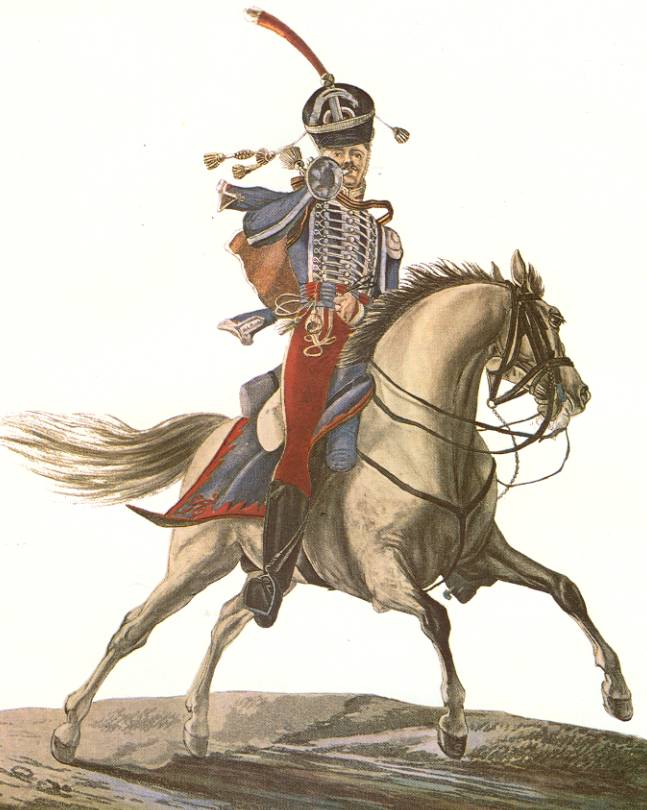
The uniform of a serviceman of the 1st Sumy Hussar Regiment, 1812, drawing by Lev Kil

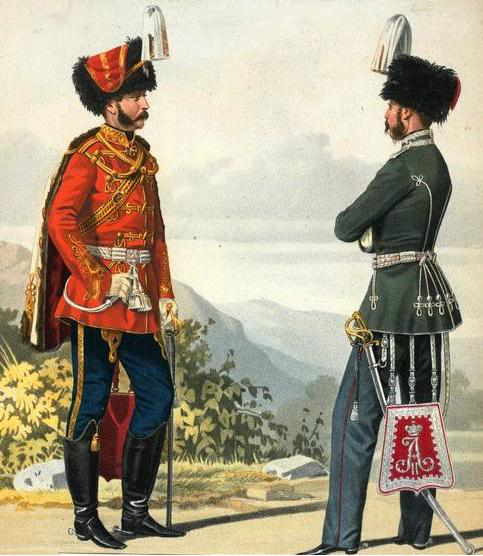
Karl Piratsky. The Headquarters Officer of the Hussar Life Guards and the Chief Officer of the Life Guards of the Grodno Hussars. 1858

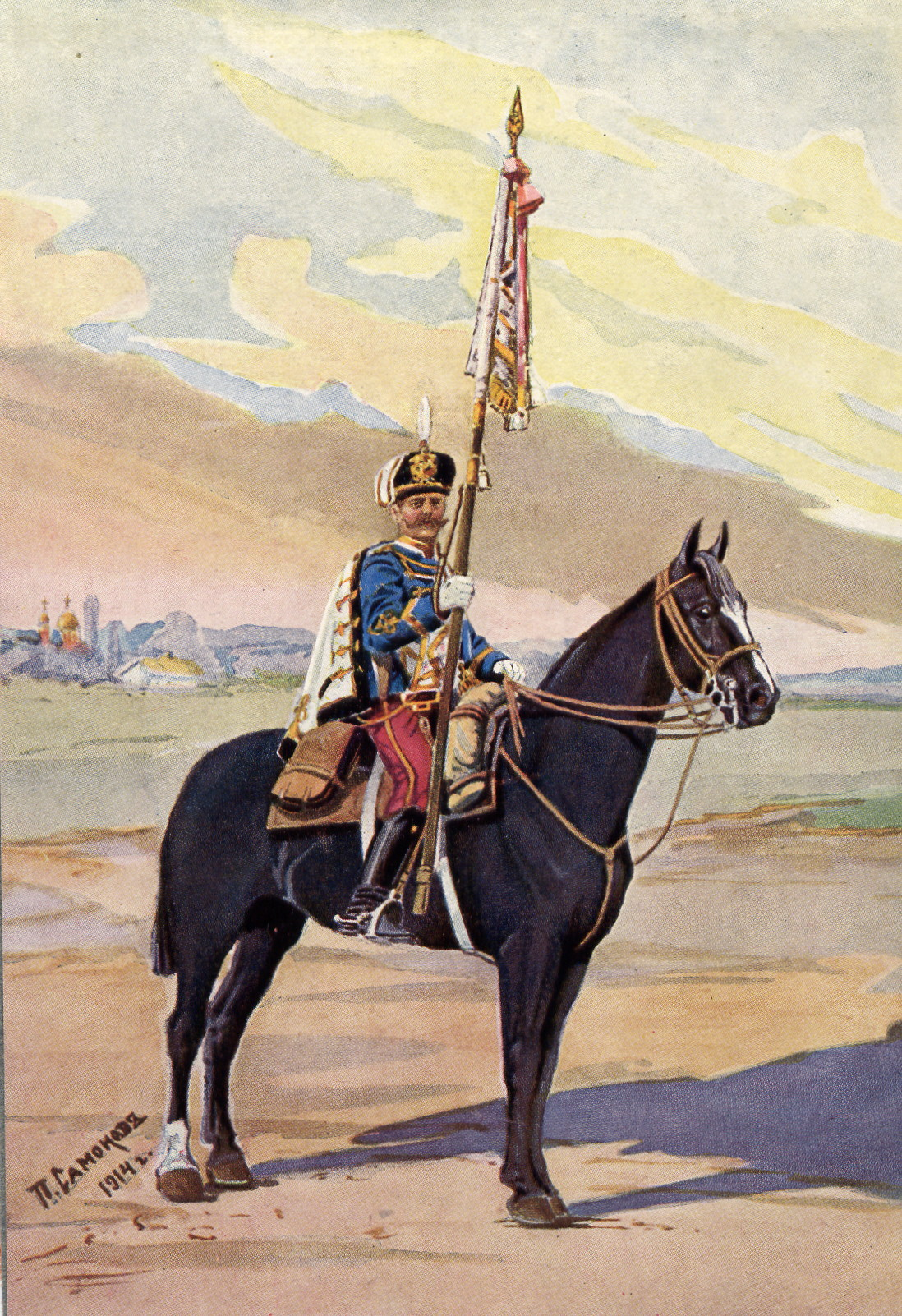
The Sergeant–Major of the Elisavetgrad Hussar Regiment with the Regimental Standard. Drawing by Lieutenant Colonel Samonov

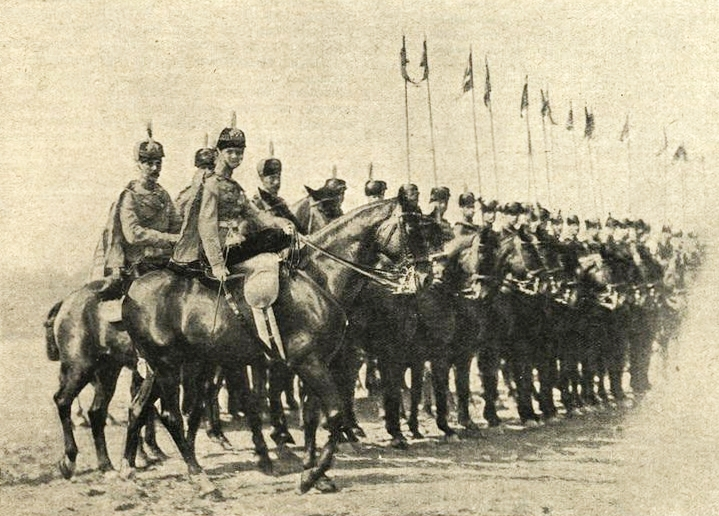
1913. Parade to the 3rd Elisavetgrad Hussar Regiment in Peterhof

== Sources ==
- John Shelton Curtis (1965). The Russian Army under Nicholas I, 1825–1855. Duke University Press. ISBN 978-0-598-21316-7.
- Hussars // Brockhaus and Efron Encyclopedic Dictionary: in 86 Volumes (82 Volumes and 4 Additional) – Saint Petersburg, 1890–1907
- Foreign Troops in Russian Service // Military Encyclopedia: in 18 Volumes / Edited by Vasily Novitsky ... and Others – Saint Petersburg; Moscow: Printing House of the Ivan Sytin Partnership, 1911–1915
- Novorossiysk Territory // Brockhaus and Efron Encyclopedic Dictionary: in 86 Volumes (82 Volumes and 4 Additional) – Saint Petersburg, 1890–1907
- Ekaterinoslav Cavalry // Military Encyclopedia: in 18 Volumes / Edited by Vasily Novitsky ... and Others – Saint Petersburg; Moscow: Printing House of the Ivan Sytin Partnership, 1911–1915
- Ariadna Bazhova. Russian–Yugoslav Relations in the Second Half of the 18th Century – Moscow, 1982
- Nikolay Markevich. Osip Khrustalev. History of Little Russia – Moscow: 1842–1843. Volume 1–5
- Alexander Viskovatov. Historical Description of the Clothing and Weapons of the Russian Troops from Ancient Times to 1855. (Volumes 1–30 – Saint Petersburg, 1841–1862; Second Edition – Volumes 1–34. Saint Petersburg – Novosibirsk – Leningrad, 1899–1948) – was awarded in 1842 the Half Demidov Prize
