= JMC =

JMC may refer to:

== Places ==
- Jamaica, ITU country code

== Education ==
- JMC Academy, entertainment technology academy in Australia
- Jacobs Medical Center, a hospital at the University of California San Diego
- Jamal Mohamed College, a five-star status autonomous college at Tiruchirappalli in India
- James Madison College, a residential public affairs college at Michigan State University
- Jerusalem Music Centre, a music education centre in Jerusalem
- Jesus and Mary College, New Delhi
- John McGlashan College, an integrated composite boys' school in Dunedin, New Zealand
- John Muir College, a residential college at the University of California San Diego
- Jose Maria College, a tertiary educational institution in Davao City, Philippines
- Junior Mathematical Challenge, a challenge for students aged between 11 and 13, organised by the United Kingdom Mathematics Trust

== Government and politics ==
- Jaffna Municipal Council, the local council for Jaffna, Sri Lanka
- Jammu Municipal Corporation, the city of Jammu's governing body
- Joint Ministerial Committee, between ministers of the UK Government, Scottish Executive, Welsh Assembly Government and Northern Ireland Executive

== Military ==
- Joint Maritime Course, a UK military exercise; see Exercise Joint Warrior
- Joint Modernization Command, a command for modernizing the United States Army
- Joint Munitions Command, command that procures ammunition for the United States Armed Forces

== People ==
- Arani Srinivasulu, also known as Jangalapalli Srinivasulu and JMC, Indian politician
- J. M. Coetzee, South African-Australian writer
- Jason McRoy, a professional mountain bike racer from the UK
- Jason Michael Carroll, American country music singer
- John McCain, an American politician
- Jose Mari Chan (born 1945), Filipino singer

== Technology ==
=== Science ===
- Joint Mathematical Council, concerned with teaching and advancement of mathematics in the United Kingdom
- Journal of Materials Chemistry, a British scientific journal
- Journal of Medicinal Chemistry, an American medical journal

=== Transportation ===
- JMC Air, a British charter airline
- Jiangling Motors Corporation, Jiangling Motors, an automobile manufacturer in China.

== Other uses ==
- Jesus Miracle Crusade, a religious denomination in the Philippines
- JDK Mission Control, software for troubleshooting Java applications
- The Jesus and Mary Chain, a Scottish rock band
- Jupiter Mining Corporation, a fictional space mining company from the television programme Red Dwarf

== See also ==
- JCM (disambiguation)
