= Communication (disambiguation) =

Communication is the act of creating and conveying information.

Communication(s) may also refer to:

== Communication topics ==
- Human communication
  - Interpersonal communication, between individual people
- Telecommunications, the transmission of signals over a distance for the purpose of communication

== Music ==
=== Albums ===
- Communication (Bobby Womack album) or the title song, 1971
- Communication (Bugskull album) or the title song, 2009
- Communication (Jazz Composer's Orchestra album), 1965
  - The Jazz Composer's Orchestra (album), sometimes referred to as Communications, 1968
- Communication (Karl Bartos album), 2003
- Communication (Nelson Riddle album), 1971
- Communication!!!, by Leah Dizon, or the title song, 2008
- Communication, an EP by Nicole Millar, 2016

=== Songs ===
- "Communication" (Hitomi Takahashi song), 2006
- "Communication" (John Farnham song), 1989
- "Communication" (The Power Station song), 1985
- "Communication" (Spandau Ballet song), 1983
- "Communication" (Armin van Buuren song), 1999
- "Communication", by Black Eyed Peas from Behind the Front, 1998
- "Communication", by the Cardigans from Long Gone Before Daylight, 2003
- "Communication", by Janet Jackson from Dream Street, 1984
- "Communication", by Mario Più, 1999
- "Communication", by Pete Townshend from All the Best Cowboys Have Chinese Eyes, 1982

== Journals ==
- Communications, a French transdisciplinary journal published by the Edgar Morin Centre in Paris
- Communications, an academic journal published by the Science Publishing Group in Pakistan
- Communications, several journals in various disciplines published by Nature
- Communications of the ACM, monthly journal of the Association for Computing Machinery
- Journal of Communications, an international scientific journal focused on communications

== Other uses ==
- "Communication" (The Armando Iannucci Shows), a television episode

== See also ==
- Communicate (disambiguation)
- Communication art (disambiguation)
- Communiqué, a brief report or statement
