= Communicate (disambiguation) =

Communicate is the verb form of communication.

Communicate may also refer to:

- Communicate (Sasha & John Digweed album), 2000
- Communicate (The Feelers album), 2001
- Communicate (TV series), Canadian game show television series
- Communicate (magazine), monthly trade magazine for the UK corporate communications community
- Communicate!, 2004 album by The Solution
- "Communicate", a song by Moka Only from the album Carrots and Eggs, 2008

== See also ==
- Willingness to communicate, language students willing to communicate in the second language
- Communication (disambiguation)
