= Bugskull & The Big White Cloud =

Studio album by Bugskull
- Released: 2000
- Genre: Experimental rock, lo-fi
- Length: 35:44
- Label: Scratch

Bugskull chronology
| Distracted Snowflake Volume Two (1999) | Bugskull & The Big White Cloud (2000) | Time Is Not Our Fried (2009) |

Bugskull & The Big White Cloud is the sixth studio album by Bugskull, released in 2000 by Scratch Records.

== Track listing ==
All tracks are written by Sean Byrne.

| No. | Title | Length |
|---|---|---|
| 1. | "Fair Are the Sails" | 3:55 |
| 2. | "We Understand That" | 10:48 |
| 3. | "Very Hungry and Very Thirsty at the Same Time" | 2:00 |
| 4. | "–" | 3:16 |
| 5. | "Taj Mahal" | 2:50 |
| 6. | "Tweedlebug Jamboree" | 12:55 |

== Personnel ==
Adapted from the Bugskull & The Big White Cloud liner notes.

- Sean Byrne – lead vocals, instruments
- James Yu – instruments

== Release history ==
| Region | Date | Label | Format | Catalog |
|---|---|---|---|---|
| United States | 2000 | Scratch | CD, LP | SCRATCH No. 36 |
