= Crock: Original Motion Picture Soundtrack =

Studio album by Bügsküll
- Released: 1995
- Genre: Experimental rock lo-fi
- Length: 46:14
- Label: Pop Secret

Bugskull chronology
Phantasies and Senseitions (1994)	Crock: Original Motion Picture Soundtrack (1995)	Snakland (1995)

Crock: Original Motion Picture Soundtrack is the second studio album by Bügsküll, released in 1995 by Pop Secret.

== Track listing ==
All tracks are written by Sean Byrne.

No.	Title	Length
1.	"Storm the Fort"	2:07
2.	"Pretty Boy's Tent"	4:52
3.	"The Lost Patrol Relax in the Sun"	3:46
4.	"Maggot Loves Pretty Boy"	3:53
5.	"The Lost Patrol's Psychedelic Exp."	9:47
6.	"The Cactus Corps"	16:11
7.	"The Lost Patrol Return Home"	5:38
Total length:		46:14

== Personnel ==
Adapted from the Crock liner notes.

Bügsküll

- Brendan Bell
- Sean Byrne
- James Yu

== Release history ==
Region	Date	Label	Format	Catalog
United States	1995	Pop Secret	CD, LP	POP1
