= Collapsed View =

Studio album by Bugskull
- Released: August 26, 2014
- Genre: Experimental rock, lo-fi
- Length: 43:40
- Label: Digitalis

Bugskull chronology
Hidden Mountain (2012)	Collapsed View (2014)

Collapsed View is the ninth studio album by Bugskull, released on August 26, 2014, by Digitalis Recordings.

== Track listing ==
All tracks are written by Sean Byrne.

Side one
No.	Title	Length
1.	"Heaven-California"	4:24
2.	"Olde Growth"	4:06
3.	"Billow"	4:05
4.	"Icarus Rising"	5:00
5.	"Demapped"	5:46

Side two
No.	Title	Length
1.	"Druids"	7:08
2.	"Collapsed View"	5:22
3.	"Victory Lapse"	7:49

== Personnel ==
Adapted from the Collapsed View liner notes.

- Sean Byrne – lead vocals, instruments

== Release history ==
Region	Date	Label	Format	Catalog
United States	2014	Digitalis	LP	digiv068
