= Hidden Mountain =

Studio album by Bugskull
- Released: January 18, 2012
- Genre: Experimental rock, lo-fi
- Length: 37:52
- Label: Almost Halloween Time

Bugskull chronology
Communication (2009)	Hidden Mountain (2012)	Collapsed View (2014)

Hidden Mountain is the eighth studio album by Bugskull, released on January 18, 2012, by Almost Halloween Time.

== Track listing ==
All tracks are written by Sean Byrne.

Side one
No.	Title	Length
1.	"Old Town"	2:52
2.	"Hidden Mountain"	7:42
3.	"The Lights"	5:27
4.	"Wolves"	4:00

Side two
No.	Title	Length
1.	"Early Winter, Hoping for an Early Spring"	6:19
2.	"Lost Cause"	4:11
3.	"To Be the Head and Not the Tail"	7:20

== Personnel ==
Adapted from the Hidden Mountain liner notes.

- Sean Byrne – lead vocals, acoustic guitar
- Aaron Day – electric guitar, synthesizer, trumpet

== Release history ==
Region	Date	Label	Format	Catalog
Canada	2012	Scratch	CD	SCRATCH No. 65
Italy	2012	Almost Halloween Time	LP	AHT016
United States	2012	Shrimper	CS	SHR 162
