= Snakland =

Studio album by Bugskull
- Released: 1995
- Genre: Experimental rock, lo-fi
- Length: 46:27
- Label: Scratch
- Producer: Brendan Bell, Sean Byrne

Bugskull chronology
Crock: Original Motion Picture Soundtrack (1995)	Snakland (1995)	Distracted Snowflake Volume One (1997)

Professional ratings
Review scores
Source	Rating
Allmusic	4/5 stars

Snakland is the third studio album by Bugskull, released in 1995 by Scratch Records.

== Track listing ==
All tracks are written by Sean Byrne.

No.	Title	Length
1.	"Bring the Clowns"	2:26
2.	"Snakland"	6:58
3.	"Long Corridor, No. 8"	1:20
4.	"Mind Phaser"	6:25
5.	"Egg Chamber"	5:43
6.	"From the Skies"	4:45
7.	"Walkin' Stone'"	2:05
8.	"Buncer"	5:41
9.	"Exit Wound"	11:04

== Personnel ==
Adapted from the Snakland liner notes.

Bügsküll

- Brendan Bell – bass guitar, production, engineering
- Sean Byrne – lead vocals, guitar, production, engineering
- James Yu – drums, design

Production and additional personnel

- Cora Crory – photography, design
- Mark Hansen – accordion (5)
- Chris Willging – photography

== Release history ==
Region	Date	Label	Format	Catalog
United States	1995	Scratch	CD, LP	SCRATCH No. 20
