= Distracted Snowflake Volume One =

Studio album by Bugskull
- Released: 1997
- Genre: Experimental rock, lo-fi
- Length: 45:38
- Label: Pop Secret

Bugskull chronology
Snakland (1995)	Distracted Snowflake Volume One (1997)	Distracted Snowflake Volume Two (1999)

Professional ratings
Review scores
Source	Rating
Allmusic	4/5 stars

Distracted Snowflake Volume One is the fourth studio album by Bugskull, released in 1997 by Pop Secret.

== Track listing ==
All tracks are written by Sean Byrne.

No.	Title	Length
1.	"Ice Cream Daydream"	6:18
2.	"High Steppin'"	1:10
3.	"Flowers Smile"	4:47
4.	"Crying Moog"	1:08
5.	"Whinky's Wild Ride (The Quest)"	6:55
6.	"Last Train to the Elfin Village"	1:32
7.	"Grand Canyon"	2:39
8.	"Vacancy"	3:17
9.	"Ghosts Won"	2:53
10.	"Goodbye"	4:25
11.	"Mushmouth's March"	1:58
12.	"Sun"	8:36

== Personnel ==
Adapted from the Distracted Snowflake Volume One liner notes.

Musicians

- Brendan Bell – guitar (5), mixing
- Sean Byrne (as Bügsküll) – lead vocals, guitar, mixing, photography
- Mark Hansen – guitar (9, 12), bass guitar (6), Moog synthesizer (11), mixing
- James Yu – congas (12), mixing

Production and additional personnel

- Phil Quitslund – mixing
- Tiffany Scott – mixing, photography

== Release history ==
Region	Date	Label	Format	Catalog
United States	1997	Pop Secret	CD, LP	POP 006
