= Bugskull =

American musical group

- Also known as: Bügsküll
- Origin: Portland, Oregon, U.S.
- Genres: Experimental rock, lo-fi
- Years active: 1992–present
- Labels: Digitalis Recordings, Pop Secret, Scratch Records
- Members: Sean Byrne
- Past members: Brendan Bell; James Yu

Bugskull is an American musical group originally from Portland, Oregon, United States, that performed and recorded during the 1990s and early 2000s. According to a local newspaper, the Portland Mercury Review, discussing a one-off comeback concert they performed on September 12, 2009, they "delved deep into the world of ambience and electronics, exploring the outer brainscapes of music, littered with found sound, squeaks, whistles, drones, and hallucinations."

== Members ==
Current

- Sean Byrne – lead vocals, guitar (1992–present)

Former

- Brendan Bell – bass guitar, keyboards, saxophone, clarinet (1993–1997)
- James Yu – drums, violin (1993–1997)

== Discography ==
Studio albums

- Phantasies and Senseitions (Road Cone, 1994)
- Crock (Pop Secret, 1995)
- Snakland (Scratch, 1995)
- Distracted Snowflake Volume One (Pop Secret, 1997)
- Distracted Snowflake Volume Two (Scratch, 1999)
- Bugskull & The Big White Cloud (Scratch, 2000)
- Communication (Digitalis, 2009)
- Hidden Mountain (Almost Halloween Time, 2012)
- Collapsed View (Digitalis, 2014)

Compilation albums

- Time Is Not Our Fried (Eldest Son, 2009)

Cassette albums

- Subversives = Musgrove Complex (1992)
- Subversives in the Midst (Shrimper, 1992)
- Gargamelodies (Eldest Son, 1992)
- Magic Tremelo (Eldest Son, 1993)

EPs

- Bügsküll (Quixotic, 1993)

Singles

- "Fences" (Road Cone, 1992)
- "What I Had in Mind" (Dalmatian, 1993)
- "Bügsküll" / "Sone" (Ross, 1994)
- "Bügsküll" / "Quasi" (Red Rover, 1994)
