= Albert shako =

Shako worn in the British Army from 1844 to 1855

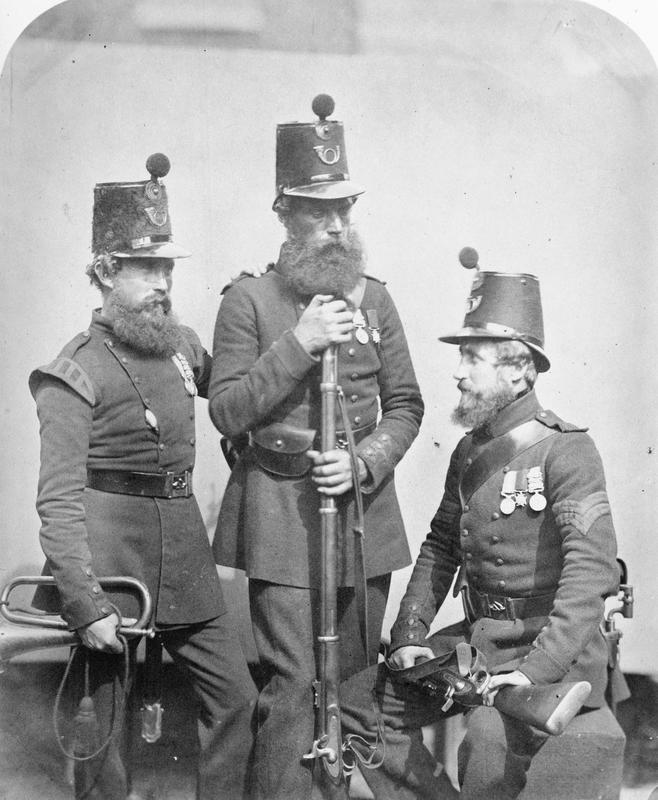
Rifle Brigade soldiers wearing Albert shakos, c. 1857

The Albert shako (also known as the Albert pot) is a shako that was worn in the British Army between 1844 and 1855. It was developed from the Albert hat proposed by Albert, Prince Consort, in 1843 as a replacement for the bell-top shako then in use. The Albert hat is 7 1/10 inches (18 cm) tall, 7/10 inch (1.8 cm) taller than the bell-top shako, and has a brim all around rather than just a peak to provide better protection from the sun. The hat includes innovative ventilation features.

The hat was ridiculed in the press when it was unveiled on 21 September 1843. The Duke of Wellington, who was then Commander-in-Chief of the British Army, made alterations to the hat. His version, which became known as the Albert shako, has a brim only at the front and rear. It entered service the following year, replacing the bell-top shakos worn by regiments of foot, light dragoons and the Corps of Royal Sappers and Miners. The shako was also worn by fusilier regiments and grenadier companies, who had previously worn a bearskin hat. The Albert shako was regarded as heavy and uncomfortable and was often replaced by a forage cap on active service. It was replaced in 1855 by the French pattern shako.

== Albert hat design ==
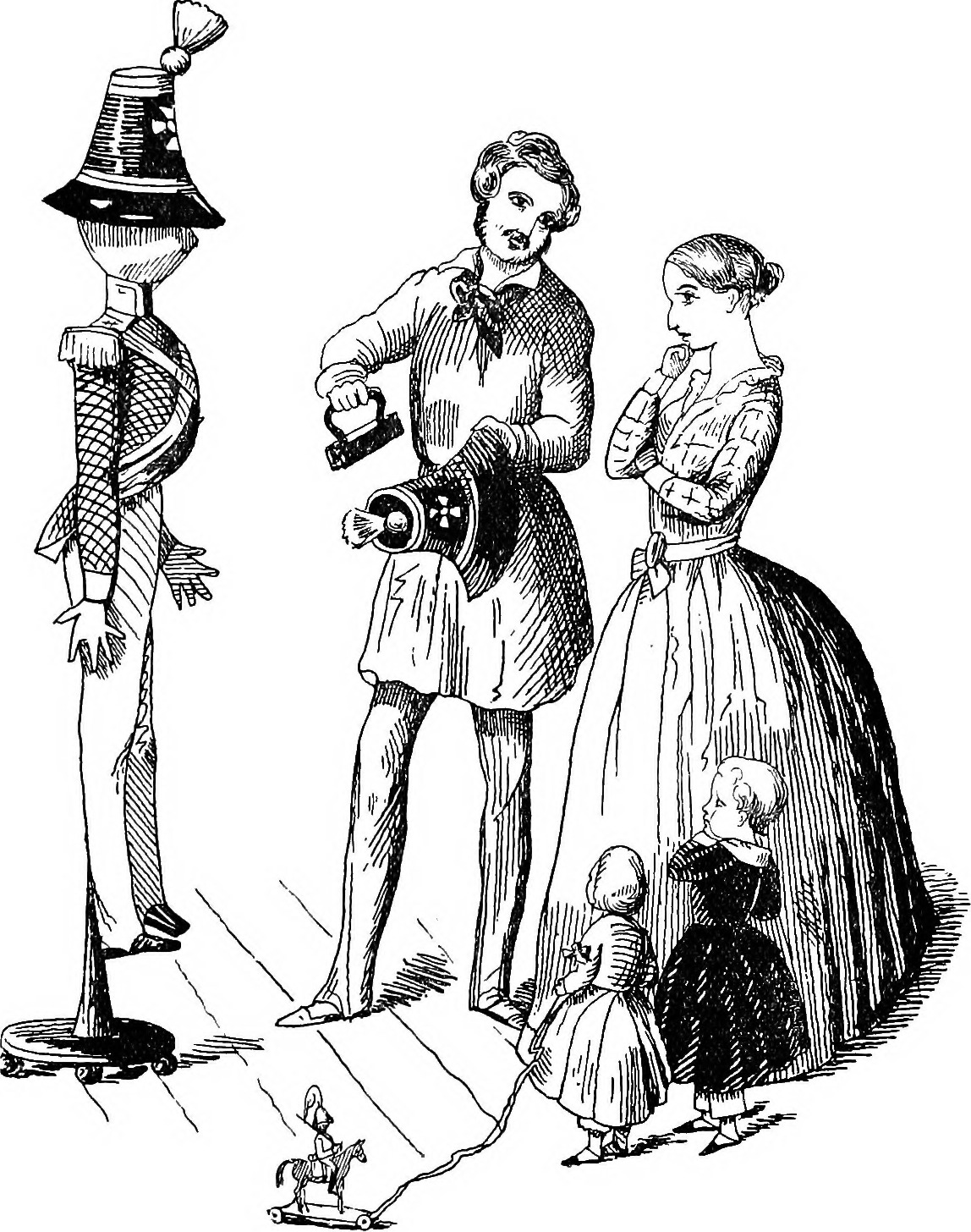
Prince Albert demonstrating the hat

The Albert hat was developed and partly designed by Albert, Prince Consort in 1843 as part of his campaign to modernise the uniform of the British Army, which he considered unpractical when compared to that worn by the Royal Navy. It was one of Albert's earliest involvements with the British Army, of which he had been appointed a field marshal in 1840 when he married Queen Victoria. The army had worn the 6 4/10-inch-tall (16 cm) bell-top shako since 1829. The Albert hat was 7 1/10 inches (18 cm) tall. While the bell-top shako had a brim only at the front the Albert hat had a 2 5/8-inch (6.7 cm) brim all round, intended to provide protection from the sun. It was this continuous brim that made the headgear a hat, rather than a shako.

While the bell-top shako was wider at the top than at the bottom the Albert hat tapered inwards, measuring 6 1/4 inches (16 cm) in diameter at the top. A ball at the front of the top of the hat played a similar role to the plumes on earlier shakoes; a ball had been used with the bell-top shako since 1835. Albert considered that previous shakoes had made the wearer's head hot, to the detriment of performance. He therefore introduced ventilation to his hat, which was a radical idea in this period. Two brass tiger heads on either side concealed ventilation holes while a further flap was incorporated, to be opened in hot climates. The hat was covered in black cloth, with a band of white worsted material around the bottom, and the brim was black leather. A shako plate was affixed to the front of the hat consisting of a royal crown above a Maltese cross marked with the regiment's number.

Some surviving examples bear the regimental number "I", it is likely this is just an example number rather than intended for issue to the 1st Regiment of Foot (Royal Scots) who were away on foreign service at the time. There is little evidence that the hat was produced in any great quantity, though a number may have been trialled by the 49th (Princess Charlotte of Wales's) (Hertfordshire) Regiment of Foot, newly returned from service in Hong Kong. Because of its limited issue the hat is rarer than its successor, the Albert shako, or the Albert helmet that was developed for the heavy cavalry. A surviving Albert hat is held in the collection of the National Army Museum.

Albert formally unveiled the hat on 21 September 1843. The hat was mocked in a Punch cartoon and in October the Illustrated London News said "public opinion has been so unequivocally expressed against it, that it is not likely to prove a popular substitution for the cap now in wear".

== Albert shako design ==
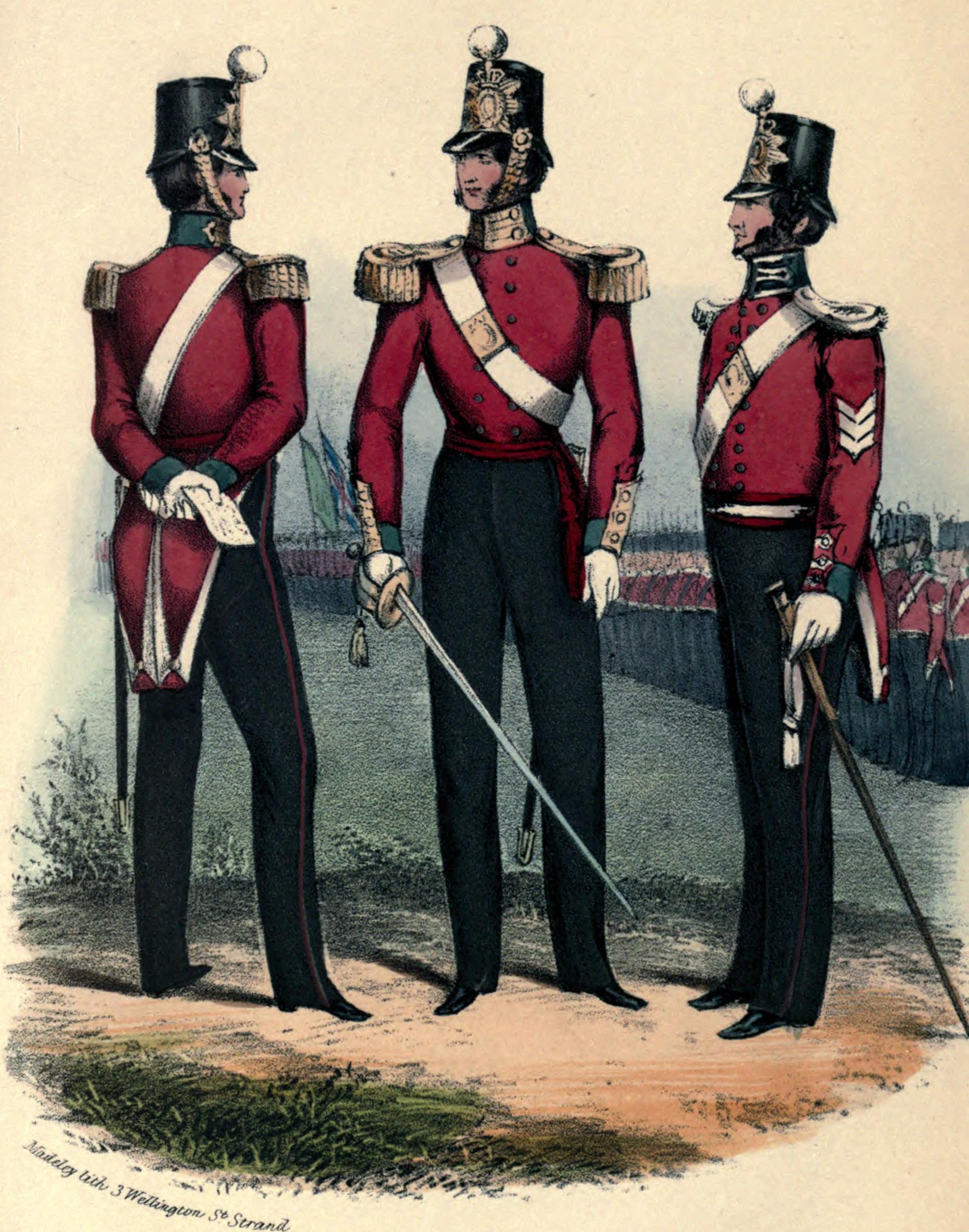
Two officers and a sergeant of the 73rd (Highland) Regiment of Foot depicted wearing the shako in 1851. In this depiction the sergeant (right) wears an officer's shako plate

In October 1843 the Duke of Wellington, who was Commander-in-Chief of the British Army, made alterations to the hat proposed by Albert. This included shortening it by 3 inches (7.6 cm), reducing the brim to a peak at the front and rear only and replacing the cross-shaped shako plate with one based on a star for line infantry regiments (and various designs for other units). Because the brim had been altered the new design became known as the Albert shako.

A 20 December 1843 article in the Illustrated London News noted that a further revision was made by hatters James Lock & Co. of St James's Street, London. The height of the shako increased to 6 3/4 inches (17 cm) (similar to that of the stovepipe shako used by the army from around 1800 to 1815), the brass tigers omitted and a chin strap introduced. The final design was similar to the shako then worn by the Austrian army.

The officers' shako was made of black beaver skin on a felt base. The top, bottom edge and brims were of black lacquered leather. The front peak extended to 2 3/8 inches (6.0 cm) and the rear peak to 1 1/4 inches (3.2 cm). The hat tapered slightly, measuring 1/4 inch (0.64 cm) less in diameter at the top than at its base. The chin strap was of leather over which a gilt chain was worn, affixed to the side of the shako with gilt rosettes. The other ranks' shako was the same as the officers' except that it was made of napped felt (and was therefore somewhat heavier) and the metal adornments were in brass rather than gilt. A waterproof cover was issued with the shako, for use in bad weather.

=== Shako plate ===
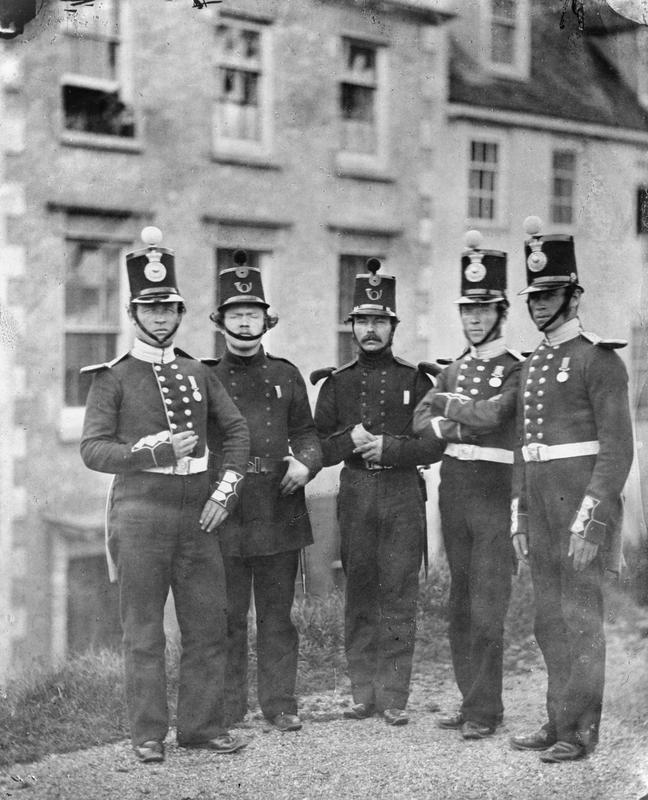
Other ranks of the Royal Marines and Rifle Brigade wearing the shako in 1855

Regulations specified that the shako plate for officers was to be in gilt, though examples with silver details are known for some regiments. The plate for officers of line infantry regiments is usually in the shape of an eight-pointed star, though some regiments used plates with 10 and 12 points, surmounted with a crown. Within this was a wreath of laurel and palm leaves and a garter which usually carried the name of the regiment, but sometimes its motto instead. The centre carried the regimental number. Battle honours were listed in the rays of the star. The shako plate of the other ranks was made from bronze and simpler in design. It was circular, surmounted by a crown, with the regimental number within a wreath.

Light companies (and light infantry regiments) were distinguished with a bugle in the centre of the plate, grenadier companies with a grenade. Fusilier regiments wore a grenade-shaped shako plate, rifle regiments one in bronze shaped like a bugle.

=== Plume ===
The ball-shaped plume (sometimes called a tuft) was retained from earlier shakos and the Albert hat. The ball was made of worsted and measured 2 1/2 inches (6.4 cm) in diameter. It was attached to the helmet by a metal mounting.

The colour of the plume varied to denote different roles. The line infantry wore red with a white tuft; light infantry regiments and the light companies of the line infantry wore green with a white tuft; fusilier regiments, the grenadier companies of line infantry regiments and the Royal Marines wore plain white and rifle regiments wore green with a black tuft. Regimental staff officers wore a plain red plume and field officers wore red horsehair in place of the plume.

== In service ==
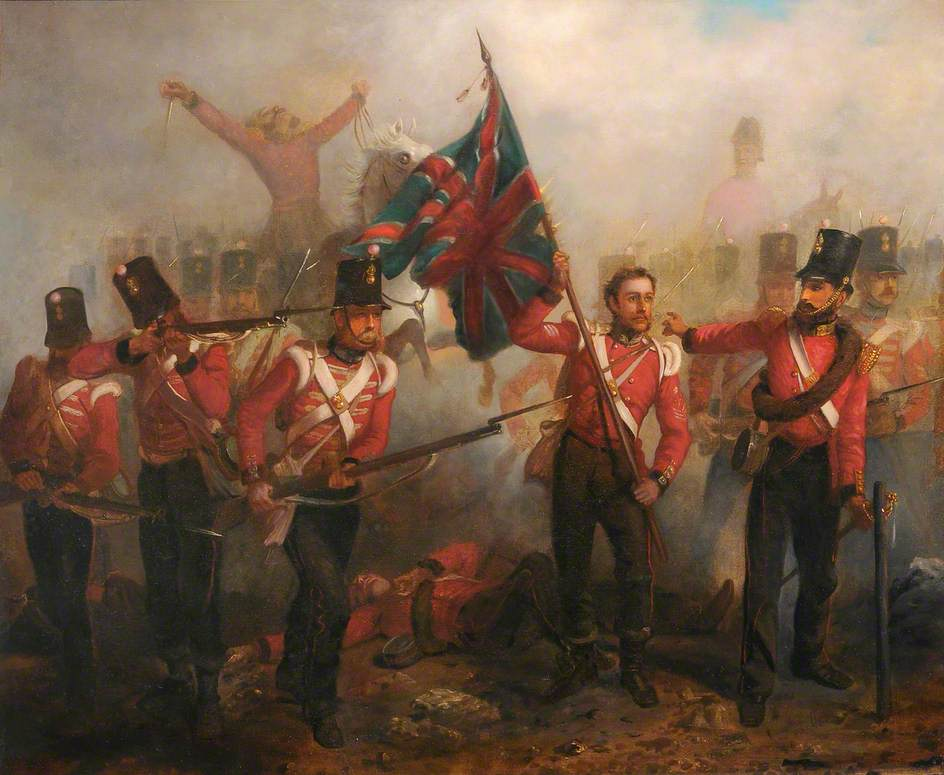
Soldiers of the 23rd Foot (Royal Welsh Fuzileers) wearing the shako during the Battle of Alma.

The Albert shako entered service in 1844, replacing the bell-top shako of the infantry regiments and the bearskins of the fusiliers and grenadier companies. The Foot Guards retained their bearskins and Highland regiments their feather bonnets. The light dragoon regiments and the Corps of Royal Sappers and Miners were also issued with the Albert shako. The hussar regiments and Royal Horse Artillery, who had previously worn the bell top shako, were ordered to wear a new hussar busby. The hussars found the busby too hot for service in India and the shako was permitted to be worn there with a white cotton cover that also helped protect the neck. The plain black shako was also worn occasionally in full dress uniform. In some regiments, such as the 10th Hussars the shako was decorated with gilt circlets around the top for officers and yellow lace for the other ranks. The 10th wore the shako with a black horsehair plume.

Soldiers complained that the Albert shako was heavy and uncomfortable. The shako was liable to fall off in action; an eyewitness from the 61st (South Gloucestershire) Regiment of Foot noted that the battlefield of Chillianwala in 1849 was littered with discarded shakoes. The shako saw one of its last widespread uses on active service in the Crimean War (1853–1856), as it was replaced in 1855. The shako was generally only worn in the earlier battles of the war such as Alma and Inkerman, being replaced by the round forage cap in later actions. Colonel George Bell of the 1st Regiment of Foot (Royal Scots) complained in 1854: "The next thing I want to pitch aside is the abominable Albert, as it is called, whereon a man may fry his ration beef at mid-day in this climate, the top being patent leather to attract a 10 fold more portion of the sun's rays to madden his brain".

The Albert shako's formal replacement was the 1855 French pattern shako, introduced as part of reforms that year that reduced the amount of decorative details on British Army uniforms. The French pattern shako was shorter and is sometimes described as a kepi. It is not known if the reduction in size was to improve comfort or just in imitation of the headgear then worn by the French army. The ball-shaped plumes of the Albert shako were retained on the new headgear. The Albert shako was retained by the Sappers and Miners until 1857, when they were issued with busbies. The shako continued in service in the yeomanry long after it had been replaced in the regular forces. Yeomanry officers often wore the shako with feather plumes and their men with horsehair plumes rather than the ball plumes mandated for the regulars.
