= Distracted Snowflake Volume Two =

Studio album by Bugskull
- Released: March 23, 1999
- Genre: Experimental rock, lo-fi
- Length: 43:47
- Label: Scratch

Bugskull chronology
| Distracted Snowflake Volume One (1997) | Distracted Snowflake Volume Two (1999) | Bugskull & The Big White Cloud (2000) |

Distracted Snowflake Volume Two is the fifth studio album by Bugskull, released on March 23, 1999 by Scratch Records.

== Track listing ==
All tracks are written by Sean Byrne.

| No. | Title | Length |
|---|---|---|
| 1. | "Charmed Life" | 7:53 |
| 2. | "Cosmic Western Live Song" | 1:56 |
| 3. | "Trippindicular" | 3:47 |
| 4. | "Broke Like a Ghost (Ice Age Blues)" | 9:11 |
| 5. | "Ballard of the Glad Mosquito" | 4:01 |
| 6. | "Taming the Cobra's Heart" | 3:42 |
| 7. | "West Coastin'" | 5:27 |
| 8. | "Distracted Snowflake" | 7:50 |

== Personnel ==
Adapted from the Distracted Snowflake Volume Two liner notes.

- Brendan Bell – organ
- Sean Byrne – lead vocals, guitar
- Mark Hansen – bass guitar, organ, Moog synthesizer
- James Yu – drums

== Release history ==
| Region | Date | Label | Format | Catalog |
|---|---|---|---|---|
| United States | 1999 | Scratch | CD | SCRATCH No. 29 |
