= Time Is Not Our Fried =

Compilation album by Bugskull
- Released: September 12, 2009
- Recorded: 1992 – 1994
- Genre: Experimental rock, lo-fi
- Length: 135:21
- Label: Digitalis

Bugskull chronology
Bugskull & The Big White Cloud (2000)	Time Is Not Our Fried (2009)	Communication (2009)

Time Is Not Our Fried is a compilation album by Bugskull, released on November 17, 2009, by Digitalis Recordings. It is a two-CD set collecting remixed and remastered material from early Bugskull cassettes, and vinyl and compilation releases.

== Track listing ==
All tracks are written by Sean Byrne.

Disc one
No.	Title	From album (date)	Length
1.	"I've Got the Dope"	Subversives = Musgrove Complex CS (1992)	5:19
2.	"Death Comes Closer for Us All"	Subversives = Musgrove Complex CS (1992)	11:49
3.	"Chains"	Subversives = Musgrove Complex CS (1992)	6:47
4.	"Dope Smoking Son"	Gargamelodies CS (1992)	6:34
5.	"Lewis"	Gargamelodies CS (1992)	2:32
6.	"Fences"	Gargamelodies CS (1992)	7:02
7.	"Space Shuttle"	Gargamelodies CS (1992)	3:56
8.	"Muerange"	Magic Tremelo CS (1993)	9:32
9.	"Stand on Your Head"		3:07
10.	"Not the Fall"	Gargamelodies CS (1992)	6:24
11.	"Its Gonna Be Pretty Angular"	Cantankerous Jack Lord Feeder Operation compilation (1993)	2:47

Disc two
No.	Title	From album (date)	Length
1.	"My Dream Is of Destruction"	Magic Tremelo CS (1993)	9:40
2.	"All Members Please Rise"	What I Had In Mind 7" (1993)	6:29
3.	"Disclaimer"	Gargamelodies CS (1992)	7:52
4.	"Stiff as a Board"	Fences 7" (1992)	7:21
5.	"Mandroid"	I Present This compilation (1994)	1:18
6.	"False Alarm"	Bügsküll EP (1993)	6:11
7.	"Next Wave"	Bügsküll EP (1993)	6:03
8.	"Sunny Day Song"	Bügsküll EP (1993)	11:16
9.	"The Bloat"	Bügsküll/Sone 7" (1994)	2:11
10.	"Exit"	Bügsküll/Sone 7" (1994)	5:51
11.	"Pure Love"	Bügsküll/Quasi 7" (1994)	5:22

== Release history ==
Region	Date	Label	Format
United States	2009	Eldest Son	CD
