= Phantasies and Senseitions =

Studio album by Bügsküll
- Released: 1994
- Recorded: 1993 – 1994
- Studio: Red Light Studios, Portland, OR
- Genre: Experimental rock, lo-fi
- Length: 54:53
- Label: Road Cone
- Producer: Brendan Bell, Sean Byrne

Bügsküll chronology
Phantasies and Senseitions (1994)	Crock: Original Motion Picture Soundtrack (1995)

Phantasies and Senseitions is the debut studio album of Bügsküll, released in 1994 by Road Cone.

== Critical reception ==
A critic for Alternative Press compared the band favorably to The Residents, Sun Ra, The Orb, Eggs and early Sebadoh, saying the music "has the refreshing splendor of naive folk art, that sense of being timeless and utterly natural." He lauded the band for their sense of adventure and concluded that "Bugskull breathe ingenuity like the rest of us breathe oxygen." In a mixed review, Dean Suzuki of the music journal Option described the album as "a skittish and disorienting spectrum of different musical genres" and likened it to "listening to the soundtrack of a hyperactive and artily pretentious foreign film." He concluded by saying that although the band was talented that they needed to tighten their sound

== Track listing ==
All tracks are written by Sean Byrne.

No.	Title	Length
1.	"Intro"	0:51
2.	"Shorty"	2:13
3.	"Opening Theme"	1:29
4.	"Inhuman"	4:16
5.	"Elfin Majic"	3:42
6.	"Recoder"	4:27
7.	"Old Towne"	2:32
8.	"Concave Life"	3:09
9.	"Long Corridor, No. 6"	3:10
10.	"Almost Blue"	2:49
11.	"Seguara"	4:06
12.	"Big Ronnie"	0:58
13.	"Sit on This"	2:56
14.	"Concrete Boots"	3:05
15.	"Olympic"	4:43
16.	"Death Valley '94"	2:24
17.	"Choosegase"	2:37
18.	"Space"	5:26

== Personnel ==
Adapted from the Phantasies and Senseitions liner notes.

Bügsküll

- Brendan Bell – bass guitar, keyboards, saxophone, clarinet, production, engineering, mixing
- Sean Byrne – lead vocals, guitar, keyboards, clarinet, percussion, production, engineering, cover art
- James Yu – drums, violin, design

Production and additional personnel

- Aaron Day – guitar (6), drums and clarinet (10)
- Suzie Ziegler – bass guitar (11)

== Release history ==
Region	Date	Label	Format	Catalog
United States	1994	Road Cone	CD, LP	RoCo 007
