= JCM =

JCM may refer to:

== People ==
- James Clerk Maxwell (1831–1879), Scottish physicist
- John Cougar Mellencamp (born 1951), American singer
- John Cameron Mitchell (born 1963), American actor, playwright, and singer

== Science and technology ==
- Japan Collection of Microorganisms
- Jaynes-Cummings model
- Journal of Clinical Microbiology
- Journal of Communications
- AGM-169 Joint Common Missile
- JunoCam, a camera on a planned space probe to the planet Jupiter

== Other uses ==
- Jewish Children's Museum
- Jackson Central-Merry High School, a public high school in Jackson, Tennessee
- Joint Council of Municipalities
- Joint Crediting Mechanism, bilateral financing by Japanese government
