= Shako =

Tall, cylindrical military cap with a visor

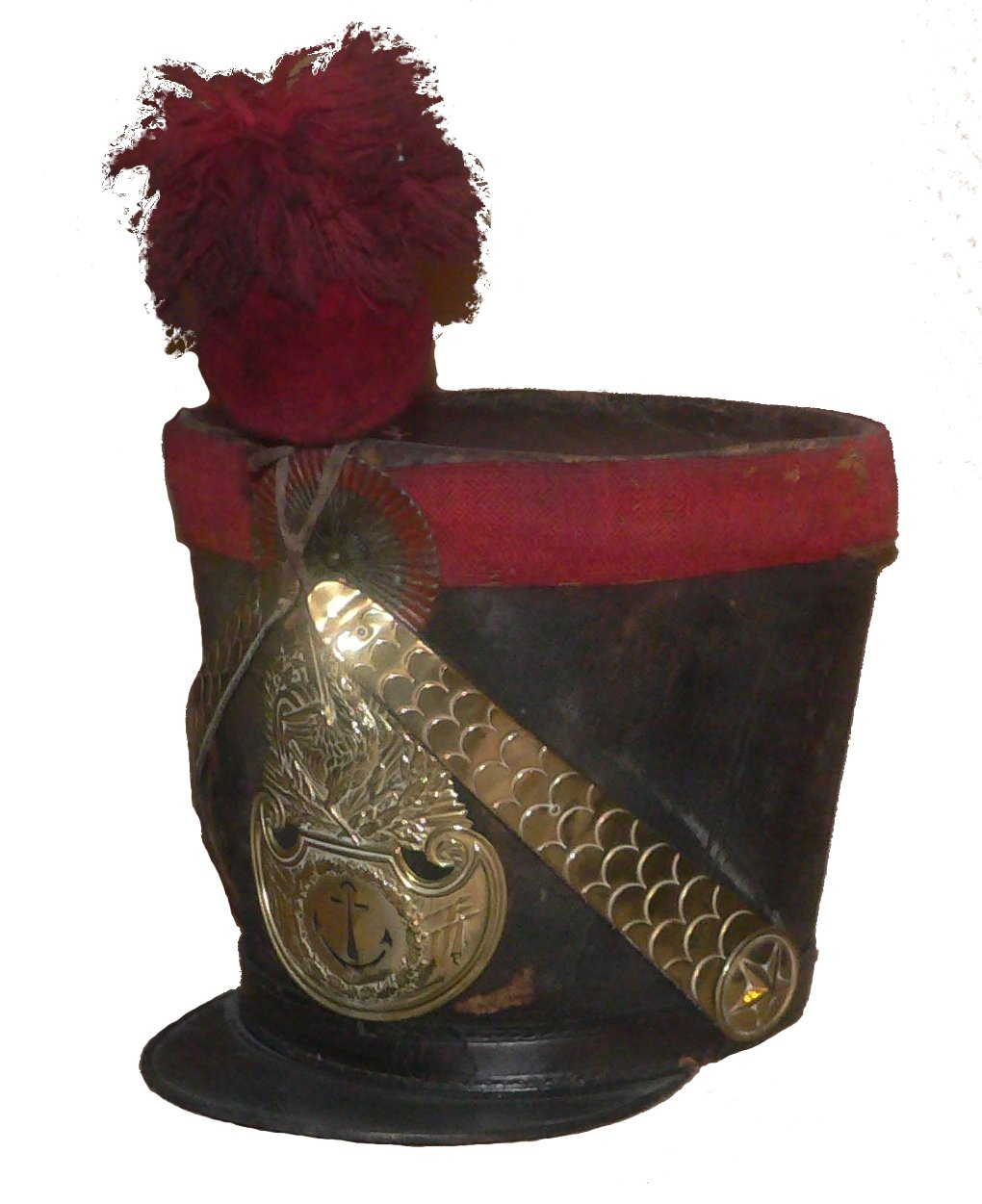
A shako of the French troupes de marine, c. 1829

A shako or shacko (/ˈʃækoʊ/, /ˈʃeɪkoʊ/, or /ˈʃɑːkoʊ/) is a tall, cylindrical military cap, usually with a peak, and sometimes tapered at the top. It is usually adorned with an ornamental plate or badge on the front, metallic or otherwise; and often has a feather, hackle, or pompom attached at the top.

Extensively used as an item of military headgear during the nineteenth and early twentieth centuries, the shako now survives as part of some ceremonial uniforms.

== Origins ==
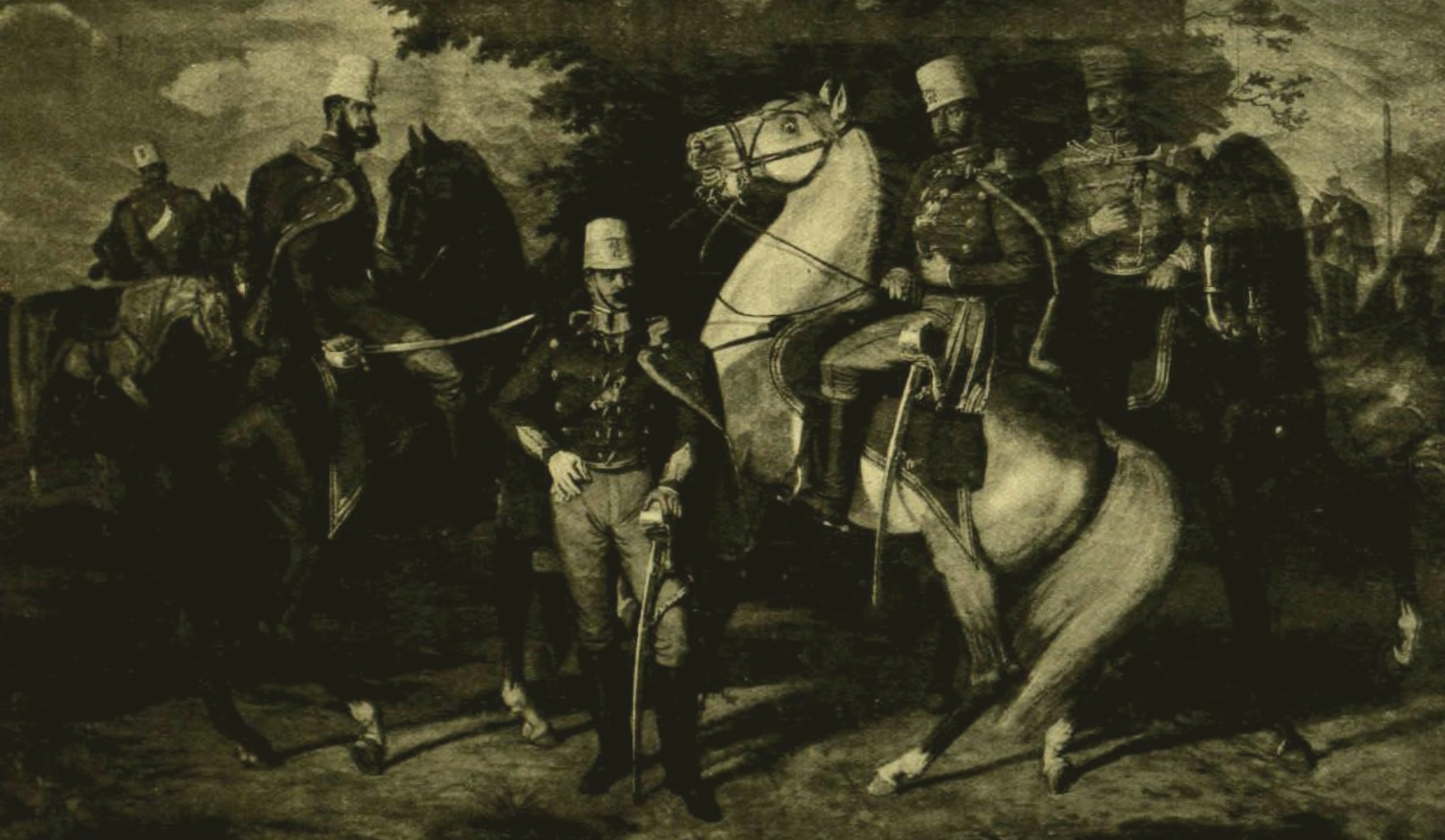
Hungarian hussars wearing shakos in 1849

The word shako originated from the Hungarian name csákó for the peak, which Hungarian border soldiers (Grenz-Infanterie) added around 1790 to their previously visorless stovepipe-style hats. Originally these hats were part of the clothing commonly worn by shepherds, before being added to the uniform of the Hungarian hussar in the early 18th century.

Other spellings include chako, czako, sjako, schako, schakot, and tschako. From 1800 on, the shako began being adopted by European armies, replacing bicornes in most instances. George III issued a general order on 24 February 1800 which ordered British infantrymen and artillerymen to replace their tricornes with shakos. Made of heavy felt and leather, the shako more easily retained its shape and provided some protection for the wearers head, while its visor shaded his eyes.

It retained this preeminence until the mid-19th century, when spiked helmets began to appear in the army of Prussia, which influenced armies of the various German states; and the more practical kepi replaced it for all but parade wear in the French Army. The Imperial Russian Army substituted a spiked helmet for the shako in 1844–45 but returned to the latter headdress in 1855, before adopting a form of kepi in 1864. Following the Franco-Prussian War of 1870, military fashions changed and cloth or leather helmets based on the German headdress began to supersede the shako in many armies.

Although the mid-19th century shako was impressive in appearance and enhanced the wearer's height, it was also heavy and provided little protection against bad weather, as most were made of cloth or felt material over a leather body and peak. Many armies utilized specially designed oilskin covers to protect the shako and the wearer from heavy rain while on campaign. The shako provided little protection from enemy attack, beyond giving partial shielding of the head from enemy cavalry sabres.

During the period of general peace that followed the Napoleonic Wars, the shako in European armies became a showy and impractical headdress best suited for the parade ground. As an example, the Regency shako adopted by British Army officers in 1822 was 8 1/2 inches (22 cm) in height and 11 inches (28 cm) across at the crown, with ornamental gold cords and lace. Lieutenant Colonel George Anthony Legh Keck can be seen in an 1851 portrait wearing a "broad-topped" shako topped by a 12-inch (30 cm) white plume and held in place by bronze chin scales. The Regency shako was followed in the British Army by a succession of models—"Bell-topped", "Albert", "French" and "Quilted"—until the adoption of the Home Service helmet in 1877.

== Variations ==
The French light infantry shako ("stovepipe") was prescribed in October 1801. There were patterns with and without visors but the shako's body was always cylindrical. In February 1806 a line infantry shako of different pattern was adopted. Its body was semi-conical, with the top being wider than the brim. The line infantry pattern was 18 cm high and 23 cm wide at its largest diameter.

In November 1810 the shako's dimensions slightly altered to 19 cm height and a top of 24.4 cm diameter, the top now made of hard leather. The former decorations of cords and tassels were forbidden, since chin scales were added to the design (brass for line infantry, white metal for light infantry). The shako front was ornamented by a metal lozenge bearing the regimental number surmounted by a 7 cm tricolour cockade. Decorative bands in gold or silver around the top circumference indicated the officer ranks: from a 34 mm band with an additional 14 mm band located 20 mm below (colonel, the only officer with two shako bands) to a single 18 mm band (sub-lieutenant or adjutant-non-commissioned officer, the latter with a red silk lozenge pattern woven in to it).

In 1812, the front plate lozenge was replaced by an eagle surmounting a crest with the regimental number. Prior to 1806 the light infantry shakos were ornamented by a metal bugle (chasseurs) or simply by a tricolour cockade (carabiniers) and coloured cords or straps. Whereas in 1801 the cockade was placed on the shako's left or right side, it later moved to the front.

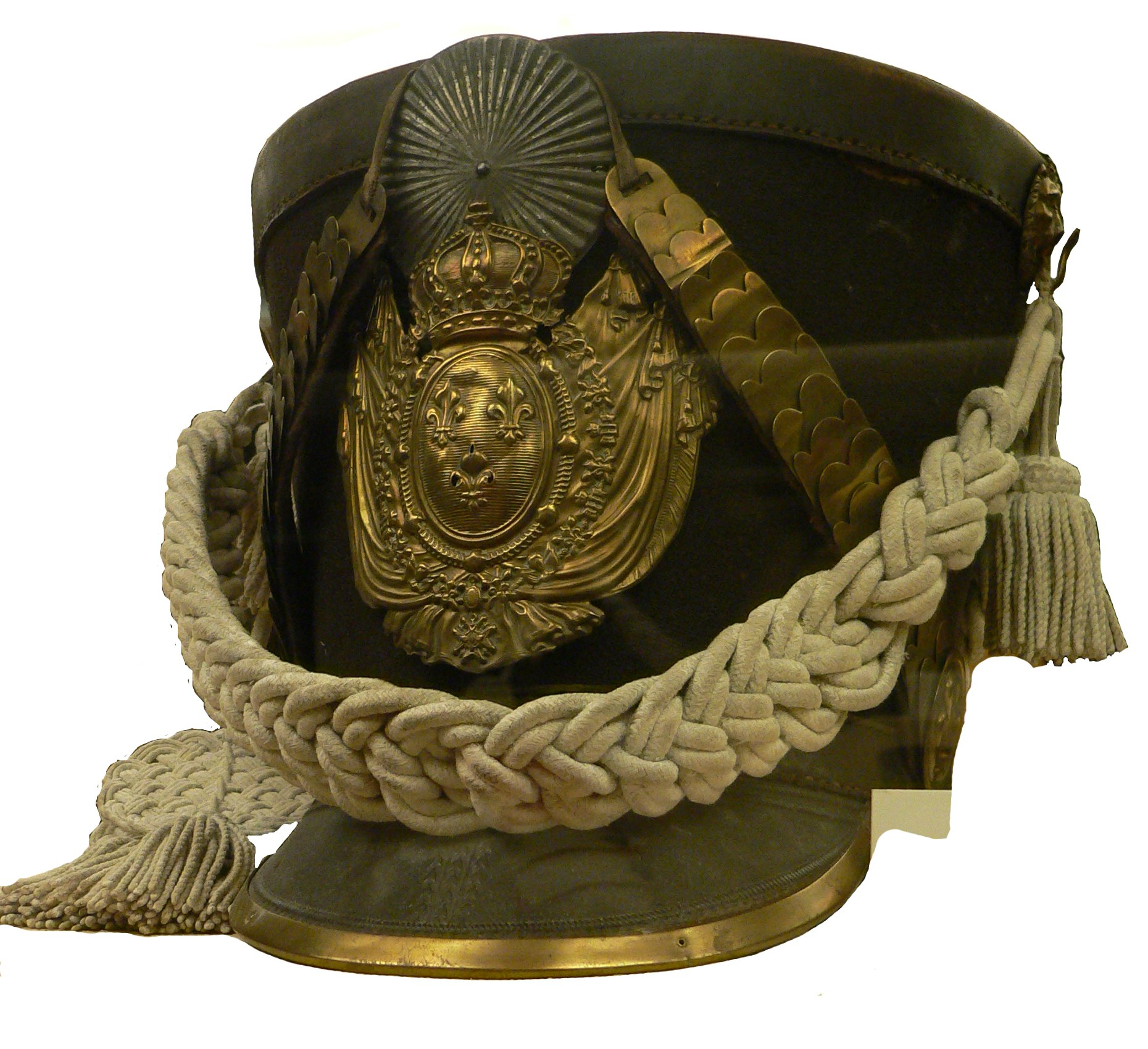
A Shako of the French Royal Guard as worn from 1816 to 1830

The British pattern "stovepipe" shako was a tall, cylindrical type with a brass badge attached to the front that began replacing bicornes from 24 February 1800 onwards. The stovepipe shako was used by infantry and artillery units of Britain's regular army, militia, Volunteer Corps and Fencible Corps along with European units of the East India Company's Presidency armies and other colonial forces. In the US Army, a lower felt shako superseded the top hat style, bearskin crest surmounted "round hat" in 1810.

The "Belgic" shako was a black felt shako with a raised front introduced in the Portuguese Marine Corps in 1797 and then in the Portuguese Army in 1806, as the barretina. It was later adopted by the British Army, officially replacing the stovepipe shako on 18 March 1812, but did not completely replace it until 1815 and therefore was also known as the "Waterloo" shako. This cumbersome headgear was already discarded in 1816, in favour of the slightly bell topped "Regency" shako. The Belgic shako was decorated with silver or gold lace for officers, according to regimental practice. In 1813 the US Army adopted a similar entirely leather made model, nicknamed by the soldiers as "Tombstone" cap, because of the extension of the top front that reminded on a grave marker.

In the Imperial Russian Army a cylindrical shako was adopted in 1803 for musketeers, and by grenadiers and fusiliers in 1805. It was replaced by the distinctive kiwa (also kiver) shako between 1812 and 1816. The kiwa was worn again from 1910 by infantry regiments of the Imperial Guard, and since 2006 as part of the Kremlin Regiment's ceremonial uniform. Its distinguishing feature was the dished or concave top. This style of shako was worn by the Black Brunswickers alongside shakos of the Austrian pattern.

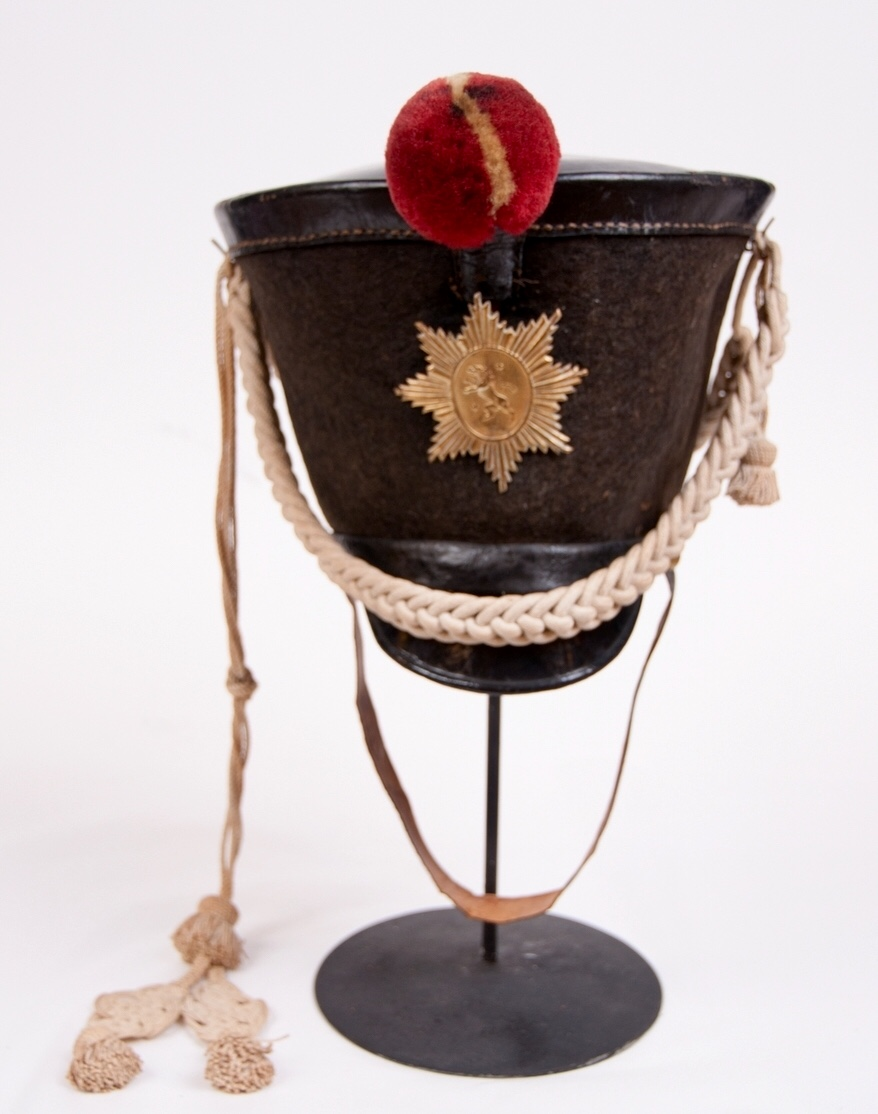
A Swedish shako m/1815 of the Royal Kronoberg Regiment, worn from 1815 to 1831

In 1815 the Russian style shako was adopted by the Royal Swedish army as shako m/1815. The Swedish shako was made of black felt with a leather visor and crown. The shako was equipped with a banderole, brass badge with the regiment's coat of arms, cockade and a pompon as a company sign. The officers' shako was also equipped with a yellow plume. In 1831 the m/1815 shako was replaced by a new model, the m/1831. This shako was taller and lighter than its predecessor. The front was adorned with a brass badge with the Swedish coat of arms, three crowns, and a plate with the name of the regiment, a yellow cockade of leather and a pompon.

The bell-top shako was a large and elaborate type which became popular in the 1820s and 1830s when there was little warfare between the major European powers and practicality on the battlefield became less important than appearance on the parade ground. It featured a crown that clearly flared outwards towards the top, giving a distinctive bell shape, and was often adorned with decorative cords and plumes. British troops were accoutered with the bell-top shako from 1829 to 1844.

In 1813, US troops followed that example by adopting the "yeoman" crown cap for artillery and rifle regiments, followed by the bell crown cap (with concave sides) from 1821. The US shakos changed again from 1832 to 1851, when a leather-made "cap" for infantry and artillery was introduced, resembling the former "yeoman" crown cap. Dragoons were issued with a cap model, whose crown was smaller than the cap's base. All those models were dropped in between 1851 and 1854, in favour of a cloth made shako of smaller size and swung shape, similar to the British "Albert" shako.

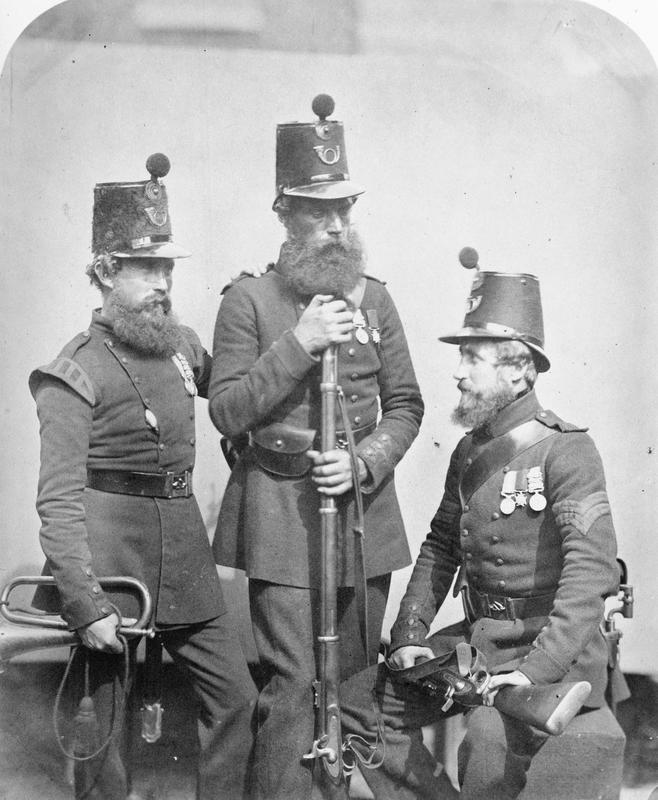
Rifle Brigade soldiers wearing Albert shakos, c. 1857

The Albert shako was a British design introduced in 1844, which was intended to be more practical than previous models. It featured a lower crown that tapered inwards at the top, and a second peak at the back intended to protect the wearer's neck from the sun. It is named after Prince Albert who supposedly designed it. It was not popular, and during the Crimean War a round "undress cap" was often worn instead. It was eventually replaced by smaller, lighter versions.

In the British Army it was the so-called French pattern shako (1855–1861), the quilted shako (1861–1869) and a last shako model (1869–1878), as lower and more ornamented version intended to be worn on parades only. The last two shako models were made of dark blue cloth mounted on a cork base. The shako was finally superseded for most British regiments by the Home Service helmet in 1878.

In the US Army, the last shako model of 1872 (a cut-down version of the 1851–1854 pattern) was replaced by the spiked helmet in 1882. Cavalry and artillery had adopted the helmet already in 1872. For undress or campaign dress, forage caps and felt hats had replaced the shako style cap since 1825 respectively 1855.

The Bengal Native Infantry of the British East India Company's army worn a version of the bell-top shako as described above, although lacking a vizor or peak. Frequently portrayed in contemporary illustrations as being worn by mutinous sepoys during the Great Indian Rebellion of 1857, this headdress was actually replaced by the Kilmarnock cap ten years before.

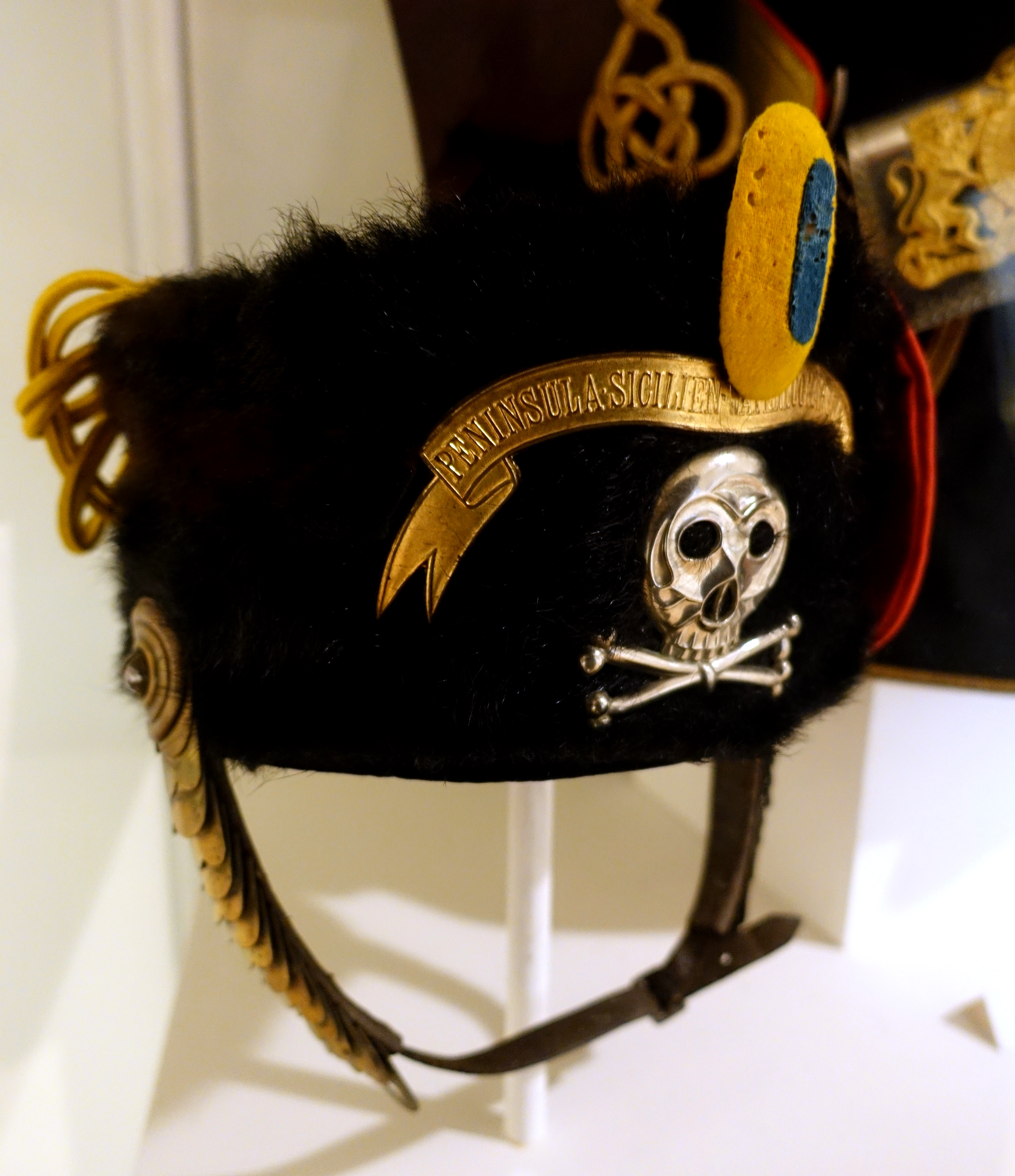
A busby used by a German hussar regiment, c. 1910

Busby is the English name for the Hungarian prémes csákó ('fur shako') or kucsma, a military head-dress made of fur, originally worn by Hungarian hussars. In its original Hungarian form the busby was a cylindrical fur cap, having a bag of coloured cloth hanging from the top. This bag could be filled with sand and the end attached to the right shoulder as a defence against sabre cuts.

== Final period of extensive wear ==
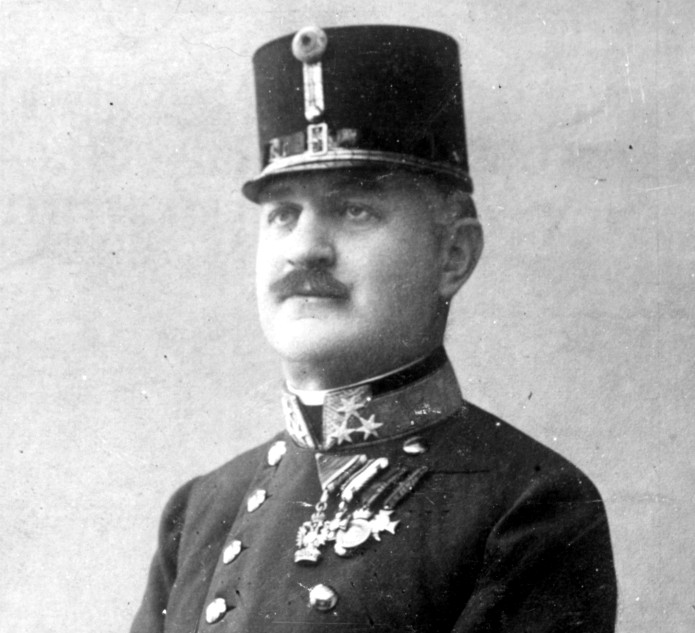
Alfred Redl, an Austrian military officer, in a shako, 1907

In 1914, the shako was still being worn in France (by chasseurs à cheval, infantry of the Republican Guard, chasseurs d'Afrique and hussars); in Imperial Germany (Jäger, Landwehr and marines); in Austro-Hungary (officers of all branches for off-duty wear, full dress of non-Muslim line infantry, artillery, engineers and only hussars in both full and field dress); in Russia (full dress of generals, staff officers, and infantry, engineers and artillery of the Imperial Guard).

In Belgium the shako was official field dress for line infantry, chasseurs à pied, engineers, transport/ambulance, administration, fortress artillery, and mounted chasseurs, although after the early weeks of the outbreak of war it was usually discarded in favour of the "undress" cap. In Denmark it remained part of the full dress of Guard Hussars; in Mexico (full dress of federal troops of all branches); in Portugal (military cadets); in Romania (full dress of artillery); in Italy (horse artillery and military academies); and in Spain (line infantry, cazadores, engineers, and artillery).

The Highland Light Infantry and Scottish Rifles of the British Army retained small shakos for full dress. The 1911 Encyclopædia Britannica states that there were plans to reintroduce the shako as parade dress for all English, Irish and Welsh line infantry regiments - a project that was interrupted by the outbreak of World War I. The Swiss and Dutch armies wore shakos, even for field wear, until after 1916. The Japanese Army had worn the shako as a parade headdress until 1905, although a form of high-sided kepi had been the normal wear.

During this final period of elaborate and colourful traditional uniforms, the shako varied widely from army to army in height, colour, trim and profile. Amongst the most distinctive of these were the high Napoleonic shako (kiver) worn by the Russian Imperial Guard and the low streamlined model (ros) of the Spanish Army. The Swiss version had black-leather peaks at both front and rear - a feature that also appeared in the shako-like headdress that was worn by British postmen between 1896 and 1910, and New Zealand policemen of the same period.

Most German police forces adopted a version of the Jäger shako after World War I, which replaced the spiked leather helmet (Pickelhaube) that had become identified with the previous Imperial regime. This new headdress survived several political changes and was worn by the civilian police forces of the Weimar Republic, Nazi Germany, East Germany, and West Germany. It disappeared in the 1970s, when the police forces of West Germany adopted a standardised green and light fawn uniform that included the high-fronted peaked cap that is still worn.

== Modern use ==
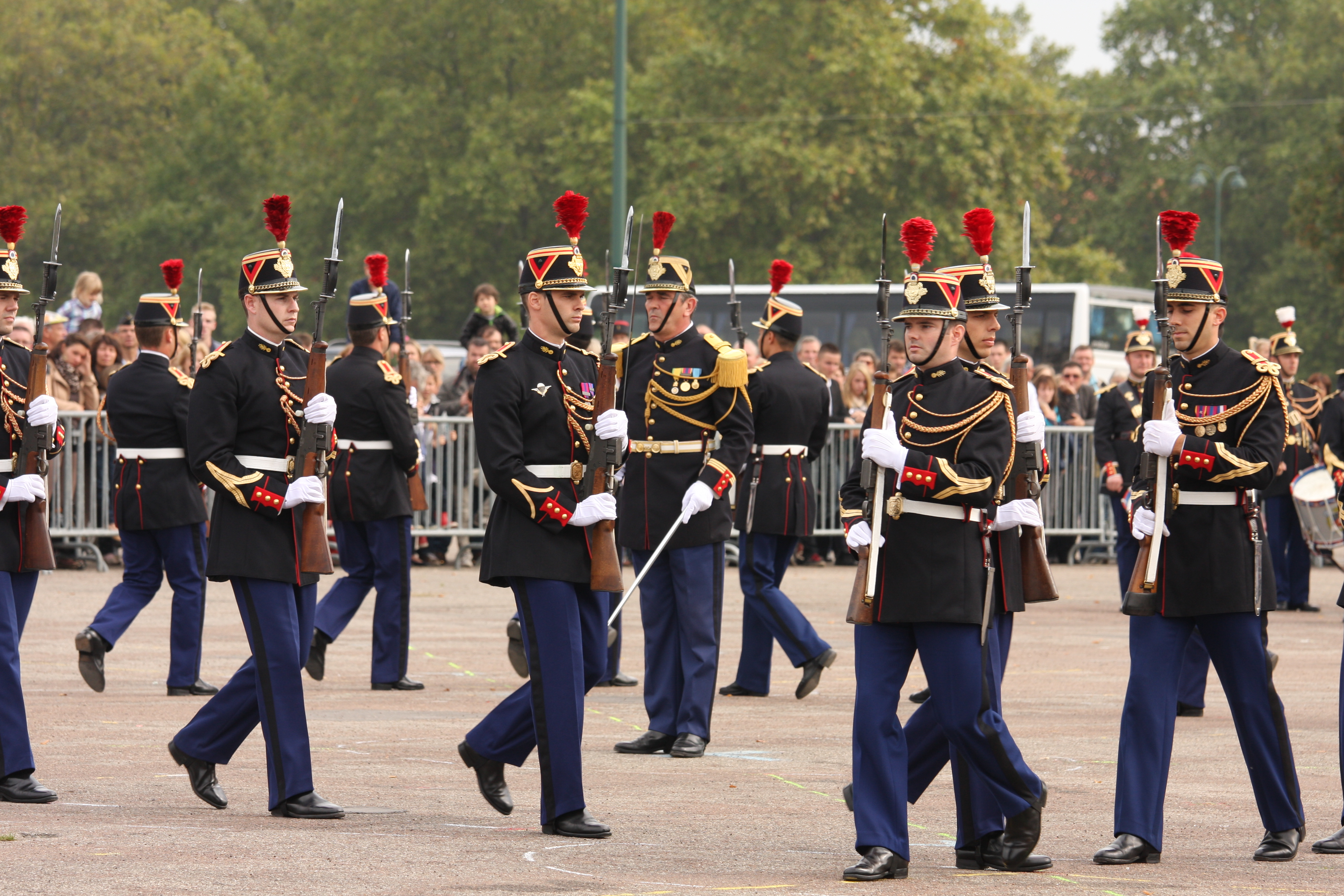
Members of the French Republican Guard

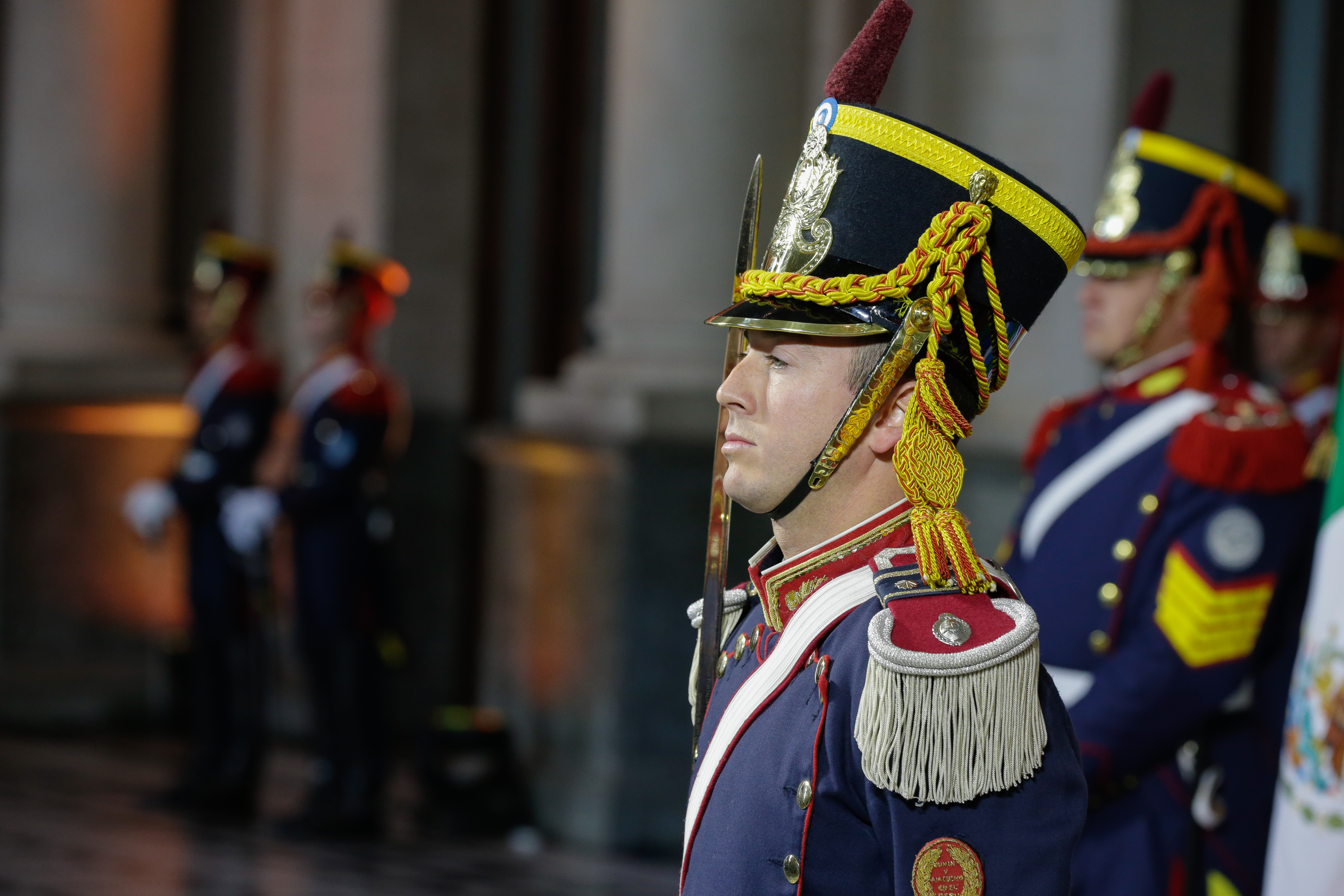
Members of the Argentine Mounted Grenadiers Regiment

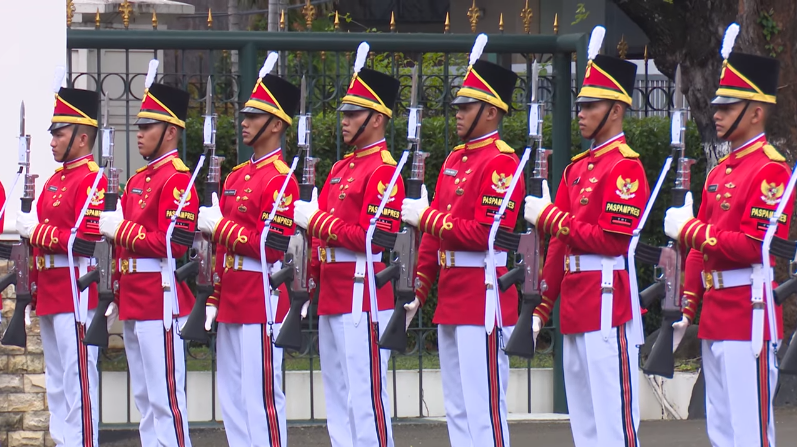
Members of the Presidential Security Force of Indonesia

Several police forces and armed forces retain shakos as a part of their ceremonial dress.

In Europe, the infantry of the French Republican Guard, cadets at Saint-Cyr, cadets at the Belgian Royal Military Academy, cadets at the Portuguese Colégio Militar and Pupilos do Exército military schools, the Italian Horse Guards Corps, Horse Artillery and cadets at the Military Academy of Modena, the Danish Guard Hussar Regiment, and the Spanish Royal Guard and 1st King's Immemorial Infantry Regiment all have shakos as part of their respective ceremonial uniforms. In Russia, the historic kiver was reintroduced in 2006 for wear by the Kremlin Guards on ceremonial occasions.

Several countries in the Americas, including Venezuela, Mexico, Brazil, Peru, Ecuador, Uruguay and Argentina, retain shakos for ceremonial guard or military academy uniforms. In the United States, shakos are still worn as full-dress headgear by cadets of West Point (where it is known colloquially as a tarbucket), Virginia Military Institute, The Citadel, Marion Military Institute, New York Military Academy, and Valley Forge Military Academy and College (in a modified form) with their Full Dress Grey uniforms. In the Canadian Forces, Les Voltigeurs de Québec are authorized to wear dark green shakos with full-dress uniforms.

In India, the Madras Sappers & Miners of the Madras Engineer Group wear dark-blue visorless shakos as part of their ceremonial uniform - a unique survival from the early 19th century. An Indonesian ceremonial unit, as well as the cadet corps of the military academies of the Philippines and South Korea, also use shakos.

== Modern non-military use ==
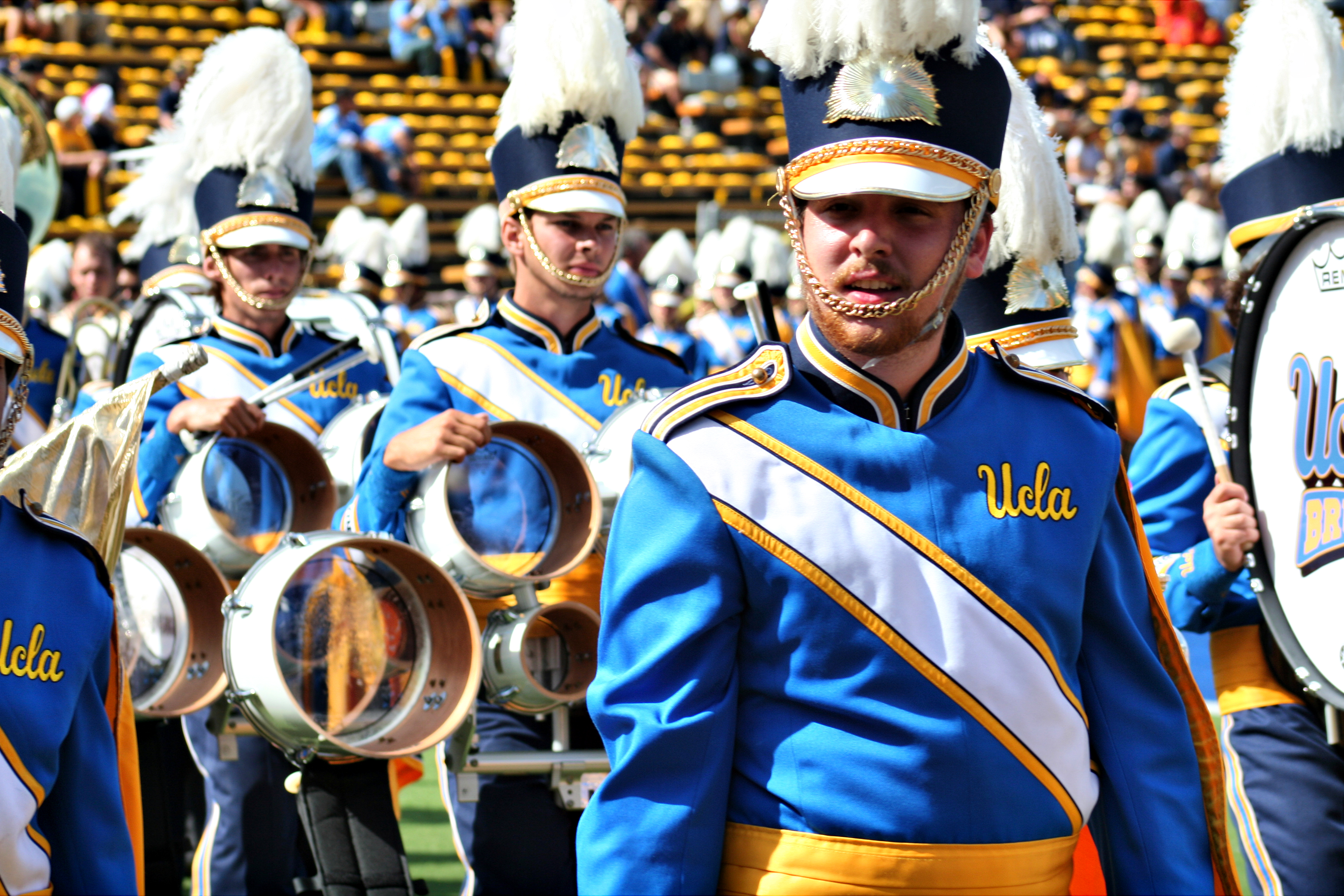
Members of the UCLA Bruin Marching Band wearing shakos

In the US and the Philippines, shakos are frequently worn by civilian marching bands and drum corps. In the latter country, the cadets of some civilian institutions such as the Philippine National Police Academy, and some colleges and high schools, also use the shako, although peaked "service cap" styles have become more popular in recent years. Those shako styles still in use in marching bands are generally quite tall and have elaborate plumes. These shakos are typical of marching band drum majors.

In drum corps and corps-style marching bands, the chin strap is rarely worn under the chin; instead, it is worn just under the lower lip, in the style of cadets at West Point.

== See also ==
- List of hat styles
- List of headgear
- Headgear of the United States Army
- Tin soldiers
- Busby
