= Communication (Bugskull album) =

Studio album by Bugskull
- Released: November 17, 2009
- Genre: Experimental rock, lo-fi
- Length: 39:51
- Label: Digitalis

Bugskull chronology
Time Is Not Our Fried (2009)	Communication (2009)	Hidden Mountain (2012)

Communication is the seventh studio album by Bugskull, released on November 17, 2009 by Digitalis Recordings.

== Track listing ==
All tracks are written by Sean Byrne.

Side one
No.	Title	Length
1.	"Floppy Drive"	2:43
2.	"High Steppin' II"	3:34
3.	"Hazy Window"	3:50
4.	"Remarkably Human"	3:52
5.	"Exposed Wires"	5:59

Side two
No.	Title	Length
1.	"Squeeky Bagpipe"	2:57
2.	"Communication"	6:03
3.	"Pondlife"	4:46
4.	"Subterranian (sic) Flight"	4:26
5.	"What's That Light?"	2:42

== Personnel ==
Adapted from the Communication liner notes.

- Sean Byrne – lead vocals, instruments
- Mark Hansen – organ (A4)
- Janet Weiss – guitar (B5)

== Release history ==
Region	Date	Label	Format	Catalog
United States	2009	Digitalis	LP	digiv013
