= Communicate (magazine) =

UK magazine

- Editor: Rebecca Pardon
- Frequency: Monthly
- Format: Trade magazine
- Founded: 2008
- Company: Cravenhill Publishing
- Country: UK
- Based in: London
- ISSN: 2046-4649

Communicate is a monthly trade magazine for the UK corporate communications community. Communicate covers corporate communications, public relations, investor relations, internal communications, corporate social responsibility, crisis communications and public affairs.

With a monthly circulation of 10,000, it is read by in-house communications departments in the private and public sectors as well as communications consultancies and service providers across the UK.

In addition to the magazine, Communicate publishes a weekly e-newsletter and hosts a website of the same name.

Communicate magazine is published by Andrew Thomas, and edited by Rebecca Pardon. It is owned by Cravenhill Publishing, an independent publishing company based in London.

== Columnists and contributors ==
Columnists and contributors have included:

- Vikki Chowney, editor of Reputation Online
- Caroline Parry, former news editor of Marketing Week
- Rebecca Richmond, content director for internal communications training firm Melcrum Publishing
- Ruth Sunderland, associate city editor of Daily Mail

Each issue features a profile of a key figure in corporate communications. These have included: Jane Wilson of the Chartered Institute of Public Relations, Andraea Dawson-Shepherd of Reckitt Benckiser and Simon Lewis when he was head of comms at 10 Downing Street.

== Events division ==
Communicate organise a number of awards events and conferences on key areas of corporate communications.

Their awards events include:

- The Digital Impact Awards, for digital corporate communications.
- The Transform Awards, for rebranding, repositioning and corporate transformation
- The Corporate Engagement Awards, for corporate partnerships and sponsorship

Their conferences include:

- Social Media in a Corporate Context (held in London, Manchester and Amsterdam)
- Transform - the annual conference for rebranding
- Reputation in Financial Services
- Reputation in Oil, Gas and Mining
