= Journal of Communications =

- Discipline: Engineering
- Language: English

Publication details
- History: 2006–present
- Publisher: Engineering and Technology Publishing
- Frequency: Monthly
- Open access: yes

Standard abbreviations
- ISO 4: J. Commun. (Oulu)

Indexing
- ISSN: 1796-2021
- OCLC no.: 85793987

Links
- Journal homepage

Journal of Communications is a scholarly peer-reviewed scientific journal published monthly, focusing on theories, systems, methods, algorithms, and applications in communications. It was initially published by Academy Publisher, based in Oulu, Finland, but since 2013 has been published by Engineering and Technology Publishing (ETP), of San Jose, California. ETP was listed on Beall's list before it was taken down in 2017.

The journal is indexed by Scopus, INSPEC, and Communication Abstracts.
