= American Gong =

Studio album by Quasi
- Released: February 23, 2010
- Genre: Indie rock
- Length: 41:47
- Label: Kill Rock Stars (US); Domino (UK)

Quasi chronology
Quasi Self Boot 93–96 (2006)	American Gong (2010)	Mole City (2013)

Professional ratings
Aggregate scores
Source	Rating
Metacritic	71/100
Review scores
Source	Rating
AllMusic	3.5/5 stars
The A.V. Club	B−
The Boston Phoenix	3.5/4 stars
MSN Music	A−
musicOMH	2/4 stars
NME	6/10
Pitchfork	7.2/10
PopMatters	3/10
Spin	7/10

American Gong is the eighth studio album by Portland based indie rock band Quasi. It was released on February 23, 2010, on the labels Kill Rock Stars (US) Domino Records (UK). The deluxe 2-CD version of the album features a compilation disc of songs previously released by Quasi, entitled So Far So Good: A Quasi Anthology.

== Track listing ==
No.	Title	Length
1.	"Repulsion"	4:22
2.	"Little White Horse"	4:32
3.	"Everything & Nothing at All"	4:34
4.	"Bye Bye Blackbird"	6:35
5.	"The Jig Is Up"	2:31
6.	"Black Dogs & Bubbles"	4:53
7.	"Death Is Not the End"	2:34
8.	"Rockabilly Party"	3:45
9.	"Now What"	2:27
10.	"Laissez Les Bon Temps Rouler"	4:53
11.	"Howler"	0:41
Total length:		41:47

=== So Far So Good: A Quasi Anthology track listing ===
#	Song title	Time	Year	Original release
1.	"R&B Transmogrification"	2:29	1997	R&B Transmogrification
2.	"Our Happiness is Guaranteed"	3:15	1998	Featuring "Birds"
3.	"Sunshine Sounds"	7:11	2003	Hot Shit
4.	"Alice the Goon"	4:16	2006	When the Going Gets Dark
5.	"All the Same"	4:05	1999	Field Studies
6.	"It's Hard to Turn Me On"	4:33	1998	Featuring "Birds"
7.	"The Sword of God"	4:55	2001	The Sword of God
8.	"A Case of No Way Out"	4:12	2001	The Sword of God
9.	"Sea Shanty"	4:08	1998	Featuring "Birds"
10.	"Mama Tried"	3:42	2003	Hot Shit
11.	"Invisible Star"	5:06	2006	When the Going Gets Dark
12.	"The Poisoned Well"	2:08	1998	Featuring "Birds"
13.	"Nothing, Nowhere"	3:13	2001	The Sword of God

== Personnel ==
- Sam Coomes – vocals, keyboards, guitar, producer
- Janet Weiss – drums, background vocals, producer
- Joanna Bolme – bass, producer
- Steve Fisk – mixing
- Dave Fridmann – mixing
- Johanna Jackson – artwork
- Chris Johanson – artwork
- Tucker Martine – mixing
- Roger Seibel – mastering
- Kendra Wright – recording engineer
