= Joanna Bolme =

American multi-instrumentalist (born 1968)

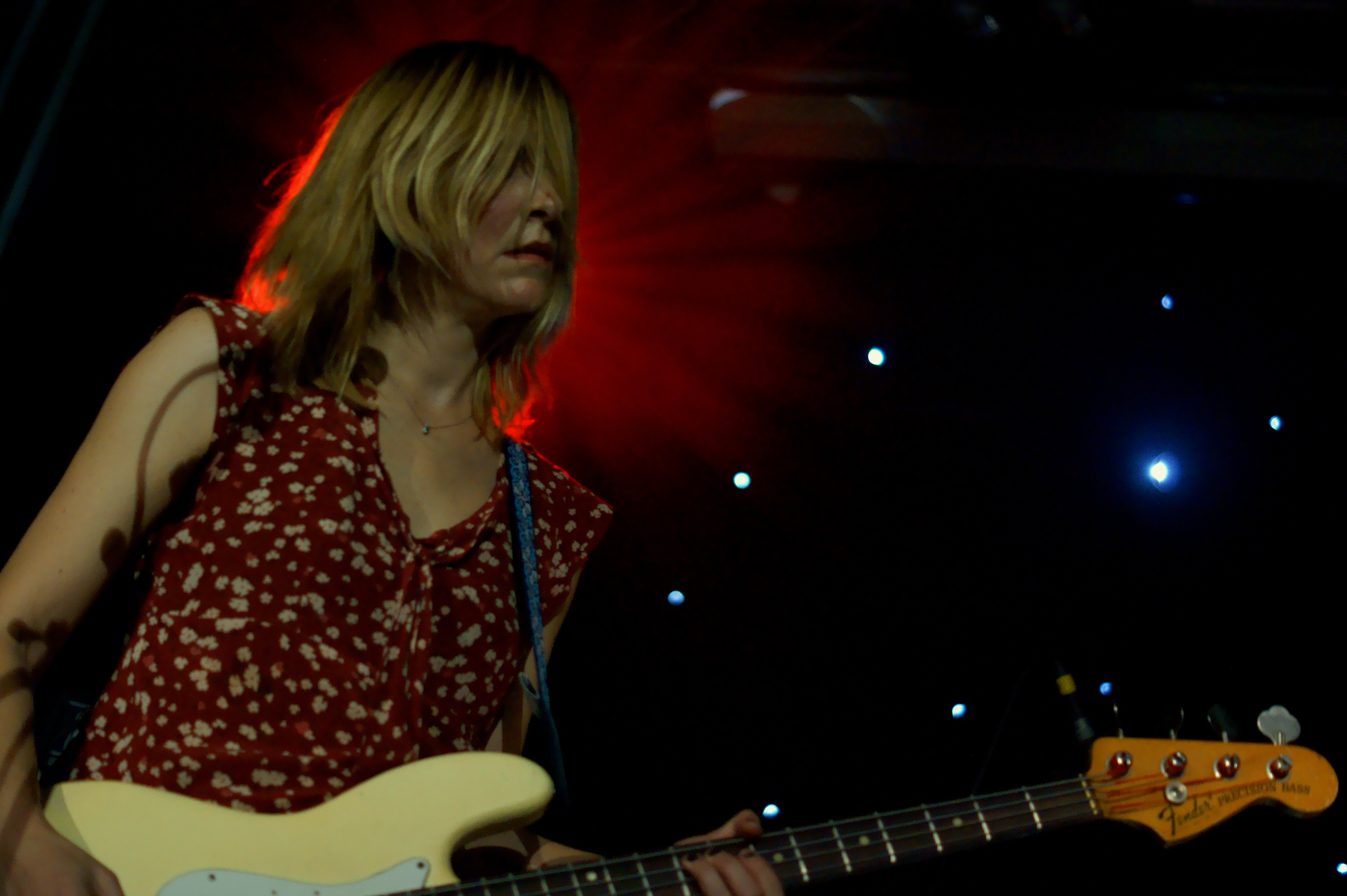
- Bolme performing with Stephen Malkmus and the Jicks in 2011

Background information
- Born: April 1, 1968 (age 58); Florida, U.S.
- Genres: Indie rock
- Occupation: Musician
- Instrument: Bass guitar
- Spouse: Gary Jarman

Joanna Bolme (born April 1, 1968) is an American multi-instrumentalist (primarily bass guitar) and recording engineer who works with several indie rock bands and artists, mainly in the Pacific Northwest. She has been the bass guitarist for Stephen Malkmus and the Jicks since their formation in 2001. On October 12, 2019, Bolme was inducted into the Oregon Music Hall of Fame.

== Biography ==
=== Career ===
Bolme became interested in playing music after seeing the Pretenders while in high school, and she was a fan of the Portland punk scene in the 80s. She learned to play bass when she "got bored with guitar" while playing with Calamity Jane. Over the years, she has played in bands including Quasi, the Minders, the Spinanes, Jr. High, Calamity Jane, Consortium, the Shadow Mortons, and Stephen Malkmus and the Jicks.

Bolme was a long-time friend (and former girlfriend) of musician Elliott Smith; she worked to mix his critically acclaimed 1997 album Either/Or and his posthumous 2004 album From a Basement on the Hill, with the help of producer Rob Schnapf.

Bolme became one of the founding members of the Jicks after finding out – during a game of Scrabble with Stephen Malkmus – that he had been playing music with John Moen. She has been the bass player for the Jicks since it began in 2000. She also began touring with the indie rock band (and long-time duo) Quasi in 2006, and was an official member of the band from 2007 to 2011.

=== Personal life ===
Bolme was born in Florida. She moved to Portland, Oregon, early in her life and has lived there since. She is married to Gary Jarman of the Cribs.

== Discography ==
=== As performer ===
- Arches and Aisles by the Spinanes;- bass (1998)
- Killer of Friendships by Jr. High – bass (1997)
- Golden Street by the Minders – bass (2001)
- Stephen Malkmus by Stephen Malkmus and the Jicks – bass (2001)
- From Burnt Orange to Midnight Blue by Sean Croghan – piano (2001)
- Pig Lib by Stephen Malkmus and the Jicks – bass (2003)
- Face the Truth by Stephen Malkmus – bass (2005)
- Real Emotional Trash by Stephen Malkmus and the Jicks – synthesizer, bass, backing vocals (2008)
- American Gong by Quasi – bass (2010)
- Mirror Traffic by Stephen Malkmus and the Jicks – bass (2011)
- Wig Out at Jagbags by Stephen Malkmus and the Jicks – bass (2014)
- Sparkle Hard by Stephen Malkmus and the Jicks – bass (2018)

=== As mixer or engineer ===
- Either/Or by Elliott Smith – mixing (1997)
- Featuring "Birds" by Quasi – executive producer (1998)
- Bella Neurox by Miss Murgatroid & Petra Haden – mixing (1999)
- Live at the Safari Club by the Chimps – engineer (1999)
- Lost Son by Richmond Fontaine – engineer (1999)
- No Memory by No. 2 – engineer (1999)
- Old Man Motel by Fernando – engineer (1999)
- Colonel Jeffery Pumpernickel: A Concept Album by various artists – engineer (2001)
- What Does Good Luck Bring? by No. 2 – engineer (2002)
- Winnemucca by Richmond Fontaine – engineer (2002)
- From a Basement on the Hill by Elliott Smith – mixing (2004)
- It's a Bright Guilty World by the Minders – mixing (2006)
- To Elliott, From Portland by Various Artists – engineer, mixing (2006)
