= No. 2 (band) =

American rock band

- Origin: Portland, Oregon, United States
- Genres: Indie rock, alternative rock
- Years active: 1996–2003, 2018–present
- Past members: Neil Gust; Gilly Ann Hanner; Jim Talstra; Paul Pulvirenti

No. 2 is an American indie rock band that originated in Portland, Oregon in 1996 and consisting of Neil Gust (guitar and vocals), Gilly Ann Hanner (bass, backing vocals; later to be replaced by Jim Talstra) and Paul Pulvirenti (drums).

== History ==
No. 2 was formed by frontman Neil Gust after the breakup of Heatmiser. The band's name is a reference to the fact that this was Neil Gust's second band with Virgin Records:

At the time, this was the second thing for Virgin and so I wrote No. 2 on it, and I just liked the way it looked. My second band; that's it.

The band quickly picked up where Heatmiser left off, with songs on their debut album No Memory that echoed the sound and feel of Mic City Sons. No Memory quickly earned the band praise for its melodic hooks and finely crafted songs. No. 2 began small, with Neil Gust asking a few friends to help record some material for a new album.

The band's first release, a 7" vinyl called "Allistair Chestnut", was released in mid-1999. The A-side, titled "Allistair Chestnut", is a song about falling for someone who is more interested in 'playing the field' than a relationship. The band's first full album, No Memory, was released within months of the "Allistair Chestnut" 7". A full tour followed, mostly opening for former bandmate Sam Coomes's band Quasi. A second album, What Does Good Luck Bring? followed in 2002.

In April 2007, a studio recorded demo was leaked by Neil Gust of a No. 2 song recorded in 2003. The song, titled "Who's Behind the Door", features former bandmate Elliott Smith on guitar and keyboards, and John Moen (currently of The Decemberists) on drums. According to Gust:

It was recorded in Elliott [Smith]'s studio in LA. It was a surreal experience. Long story. Elliott came to our last show in LA and wanted to record, so we schlepped our gear over there, recorded the basics the next day and I hung around for 2 weeks trying to finish 1 song with him. He wasn't very healthy, but he was trying. It was the last time I saw him. I left before we finished mixing it. His girlfriend [Jennifer Chiba] gave me the mix about 8 months later at his 'funeral'.

On May 14, 2020, No. 2 released their first music in 18 years, "You Might Be Right", as a digital A-side. "You Might Be Right" b/w "French Exit" was produced by Joanna Bolme (Stephen Malkmus and the Jicks) and recorded by Gary Jarman (The Cribs); the single was released as a physical 7" on Jealous Butcher Records on June 12, 2020. A new album, First Love, was released on September 9, 2022.

== Discography ==
Studio albums

- No Memory (1999, Chainsaw Records; 2015, Jackpot Records [limited-edition LP reissue])
- What Does Good Luck Bring? (2002, In Music We Trust)
- First Love (2022, Jealous Butcher Records)

Singles

- "Allistair Chestnut" b/w "Little Face" (1999, Wicked Witch Records)
- "You Might Be Right" b/w "French Exit" (2020, Jealous Butcher Records)
