= Mike Clark (indie rock musician) =

American musician and restaurateur

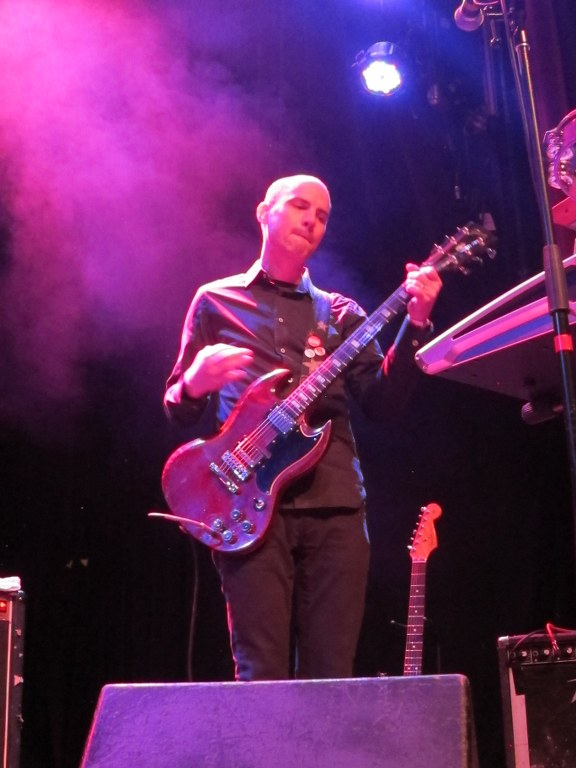
- Clark performing with Stephen Malkmus and the Jicks in 2014

Background information
- Born: Michael Edward Clark
- Origin: Portland, Oregon
- Genre: Indie rock
- Occupation: Musician
- Instruments: Keyboards, guitar, drums, bass

Mike Clark is an American musician and restaurateur based in Portland, Oregon. He currently plays keyboards and guitar for Stephen Malkmus and the Jicks.

== Musical career ==
Clark has performed with a number of bands in the Portland area. During the late 1990s and early 2000s (decade) he played drums with the Surf Maggots, guitar with the Underpants Machine and the No-No's, and keyboards with the Maroons. Since 2001, he has recorded and toured extensively with Stephen Malkmus and the Jicks.

He is currently the touring bass player for The Corin Tucker Band and can be seen in their video for "Riley."

== Sassiest Boy in America ==
Clark was featured in the October 1991 issue of Sassy magazine as the "Sassiest Boy in America," a title previously held by Ian Svenonius.

== Sagittarius ==
In 2005, Clark and his wife Robin opened Sagittarius, an "eclectic and inexpensive comfort-food joint" located in the Overlook neighborhood of Portland, Oregon.

== Album appearances ==
- The Surf Maggots – Are You There, God? It's Me, Maggot (1995, Candy-Ass)
- The No-No's – Secret Luminaries (1999, Chromosome)
- The No-No's – Tinnitus (2000, Animal World)
- The No-No's – Let Your Shadow Out (2002, Animal World)
- The Maroons – You're Gonna Ruin Everything (2002, In Music We Trust)
- Stephen Malkmus and the Jicks – Pig Lib (2003, Matador)
- Stephen Malkmus and the Jicks – Face the Truth (2005, Matador)
- Stephen Malkmus and the Jicks – Real Emotional Trash (2008, Matador)
- Stephen Malkmus and the Jicks – Mirror Traffic (2011, Matador)
- Stephen Malkmus and the Jicks - Wig Out at Jagbags (2014, Matador)
- The Cribs - Night Network (2020, Sonic Blew)
