= Groove Denied =

2019 album by Stephen Malkmus

Studio album by Stephen Malkmus
- Released: March 15, 2019
- Genre: Electronic
- Length: 33:20
- Labels: Matador; Domino
- Producer: Stephen Malkmus

Stephen Malkmus chronology
Face the Truth (2005)	Groove Denied (2019)	Traditional Techniques (2020)

Singles from Groove Denied
- 1. "Viktor Borgia" Released: January 22, 2019; 2. "Rushing the Acid Frat" Released: February 20, 2019; 3. "Come Get Me" Released: March 6, 2019

Professional ratings
Aggregate scores
Source	Rating
Metacritic	77/100
Review scores
Source	Rating
AllMusic	3.5/5 stars
Consequence of Sound	B+
Exclaim!	7/10
Pitchfork	7.2/10
Tom Hull	B+

Groove Denied is a studio album by American rock musician Stephen Malkmus. It is the third album credited to Malkmus and the first to not feature his band The Jicks. It was released on March 15, 2019 by Matador Records and Domino Recording Company.

== Background ==
Malkmus had been working on the album for 12 to 13 years. After he submitted the album in 2017, Matador Records' president and founder Chris Lombardi, who has been releasing Malkmus' records since Pavement's 1992 debut album Slanted and Enchanted, flew personally to Portland to inform Malkmus that it wasn't the right time to release the album. The album features Malkmus on all instruments and production and engineering.

== Release and promotion ==
In an interview with the Chicago Tribune, Malkmus revealed that Groove Denied would be released in March 2019.

Matador teased the album on January 21, 2019. The album was officially announced the next day with the single "Viktor Borgia" (which was likened to OMD and The Human League) and an accompanying music video. "Rushing the Acid Frat" was released on February 20, 2019. "Come Get Me" was released on March 6, 2019.

== Track listing ==
All tracks are written by Stephen Malkmus.

No.	Title	Length
1.	"Belziger Faceplant"	4:24
2.	"A Bit Wilder"	3:15
3.	"Viktor Borgia"	3:33
4.	"Come Get Me"	2:29
5.	"Forget Your Place"	3:33
6.	"Rushing the Acid Frat"	2:27
7.	"Love the Door"	3:09
8.	"Boss Viscerate"	2:40
9.	"Ocean of Revenge"	3:30
10.	"Grown Nothing"	4:20
Total length:		33:20

== Personnel ==
- Stephen Malkmus – all instruments, production, engineering, bass, organ, drum machines, Roland 2080, Memorymoog

== Charts ==
Chart (2019)	Peak position
Scottish Albums (Official Charts)	58
