= Early Recordings (Quasi album) =

Compilation album by Quasi
- Released: March 29, 1996
- Genre: Indie rock; lo-fi
- Length: 54:16
- Label: Key Op; Touch and Go
- Producer: Quasi

Quasi chronology
Quasi (1993)	Early Recordings (1996)	R&B Transmogrification (1997)

Early Recordings is a compilation album by the American indie band Quasi. It was released on March 29, 1996, on Key Op Records, and re-released on August 21, 2001, on Touch and Go Records. It includes songs previously released on the band's self-titled, self-released cassette, as well as previously unreleased recordings. Quasi produced and mixed the album themselves, with mastering done by Tony Lash.

== Background and recording ==
Before Quasi was formed, member Sam Coomes convinces a friend to buy him a home 8-track, as they were both in the band Donner Party at the time. Years later, when his friend had left music altogether, Quasi purchased the 8-track back from him, as well as multiple other pieces of equipment to use for recording at home.

In an interview with Tape Op, Quasi stated that they had used a Sonic Maximizer when mixing the snares on Early Recordings, using its delay effect as a substitute for reverb. According to Coomes, "The drums were fucked on that record [Early Recordings], 'cause we recorded on the fly and didn't pay much attention to the sound. I used distortion boxes on the drums. I just did all kinds of fucked up things to make it sound interesting."

== Critical reception ==
Professional ratings
Review scores
Source	Rating
AllMusic	link
Pitchfork Media	link

Reviewing the 2001 reissue, Margaret Schwartz of PopMatters saw the album as "a window into the creative process", but does not suffer from the "pitfalls" that compilation albums of its type fall into. Schwartz described the mood of Early Recordings as "morose", praising how Weiss' voice complimented the album's tracks. She ends her review by stating that even though the album is guaranteed to be received well by fans, "I think it’s worthwhile even for the more casual listener: it is unique and compelling music, all the more so because it is so intimate, so immediate." AllMusic's Nitsuh Abebe described the sound of Early Recordings as "firmly on the American side of the '60s pop map, using a tight combination of drums, guitars and primitive synths along with production that strictly avoids the smoothed-over density of most contemporary recordings." He referred to the album's sound as "excellent", with its songwriting "brilliant enough to make it worthwhile". In a more mixed review, Pitchfork writer Matt LeMay described Early Recordings as "all over the place", opining that its "small hints" of the band's future sound is "often lost in general messiness." Though he concedes that the album has "certainly a few excellent moments", "they only reveal themselves to people who are willing to wade through 19 severely spotty tracks."

== Track listing ==
All tracks are written by Sam Coomes, except where noted. Track listing is adapted from the album's Bandcamp page.

No.	Title	Writer(s)	Length
1.	"Two Hounds"		2:41
2.	"Superficial"		3:27
3.	"Birds Are Bells"	Janet Weiss	1:56
4.	Untitled	Coomes; Weiss	3:08
5.	"Time Flies By"	Coomes; Weiss	2:26
6.	"Gaping Holes"		3:08
7.	"Hui Neng"		2:28
8.	"Homunculus"		3:50
9.	"Monkey, Mirror"	Coomes; Weiss	3:52
10.	"Hairs"	Coomes; Weiss	1:04
11.	"The Egg"		3:37
12.	"Rumpy"		2:11
13.	"Digital Delay"	Weiss	2:09
14.	"Mammon"		2:55
15.	"Reverse Coagulation"		0:54
16.	"Op. 7"	Coomes; Weiss	1:29
17.	"Pay Me Now, or Pay Me Late"		3:45
18.	"Unspeakable Thing"	Weiss	4:07
19.	"Deep Sleep"		5:08
Total length:			54:16

== Credits and personnel ==
Credits adapted from multiple sources.

- Sam Coomes – vocals, guitars, Rocksichord, keyboards, mixing, engineering
- Janet Weiss – vocals, drums, mixing, engineering
- Tony Lash – mastering
