= Calamity Jane (grunge band) =

American rock band

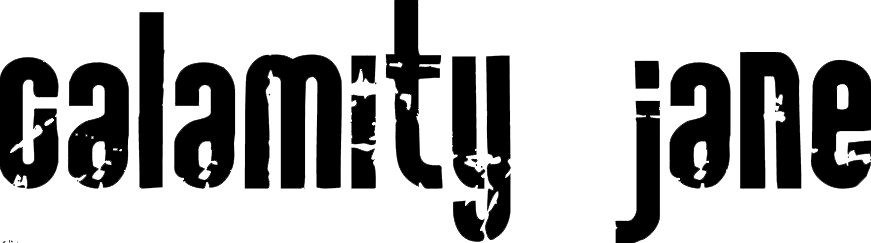

Background information
- Origin: Portland, Oregon, United States
- Genres: Grunge; punk rock; riot grrrl
- Years active: 1989–1992, 2010, 2016
- Past members: Gilly Ann Hanner; Lisa Koenig; Ronna Era; Megan Hanner; Joanna Bolme

Calamity Jane was an American rock band, formed in Portland, Oregon, United States, in 1989.

== History ==
Gilly Ann Hanner (vocals/guitar) and Lisa Koenig (drums) started playing together as a band in 1988 along with Ronna Era (bass). After a few live appearances Hanner's sister Megan took over on bass and the band was renamed Calamity Jane the following year. Their first gig was supporting Scrawl. The band then supported Fugazi on their 1990 tour.

The band released their first album on 12", Martha Jane Cannary, in 1991. At the time it received positive critical reception in the specialist music press, including a review in Maximum Rocknroll that highlighted the "driving rock riffage". Calamity Jane released three singles with their original line up, and a final single with Marcéo Martinez (later of Team Dresch) on drums and Joanna Bolme (later of Quasi and The Jicks) on bass.

The band played two support slots with Nirvana. One of these shows, in Buenos Aires, Argentina, ended in Calamity Jane being booed off and thrown mud and rocks by the crowd, which motivated Nirvana to intentionally sabotage their own performance.

In 2014 a grunge retrospective album, No Seattle: Forgotten Sounds of the North-West Grunge Era 1986-97, which included the song "Magdalena", was released. A review in the City Arts Magazine highlighted the groups significance as "riot grrrl pioneers" and lamented their demise. In 2011 they were named as one of the "best proponents of Grunge" in an article published by the Journal of Popular Culture, and in 2022 Will Russell, writing in music magazine Hot Press, named Calamity Jane as one of Grunge music's "sublime all-female outfits".

== Line-up ==
- Gilly Ann Hanner (vocals, guitar)
- Megan Hanner (bass)
- Lisa Koenig (drums)
- Marcéo Martinez (drums) 1992
- Joanna Bolme (bass, guitar) 1992

== Discography ==
- "Hang Up" / "You Got It Rough" / "Outta Money", Brimstone Productions, 7", 1990
- "Say It" / "Little Girl", Imp Records, 7", 1991
- "My Spit" / "Miss Hell", SRI, 7", 1991
- Martha Jane Cannary, SMR Records, Jealous Butcher, LP/CD, 1991
- "Love Song" / "Believe", Tim/Kerr Records, 7", 1992
