= Traditional Techniques =

Studio album by Stephen Malkmus
- Released: March 6, 2020
- Genre: Folk rock; psychedelic rock
- Length: 41:05
- Label: Matador; Domino
- Producer: Chris Funk

Stephen Malkmus chronology
Groove Denied (2019)	Traditional Techniques (2020)

Traditional Techniques is a solo album by American musician Stephen Malkmus, the fourth album credited to Malkmus and the second to not feature his band the Jicks. It is the ninth project in Malkmus's career since Pavement disbanded, and the fourteenth album released in his career. It was released on March 6, 2020, by Matador Records and Domino Recording Company.

== Background and recording ==
Malkmus conceived the idea for Traditional Techniques during the recording of Sparkle Hard. According to a press release, the concept gained traction and became a fully realized album in a matter of weeks. Recording of the album took place in Portland, Oregon, at Halfling Studio. The album was produced by Chris Funk of The Decemberists and features guitarist Matt Sweeney and musician Qais Essar.

== Critical reception ==
Professional ratings
Aggregate scores
Source	Rating
AnyDecentMusic?	7.5/10
Metacritic	80/100
Review scores
Source	Rating
AllMusic	4.5/5 stars
American Songwriter	4/5 stars
DIY	3.5/5 stars
Loud and Quiet	8/10
NME	3/5 stars
Pitchfork	7.7/10
PopMatters	7/10 stars
The Skinny	4/5 stars
Slant Magazine	4/5 stars
Spectrum Culture	3.25/5 stars

Traditional Techniques received positive reviews from music critics. Many critics praised Malkmus' foray into folk music. At Metacritic, which assigns a normalized rating out of 100 to reviews from mainstream publications, the album received an average score of 80, based on eighteen reviews, indicating "generally favorable" reviews.

Writing for Loud and Quiet, Sam Walton gave the album a positive review, praising it as "an expertly written and performed exploration of muted psych-rock and various strands of folk music".

Robert Christgau gave the album a two-star honorable mention in his "Consumer Guide" column, highlighting the songs "Xian Man" and "Cash Up" while writing in summation: "It’s more than cool, as it had better be, that he’s matured from willfully acerbic to willingly pretty, but he’s too smart not to know in the heart he’s proud to have that while acerbic feeds on chaos, pretty is better off explaining itself".

== Track listing ==
All tracks are written by Stephen Malkmus.

Traditional Techniques track listing
No.	Title	Length
1.	"ACC Kirtan"	6:19
2.	"Xian Man"	4:07
3.	"The Greatest Own In Legal History"	3:48
4.	"Cash Up"	4:07
5.	"Shadowbanned"	3:23
6.	"What Kind Of Person"	3:28
7.	"Flowin' Robes"	2:52
8.	"Brainwashed"	4:59
9.	"Signal Western"	3:46
10.	"Amberjack"	4:16
Total length:		41:05

Traditional Techniques – Japanese edition (bonus track)
No.	Title	Length
11.	"Juliefuckingette"	3:02
Total length:		44:07

== Credits ==
- Stephen Malkmus – composer, lead vocals, guitar, bass
- Chris Funk – autoharp, dobro, Moog synthesizer, pedal steel, weissenborn, producer
- Blake Mills – guitar
- Bill Athens – bass
- Qais Essar – rabab
- Eric Zang – daf, kaval, udu
- Matt Sweeney – electric guitar, acoustic guitar, vocals
- Spooner Oldham – wurlitzer
- Joy Pearson – vocals
- Dan Hunt – drums, percussion

=== Additional credits ===
- Sharmila Banerjee – illustrations
- Jan Lankisch – design
- Adam Lee – mixing
- Jeff Lipton – mastering
- Maria Rice – mastering
- Jason Quigley – photography
