= Stephen Malkmus =

American musician (born 1966)

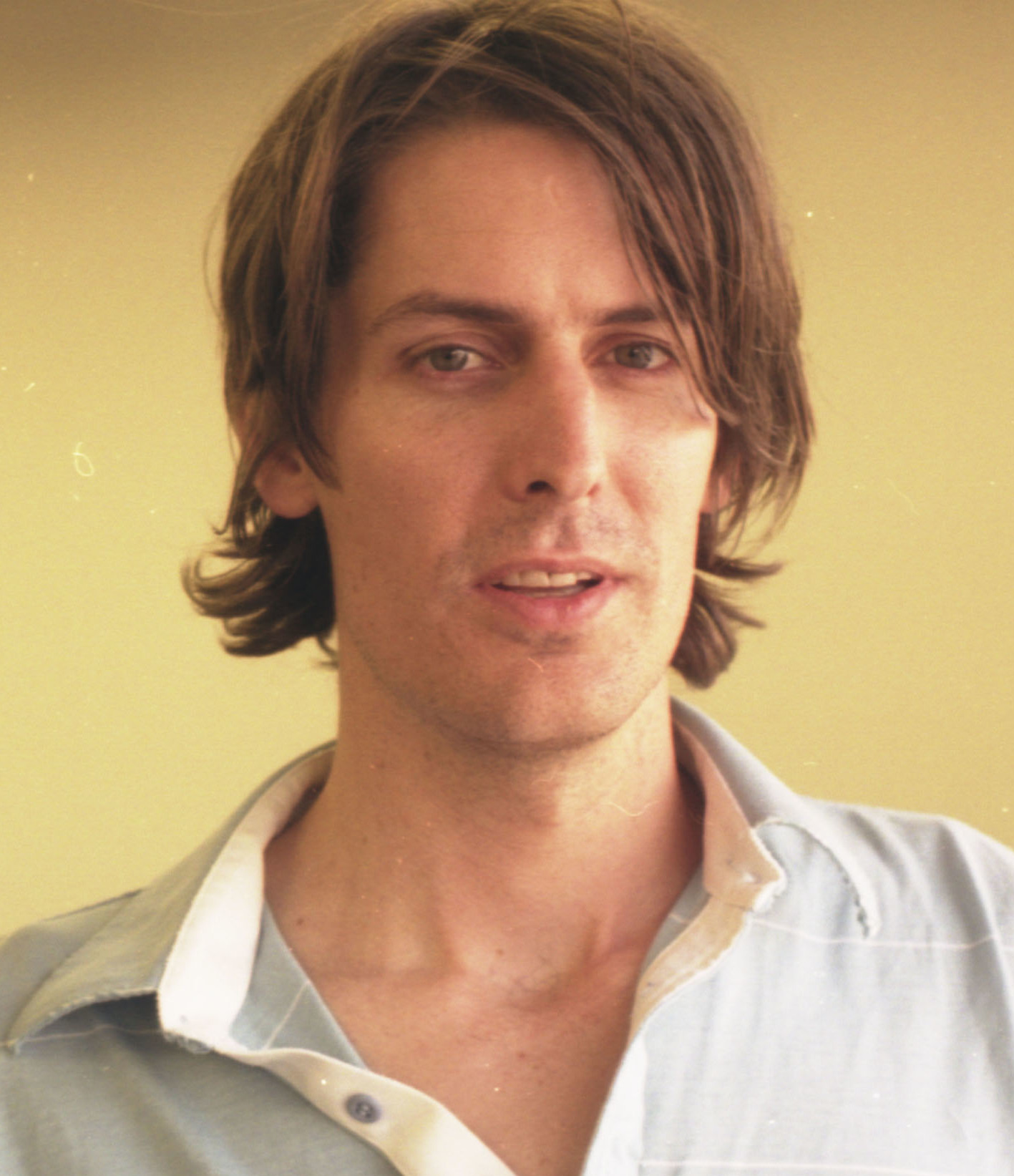
- Malkmus in 2006

Background information
- Also known as: SM; Hazel Figurine
- Born: Stephen Malkmus; May 30, 1966 (age 60); Santa Monica, California, U.S.
- Origin: Stockton, California
- Genre: Indie rock
- Instruments: Vocals; guitar; bass; drums
- Years active: 1982–present
- Labels: Matador; Domino; Drag City
- Member of: Pavement; Stephen Malkmus & The Jicks; The Hard Quartet
- Formerly of: Silver Jews; Ectoslavia; The Crust Brothers
- Website: stephenmalkmus.com

Stephen Joseph Malkmus (/ˈmælkmɪs/ MALK-miss; born May 30, 1966) is an American musician best known as the primary songwriter, lead singer and guitarist of the indie rock band Pavement. Beginning as a duo, Pavement eventually grew to a quintet. The band released five studio albums before breaking up in 1999.

Both during and after his time in Pavement, Malkmus took part in several side projects but, notably contributing guitar on three albums with Silver Jews. Following Pavement's break-up, Malkmus embarked on a solo career, primarily with backing band the Jicks. He currently performs with Stephen Malkmus and the Jicks, Pavement, The Hard Quartet, and as a solo artist.

== Biography ==
=== Early years ===
Malkmus was born on May 30, 1966, in Santa Monica, California, to Mary and Stephen Malkmus Sr. His father was a property and casualty insurance agent. When Stephen Jr. was 8, the family moved north to Stockton, at which point he attended Carpinteria's Cate School and Lodi's Tokay High School. As a teenager, Malkmus worked various jobs, including painting house numbers on street curbs and "flipping burgers or whatever" at a country club. At age 16, he spent the night in jail after consuming alcohol, urinating in the bushes, and walking on the roofs of several residential homes. Later, he was placed on probation for underage drinking, and was also expelled from school "for going to a party in the woods where people were taking mushrooms. I didn't take them, but some guy narc'd on me."

Malkmus learned the guitar by playing along to Jimi Hendrix's "Purple Haze". Around the age of 16, he started playing in several Stockton-based punk bands: Bag O Bones, The Straw Dogs, and Crisis Alert. After graduating from high school, Malkmus followed in his father's footsteps by attending the University of Virginia, where he majored in history and was a disc jockey for the college radio station WTJU. During this time, Malkmus met fellow WTJU DJs David Berman (who would later front the Silver Jews) and James McNew (of Yo La Tengo) and formed the lo-fi band Ectoslavia. In the late 1980s, he was employed as a security guard at the Whitney Museum of American Art in New York City, along with Berman and Bob Nastanovich.

=== Career ===
==== Pavement ====
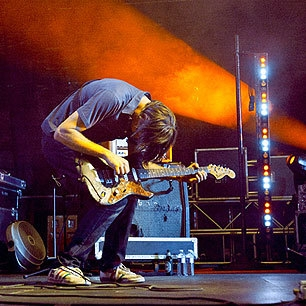
Malkmus performing with Pavement in 2010

Malkmus formed Pavement with Scott Kannberg (aka Spiral Stairs) right after finishing college at UVA in the late 80s. Their first album, Slanted & Enchanted, was released to critical acclaim, and the band continued to receive attention for subsequent releases. Pavement, and Malkmus in particular, were hailed as spearheading the underground indie movement of the 1990s.

Pavement reunited in 2010 and embarked on a world tour, and reunited again in 2022 and 2023 for another tour.

==== Solo work and The Jicks ====
In 2001, following the 1999 dissolution of Pavement, Malkmus released his first self-titled album with his new band, The Jicks (although they were uncredited, except as printed on the original CD label).

Malkmus's fourth studio album with The Jicks, Real Emotional Trash, was released in March 2008.

In August 2011, he released his fifth studio album with the Jicks, Mirror Traffic. He played the album Ege Bamyasi, originally by the band Can, in its entirety on December 1, 2012, at WEEK-END Festival in Cologne, Germany. A recording of this performance was released as a limited-edition live album on Record Store Day 2013.

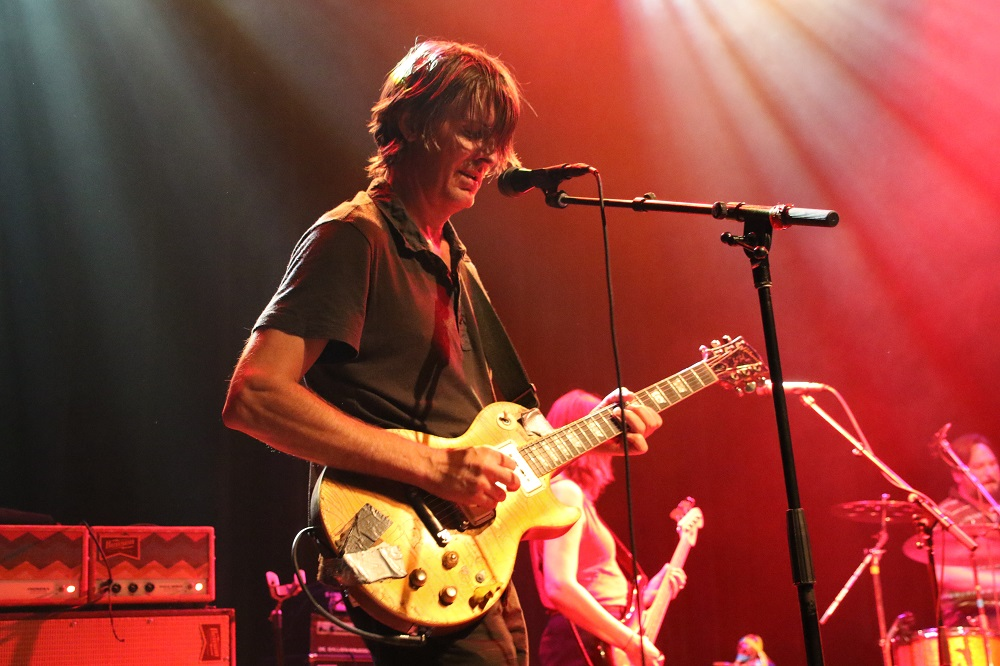
Malkmus performing with the Jicks in 2018

Malkmus's sixth studio album with the Jicks, Wig Out at Jagbags, was released on January 7, 2014. On February 7, 2018, Stephen Malkmus and the Jicks released "Middle America", their first material in four years. It was their first single from their seventh studio album, Sparkle Hard, which was released on May 18, 2018.

Malkmus released an electronic album titled Groove Denied on March 15, 2019, after having worked on the album for 12 to 13 years. After he submitted the album in 2017, Chris Lombardi of Matador Records, which had released all of Malkmus' records thus far, told Malkmus that it was not the right time to release the album. The album features Malkmus on all instruments and production and engineering. Malkmus released Traditional Techniques on March 6, 2020. The album was produced by Chris Funk of The Decemberists and features guitarist Matt Sweeney and musician Qais Essar.

==== Side projects ====
Malkmus was a member of rock group Silver Jews along with David Berman. In early 1999, Malkmus participated in a Sonic Youth side project called Kim's Bedroom that included bassist/vocalist Kim Gordon, guitarist and vocalist Thurston Moore, Jim O'Rourke, and drummer Ikue Mori; they never released an album, but did play a few live shows. By 2001, Malkmus was performing as frontman of The Jicks.

In 2007, Malkmus provided 3 songs to the Todd Haynes' film I'm Not There, based on the life of Bob Dylan. He contributed on the songs "Ballad of a Thin Man", "Can't Leave Her Behind", and "Maggie's Farm". Malkmus has admitted that he was never "a really big fan of Dylan," but noted that his involvement with the film had made him listen "to him again a little closer."

In 2016, Malkmus scored the soundtrack to the Netflix series Flaked, which stars Will Arnett.

In 2024, Malkmus started the band The Hard Quartet with Emmett Kelly, Matt Sweeney, and Jim White.

== Artistry ==
Malkmus' lyrics are said to incorporate a "stream of consciousness style," and have drawn comparisons to those of The Fall vocalist Mark E. Smith. Jim Keoghan of The Quietus assessed, "Like Smith, Malkmus excels at a stream of consciousness lyrical style, one that baffles and entertains in equal measure."

== Personal life ==
Malkmus moved to Portland, Oregon, where he met his wife, artist Jessica Jackson Hutchins. The couple have two children: daughters Lottie (born 2004) and Sunday (born 2007). In 2011, before the release of Mirror Traffic, Malkmus and his family moved to Berlin. By the release of Wig Out at Jagbags in 2014, however, the family had moved back to Portland. In July 2024, Malkmus moved to Chicago, his wife's hometown.

Malkmus is a sports fan, including of UK soccer team Hull City, and is known to play tennis and golf. He also played second base for the Portland-based Disjecta softball team. Malkmus also previously played lacrosse in his high school.

Malkmus described himself as autistic.

== Equipment ==
Malkmus currently plays a Fender Stratocaster and a Guild S-100.

== Discography ==
=== With Pavement ===
- Slanted and Enchanted (1992)
- Crooked Rain, Crooked Rain (1994)
- Wowee Zowee (1995)
- Brighten the Corners (1997)
- Terror Twilight (1999)

=== With Silver Jews ===
Singles and EPs

- Dime Map of the Reef (1992 – 7"ep)
- The Sabellion Rebellion & Old New York (1993 – 7")
- The Arizona Record (1993 – 12")
- Hot as Hell – Live 1993 (1999 – 7" Single)

Albums

- Starlite Walker (1994)
- American Water (1998)
- Tanglewood Numbers (2005)

=== With The Crust Brothers ===
- Marquee Mark (1998)

=== With The Jicks ===
Albums

- Stephen Malkmus (2001) (Note: Although the Jicks are not credited within the title, the album Stephen Malkmus is in fact a Jicks recording. Initially, Malkmus simply wanted to call his post-Pavement band the Jicks with no mention of his name, but Matador records resisted the idea and released the album as Stephen Malkmus, although the word "Jicks" is printed both on the CD itself, and on the inner sleeve of the vinyl pressing.)
- Pig Lib (2003)
- Face the Truth (2005) (Note: Similarly, while Face the Truth is technically Stephen Malkmus's only true solo affair, the Jicks do provide instrumentation on nearly every song, and "& The Jicks" is visible on the back of the album artwork.)
- Real Emotional Trash (2008)
- Mirror Traffic (2011)
- Wig Out at Jagbags (2014)
- Sparkle Hard (2018)

=== Solo albums ===
- Groove Denied (2019)
- Traditional Techniques (2020)

Singles

- "Discretion Grove" (2001) – w/ "Sin Taxi" and "Leisurely Poison" (2001)
- "Jenny & the Ess-Dog" (2001) – w/ "Keep the Faith", "That's What Mama Said" and "Alien Boy"
- Phantasies EP (2001) – w/ "Malay Massaker"
- "Jo Jo's Jacket" – w/ "Polish Mule", "The Hook (live)" and "Open and Shut Cases" (2001)
- "Sex Life of Robinson Crusoe, Pt. 2" (2001) – B-side available only on official site
- "Us" (2003)
- "Dark Wave" (2003) – w/ Pig Lib bonus disc B-sides
- "Post-Paint Boy" (2005)
- "Baby C'Mon" (2005) – w/ "Wow Ass Jeans"
- Kindling for the Master EP (2006) – w/ 4 remixes
- "Cold Son" 10" EP (2008) – w/ "Walk Into the Mirror", "Pennywhistle Thunder" and "Carl the Clod"
- "Gardenia" (2008) – w/ "Walk Into the Mirror"
- "Middle America" (2018)
- "Shiggy" (2018)
- "Refute" (2018)
- "Viktor Borgia" (2019)
- "Rushing the Acid Frat" (2019)
- "Come Get Me" (2019)

=== With The Hard Quartet ===
- The Hard Quartet (2024)

=== Compilations and collaborations ===
- SubUrbia Original Motion Picture Soundtrack (1997) – "Unheard Music" (with Elastica)
- At Home With the Groovebox (2000) – "Robyn Turns 26"
- All Tomorrow's Parties 1.1 (2002) – "Good Kids Eggs"
- Colonel Jeffrey Pumpernicklel (2002) – "Blue Rash Intact (Quarantined-Hallucinations Due To Severe Allergies)"
- Under the Influence – 21 years of Flying Nun Records (2002) – "Death and the Maiden"
- Matador At Fifteen (2004) – "It Kills (live)"
- This One's for the Fellows: A Sonic Salute to the Young Fresh Fellows (2004) – guitar on "No One Really Knows" (with The Maroons)
- Chokes! EP by Silkworm (2007) – guitar on "Spanish Harlem Incident (live)"
- I'm Not There (Music from the Motion Picture) (2007) – With [The Million Dollar Bashers]: "Ballad of a Thin Man" and "Maggie's Farm"; with Lee Ranaldo: "Can't Leave Her Behind" and "What Kind of Friend is This?" (iTunes only)
- Early Risers by Soldiers of Fortune (2015) – "Campus Swagger"
- Day of the Dead (2016) – "China Cat Sunflower -> I Know You Rider"
- Battle Hymns (2017) – "Midnight Cruisers" Digital Download
- Fiddle player in the 2019 film "First Cow"

=== Miscellaneous ===
- The New Yorker College Tour: University of Washington, Seattle: A Conversation with Stephen Malkmus (2006)

== Music videos ==
Year	Title	Director
2001	"Discretion Grove"	Grant Gee
2001	"Jenny & the Ess-Dog"	?
2001	"Jo Jo's Jacket"	Shynola
2003	"Death and the Maiden"	Mitchell Hawkes
2003	"Dark Wave"	Scott Lyons
2003	"Baby C'Mon"	Lana Kim & Andy Bruntel
2005	"Mama"	E.J. McLeavey-Fisher
2008	"Gardenia"	Daniel Woods
2011	"No One Is (As I Are Be)"	Steve Doughton
2011	"Senator"	Scott Jacobson
2013	"Lariat"	Michael Leblanc
2013	"Cinnamon and Lesbians"	Jay Winebrenner
2018	"Middle America" (acoustic)	Brook Linder
2018	"Solid Silk" (acoustic)	Brook Linder
2019	"Viktor Borgia"	Jan Lankisch
2019	"Rushing the Acid Frat"	Robert Strange & James Papper
2019	"Come Get Me" (lyric video)	Marisa Gesualdi
2020	"Xian Man" (lyric video)	Marisa Gesualdi
2020	"Shadowbanned"	Jan Lankisch

- Cover of "Death and the Maiden" by New Zealand band The Verlaines. Available on Flying Num DVD Very Short Films.
