= The Sword of God (album) =

Studio album by Quasi
- Released: August 21, 2001
- Recorded: Fluke Room, Portland, OR; The Devil's Workshop, Portland, OR
- Genre: Indie rock
- Length: 52:54
- Label: Touch & Go (U.S.); Domino (UK)
- Producer: Quasi

Quasi chronology
Field Studies (1999)	The Sword of God (2001)	Hot Shit! (2003)

Professional ratings
Aggregate scores
Source	Rating
Metacritic	70/100
Review scores
Source	Rating
Allmusic	4.0/5 stars
Pitchfork Media	6.0/10
NME	7/10

The Sword of God is the 2001 album by the Portland indie-rock duo Quasi, released on Touch and Go Records in the United States, and Domino Recording Company in the U.K.

== Critical reception ==
The Sword of God received mixed, but generally positive reviews. Thom Jurek of Allmusic lauded the improved musicianship, writing: "Weiss has become a stomping drummer, a poignant, ironically comedic lyricist, and a smart-assed vocalist, and Coomes has become a smoking guitar player and a proficient if not deft keyboardist."

Critics noted a marked change in sonic direction from their previous efforts, Featuring "Birds" and Field Studies, but had mixed reactions to the changes. Billboard (magazine) positively described the sound as "freewheeling" and "mangier, almost bar-band", while Pitchfork's Mat LeMay felt that "the efforts made by the band to expand their oeuvre on The Sword of God just fall flat." In contrast to those reviews, Keith Phipps of The A.V. Club criticized the lack of change: "Sword of God is fine, but it suffers from following two better albums, which it resembles too closely to avoid comparison."

== Track listing ==
All tracks by Sam Coomes except where noted.

1. "Introduction" – 0:51
2. "Fuck Hollywood" – 4:47
3. "It's Raining" – 3:10
4. "Genetic Science" – 3:21
5. "The Sword of God" – 4:55
6. "A Case of No Way Out" – 4:12
7. "The Curse of Having It All" (Janet Weiss) – 4:53
8. "Seal the Deal" (Coomes, Weiss) – 4:16
9. "From a Hole in the Ground" – 3:15
10. "Little Lord Fontleroy" – 3:34
11. "Goblins & Trolls" – 4:11
12. "Better Luck Next Time" – 3:59
13. "Nothing, Nowhere" – 3:13
14. "Rock & Roll Can Never Die" – 4:18

== Personnel ==
- Sam Coomes – vocals, guitars, Roxichord, keyboards, liner notes
- Janet Weiss – vocals, drums
- Quasi – production
- Stanley Zappa – saxophone on "Fuck Hollywood"
- Larry Crane – assisted production on "Fuck Hollywood," "The Sword of God," and "Seal the Deal"
- John Clark – back cover, photography
- Neil Gust – design assistant
- Roger Seibel – mastering
