= Real Emotional Trash =

Studio album by Stephen Malkmus and the Jicks
- Released: March 4, 2008 (U.S.)
- Recorded: April 2007 and June 2007 at SnowGhost Music in Whitefish, Montana and Foxtrot Studio in Chicago, Illinois.
- Genre: Indie rock
- Length: 55:05
- Labels: Matador Records (U.S.); Domino Records (UK)
- Producer: Stephen Malkmus

Stephen Malkmus and the Jicks chronology
Face the Truth (2005)	Real Emotional Trash (2008)	Mirror Traffic (2011)

Professional ratings
Aggregate scores
Source	Rating
Metacritic	76/100
Review scores
Source	Rating
AllMusic	4.5/5 stars
The A.V. Club	B+
Entertainment Weekly	B+
The Guardian	3/5 stars
Mojo	4/5 stars
The Observer	3/5 stars
Pitchfork	6.8/10
Rolling Stone	4.5/5 stars
Spin	3/5 stars
Uncut	4/5 stars

Real Emotional Trash is the fourth album by Stephen Malkmus and the Jicks. The album was released on March 4, 2008, by Matador Records. It was leaked on to the internet January 13, 2008. The album peaked at No. 64 on the Billboard 200.

The album features Quasi and Sleater-Kinney drummer Janet Weiss.

The album was recorded at SnowGhost Music in Whitefish, Montana, and Wilco's Foxtrot Studio in Chicago, Illinois.

== Track listing ==
1. "Dragonfly Pie" - 5:08
2. "Hopscotch Willie" - 6:56
3. "Cold Son" - 3:43
4. "Real Emotional Trash" - 10:09
5. "Out of Reaches" - 4:51
6. "Baltimore" - 6:37
7. "Gardenia" - 2:54
8. "Elmo Delmo" - 6:42
9. "We Can't Help You" - 3:04
10. "Wicked Wanda" - 5:06

Bonus tracks

11. "Walk Into the Mirror" - 3:39
12. "Mr. Jolly" - 3:44

== Personnel ==
- Stephen Malkmus - guitar, vocals
- Joanna Bolme - bass, background vocals, synthesizer
- Janet Weiss - drums
- Mike Clark - keyboards, guitar, synthesizer

== Credits ==
- Mixed by Nicolas Vernhes and The Jicks at the Rare Book Room, Brooklyn, New York
- Recorded by TJ Doherty and Brett Allen (assistant)
- Additional Recording by Sean Flora and Zach Okun

== Album covers ==
There are several cover designs, all using the same image, but with differences in the artist / band name (using different colours). Examples are STEPHEN MALKMUS & JICKS (with white and/or blue text), SM & JICKS, and MALKMUS & JICKS. The cover image incorporates elements from a 1973/4 issue of Graphis Annual.
