= Janet Weiss =

American rock drummer (born 1965)

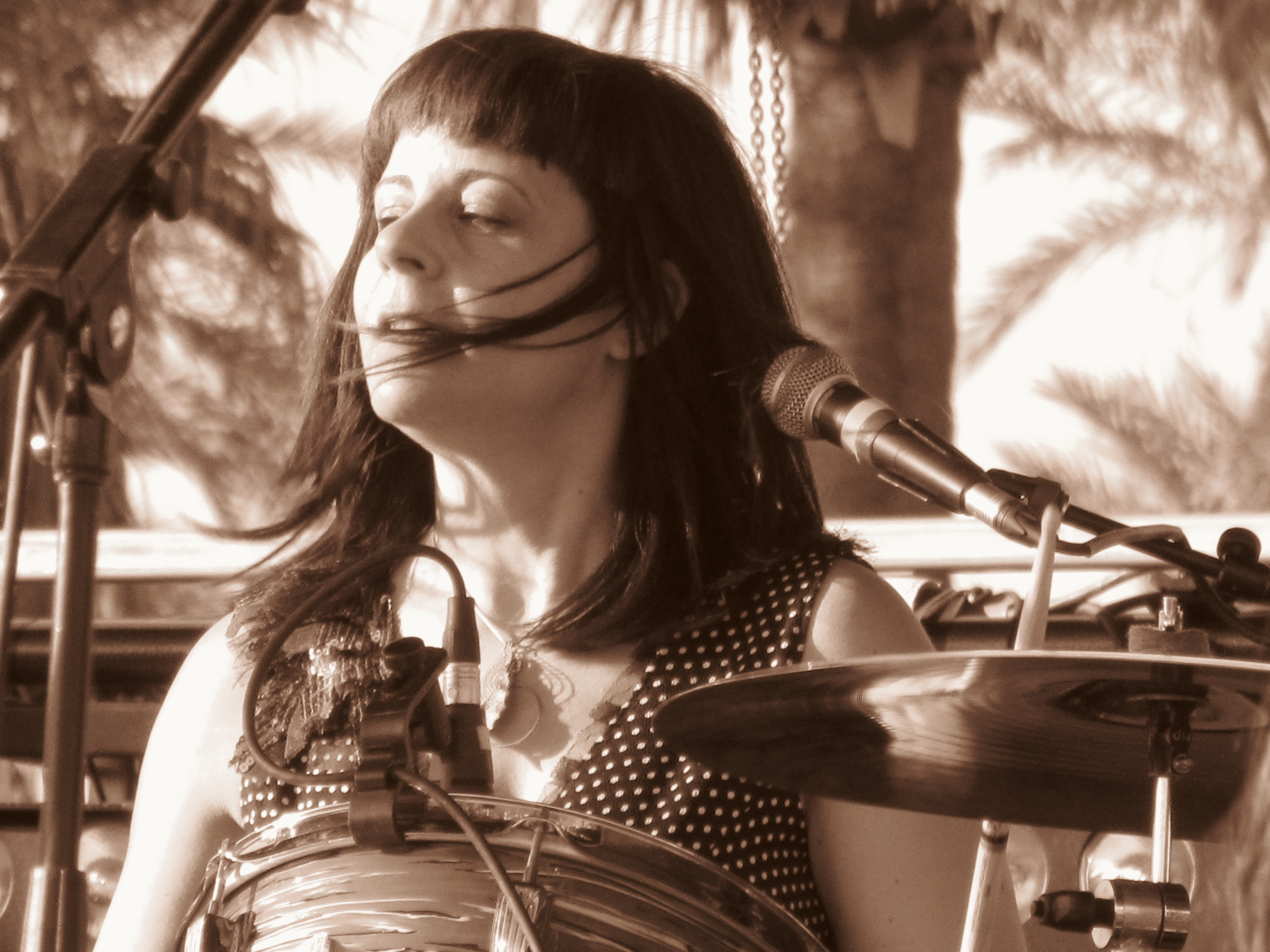
- Weiss performing with Wild Flag at Coachella 2012

Background information
- Born: Janet Lee Weiss; September 24, 1965 (age 60); Los Angeles, California, U.S.
- Genres: Indie rock, alternative rock
- Occupation: Musician
- Instruments: Drums, guitar, vocals, harmonica
- Years active: 1989–present
- Member of: Quasi
- Formerly of: Sleater-Kinney, The Jicks, Junior High, The Shadow Mortons, The Go-Betweens, Goldcard, The Furies, Motorgoat, Wild Flag, Drumgasm, Slang

Janet Lee Weiss (born September 24, 1965) is an American rock drummer, a member of Quasi and former member of Sleater-Kinney. She was the drummer for Stephen Malkmus and the Jicks, leaving after the album Mirror Traffic, and contributed to the Shins' fourth studio album, Port of Morrow (2012). She was also the drummer for the supergroup Wild Flag.

Weiss is highly regarded as a drummer; Stylus Magazine listed her in 2007 as number 48 of rock's 50 greatest drummers, while in 2014 LA Weekly placed her at number 12 in the top 20. In 2016, Rolling Stone placed her at number 90 on its list of the 100 Greatest Drummers of All Time, and in 2018, New Musical Express ranked her as number 25 of the top 32 rock drummers.

== Early life and education ==
Weiss was born in Hollywood, Los Angeles, California to a Jewish family, and began playing guitar at the age of 16. According to her interviews, her two elder sisters introduced her to "good music." She left Hollywood at age 17. She attended San Francisco State University and graduated with a degree in photography.

== Career ==
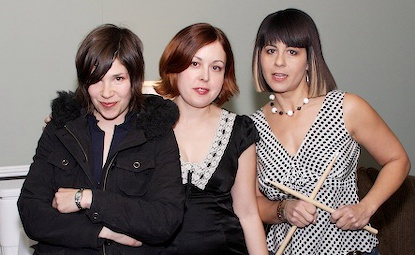
Weiss (right) with Sleater-Kinney bandmates Carrie Brownstein (left) and Corin Tucker, backstage at SXSW 2006

=== The Furies ===
While in college in San Francisco, Weiss became involved in the local club scene, following local bands such as Camper Van Beethoven and the Donner Party, and absorbing their punky/DIY ethos. When she was 22, Weiss was invited to learn the drums to join an all-girl trio called the Furies as their replacement drummer for a West Coast tour. The Furies' guitarist found Weiss a drum kit at a local pawn shop, and with one drum lesson and about two weeks practice under her belt, she became the Furies' second drummer. Self-taught as a drummer, Weiss learned her technique by watching the drummers at innumerable live shows, and by studying rock and punk greats like John Bonham and Topper Headon. She moved to Portland, Oregon in 1989 and soon after began playing with former Donner Party leader, Sam Coomes, in a band called Motorgoat. (Motorgoat disbanded and reformed as Quasi in 1993; Coomes is Weiss's ex-husband.)

=== Sleater-Kinney ===
Weiss started playing with Corin Tucker and Carrie Brownstein in Sleater-Kinney in 1996, after seeing them play a show. Tucker and Brownstein then played her a new song they were working on at the time, "Dig Me Out". Her bandmates later said that she made up a beat so solid "you could practically bang your head against it." Weiss eventually became the band's drummer; she was the fourth in the band's history. Brownstein has described Weiss as "one of the most musically intelligent people I know" and "certainly the most musically gifted member of the band, the one with the largest musical lexicon and sphere from which to draw influence and reference."

On July 1, 2019, Sleater-Kinney announced via social media that Weiss would be leaving the group and would not be joining their upcoming fall tour. Weiss said that the band was taking a "new direction" and that it was time for her to exit.

=== Quasi ===
Weiss and Sam Coomes formed Quasi in 1993, and the band has remained active both as a duo and a trio, featuring Joanna Bolme from 2007 to 2011, for the past 30+ years.

=== The Jicks ===
Upon the dissolution of Sleater-Kinney in 2006, Weiss joined Quasi bandmate Joanna Bolme in Stephen Malkmus and the Jicks. She performed on two albums, Real Emotional Trash (2008) and Mirror Traffic (2011). She left the band prior to its tour in support of the latter album.

=== Wild Flag ===
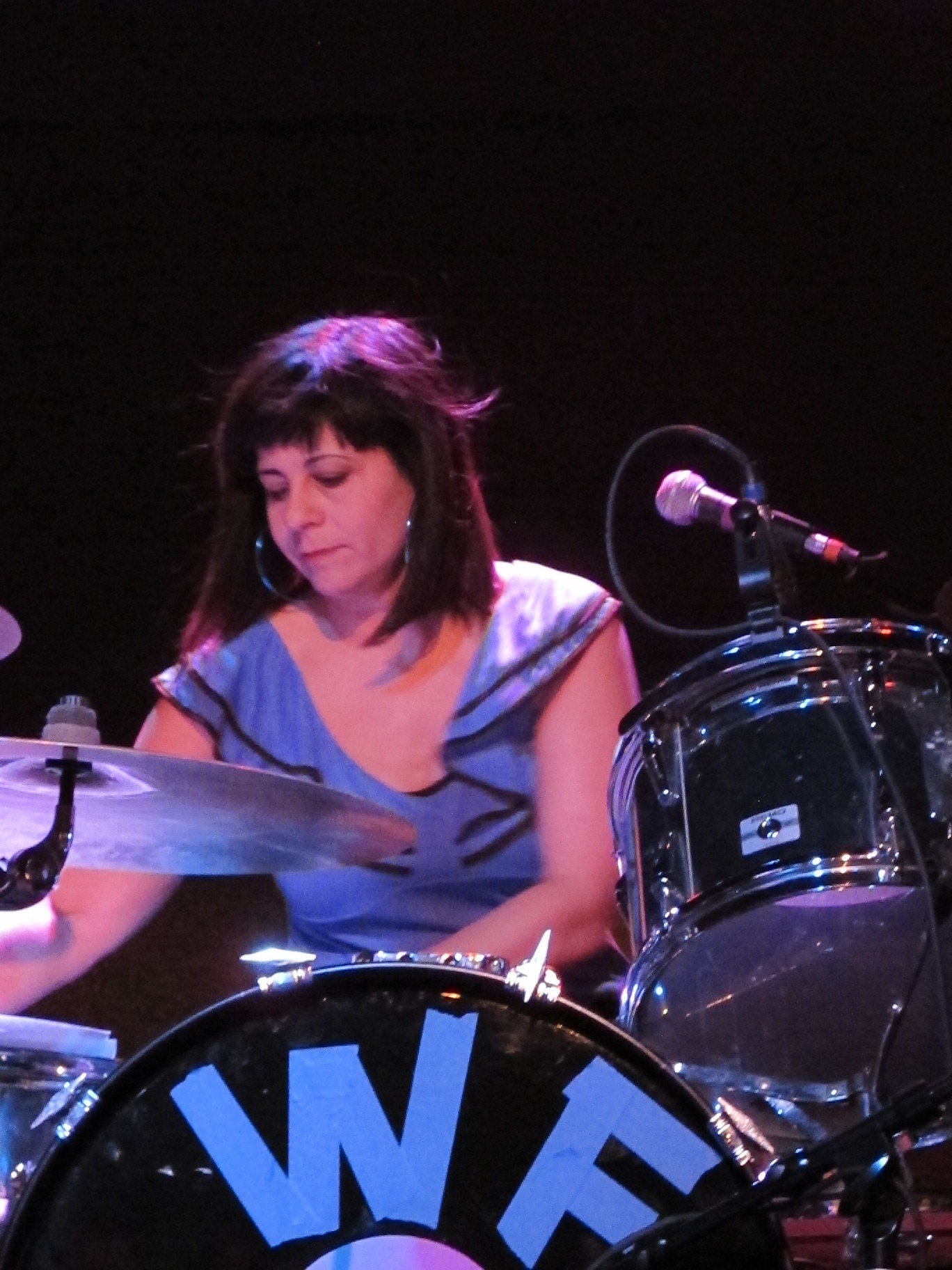
Weiss of Wild Flag

Beginning in September 2010, she drummed in Wild Flag, with Carrie Brownstein (Sleater-Kinney), Mary Timony (Helium), and Rebecca Cole (the Minders). By December 2013, Wild Flag had disbanded.

=== Other work ===
She has also played for Bright Eyes, Junior High, the Shadow Mortons, the Go Betweens, Sarah Dougher, Elliott Smith, and one Goldcard song. She is in the band Slang, with her partner Drew Grow (formerly of Modern Kin, Careen, Drew Grow and the Pastors' Wives, and Five O'Clock People).

On June 4, 2007, she performed with Bright Eyes on the Late Show with David Letterman before joining the band for their summer European tour.

=== Portlandia ===
Weiss was part of the production team on the TV show, Portlandia, working as the permit manager; bandmate Carrie Brownstein was one of the show's creators and lead actors.

== Equipment ==
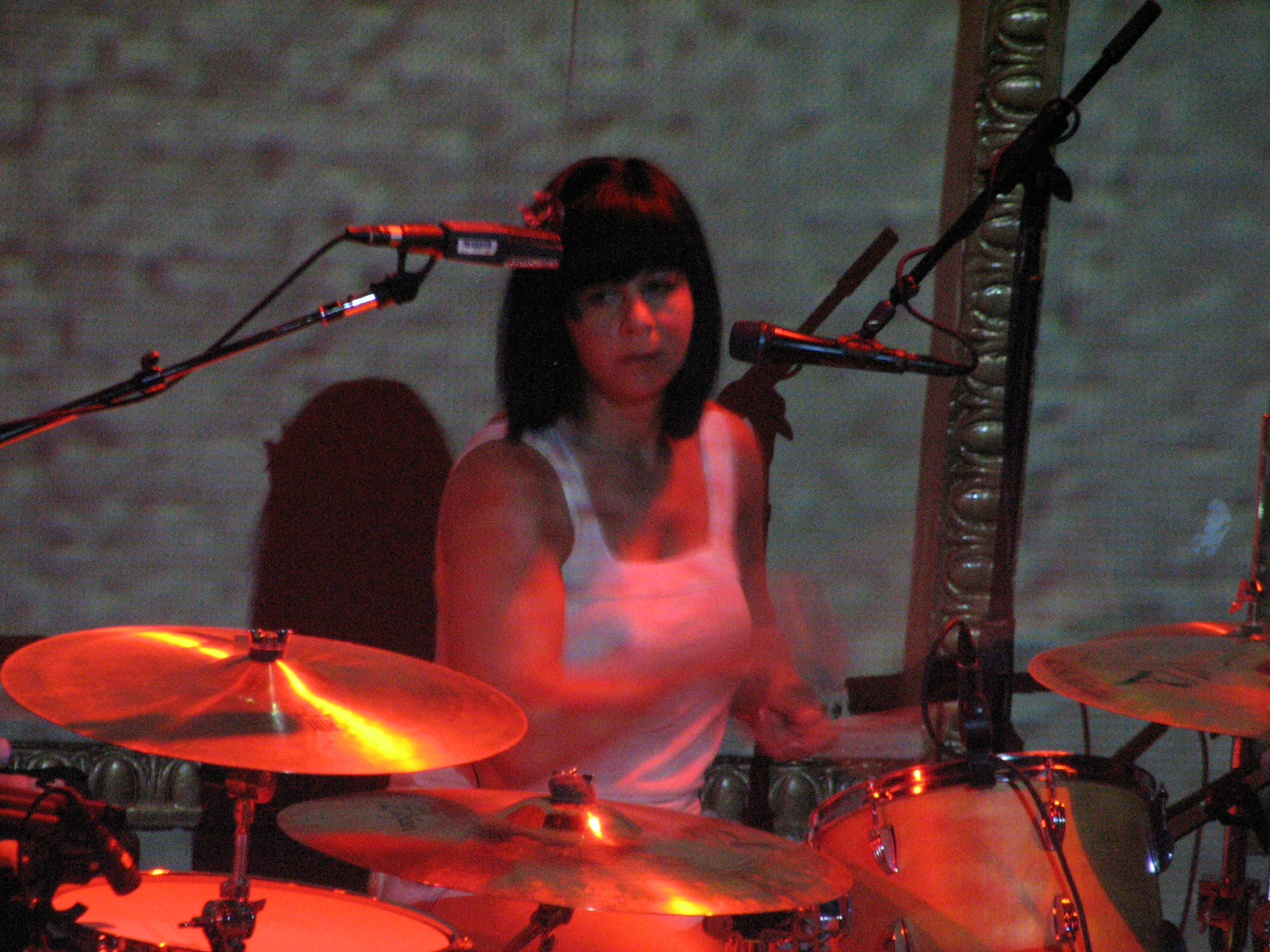
Weiss performing with Bright Eyes in 2007

Weiss plays a vintage Ludwig kit (ca. 1973) in natural maple finish. Specs. as follows:

- 6.5x14" Craviotto Snare
- 9x13 rack tom
- 16x16 floor tom
- 14x22 bass drum

She played a similar kit at Coachella in April 2008, except the Ludwigs were the Blue Oyster 'Bowling Ball' finish. The Craviotto snare was still natural maple.

Cymbals: Zildjian

- 14" Quick Beat hi-hats
- 20" crash
- 22" ride
- 20" A Custom crash

Hardware: DW

Heads:

- Remo coated Ambassadors on snare and toms, Powerstroke 3 on bass drum batter.

Sticks:

- Silverfox MR

== Album appearances ==
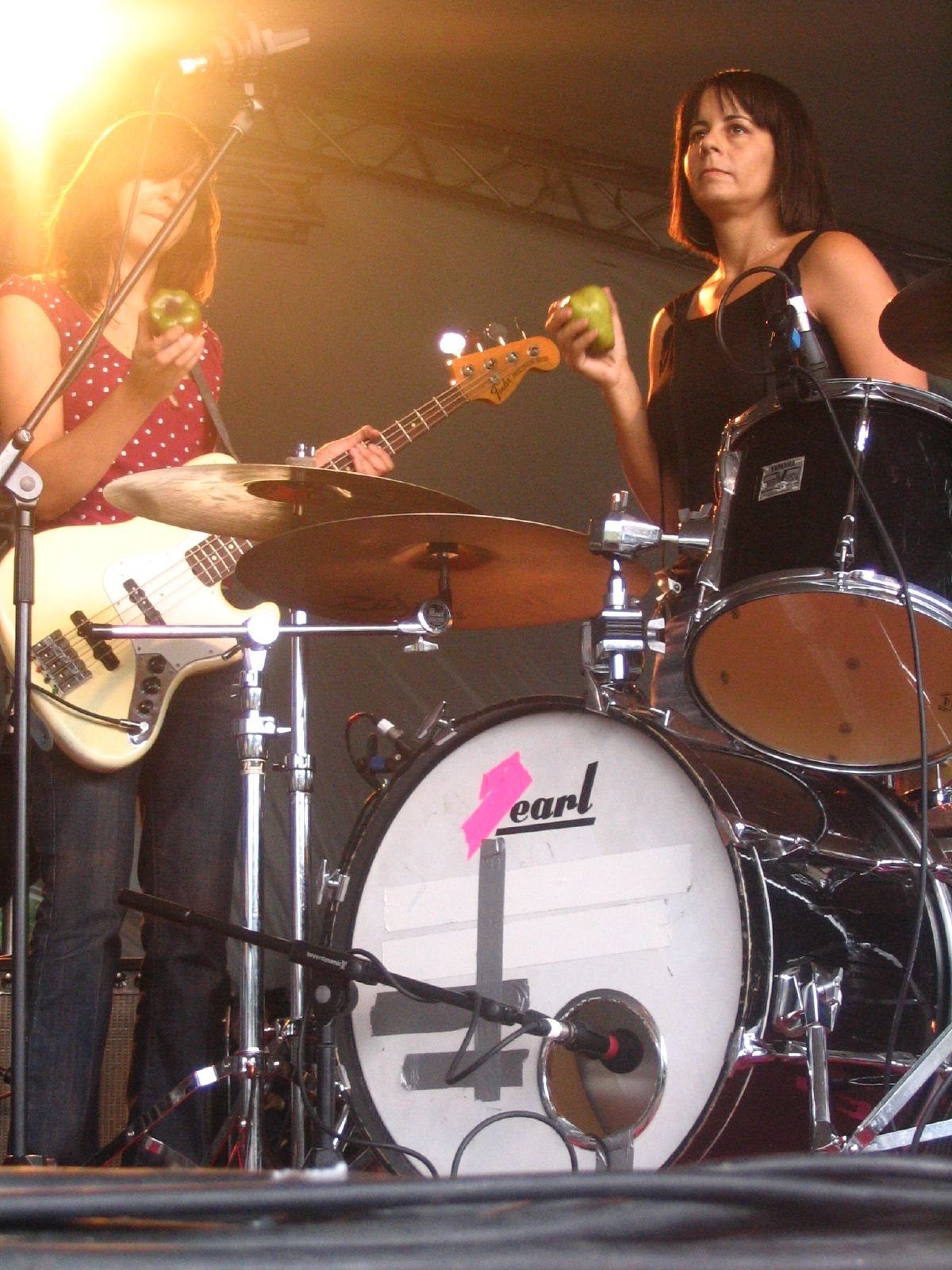
Weiss (right) with Quasi bandmate Joanna Bolme at The Green Man Festival 2006

- Quasi – Early Recordings (1996, Key Op)
- Sleater-Kinney - Dig Me Out (1997, Kill Rock Stars)
- Quasi – R&B Transmogrification (1997, Up Records)
- Quasi – Featuring "Birds" (1998, Up)
- Sleater-Kinney – The Hot Rock (1999, Kill Rock Stars)
- Quasi – Field Studies (1999, Up)
- Sleater-Kinney – All Hands on the Bad One (2000, Kill Rock Stars)
- The Go-Betweens - The Friends of Rachel Worth (2000)
- Quasi – The Sword of God (2001, Touch and Go Records)
- Sarah Dougher – The Bluff (2001, Mr. Lady Records)
- Sleater-Kinney – One Beat (2002, Kill Rock Stars)
- Quasi – Hot Shit! (2003 Touch and Go Records)
- Sleater-Kinney – The Woods (2005, Sub Pop)
- Quasi – When The Going Gets Dark (2006, Touch and Go Records)
- Bright Eyes – Four Winds (2007, Saddle Creek)
- Bright Eyes – Cassadaga (2007, Saddle Creek)
- Stephen Malkmus and the Jicks – Real Emotional Trash (2008, Matador Records)
- Conor Oberst - Conor Oberst (2008, Merge Records)
- Quasi - American Gong (2010, Kill Rock Stars)
- Stephen Malkmus and the Jicks – Mirror Traffic (2011, Matador Records)
- Wild Flag – Wild Flag (2011, Merge Records)
- The Shins - Port of Morrow (2012)
- Weiss / Cameron / Hill - Drumgasm (2013, Jackpot Records)
- Quasi - Mole City (2013, Kill Rock Stars)
- Sleater-Kinney - No Cities to Love (2015, Sub Pop)
- Sleater-Kinney - The Center Won't Hold (2019, Mom + Pop Music)
- Quasi - Breaking the Balls of History (2023, Sub Pop)
