= Face the Truth =

Face the Truth may refer to:

- Face the Truth (Stephen Malkmus album)
- Face the Truth (John Norum album)
- Face the Truth (TV series), a syndicated panel show hosted by Vivica A. Fox aired from September 2018 to May 2019
- Sacch Ka Saamna (lit. 'Face the Truth'), a 2009 Indian TV game show, based on the American show The Moment of Truth

== See also ==
- Pehchaan: The Face of Truth, a 2005 Indian film
