= Beyond the Sky =

Beyond the Sky may refer to:

- Beyond the Sky (film), a 2018 American science fiction film
- "Beyond the Sky", a track on 2006 Quasi album When the Going Gets Dark
- Beyond the Sky, American band formed by Ryan Cabrera
