= Mole City =

Studio album by Quasi
- Released: October 1, 2013
- Genre: Indie rock
- Label: Kill Rock Stars (US); Domino (UK)

Quasi chronology
American Gong (2011)	Mole City (2013)	Breaking the Balls of History (2023)

Professional ratings
Review scores
Source	Rating
AllMusic	4/5 stars
Consequence of Sound	C+
Pitchfork	6/10
Tiny Mix Tapes	3/5 stars
Under the Radar	6/10 stars

Mole City is the ninth studio album by the American indie band Quasi. The album was officially announced by the band via a video trailer in May 2013, with a track listing and pre-orders made available the following June. It was released on October 1, 2013, on Kill Rock Stars and Domino Records in the US and UK, respectively.

== Track listing ==
1. "*"
2. "You Can Stay But You Gotta Go"
3. "See You on Mars"
4. "Blasted"
5. "Chrome Duck"
6. "Chumps of Chance"
7. "Fat Fanny Land"
8. "Nostalgia Kills"
9. "R.I.P."
10. "Headshrinker"
11. "Bedbug Town"
12. "The Goat"
13. "Geraldine"
14. "Loopy"
15. "Double Deuce"
16. "Gnot"
17. "Dust of the Sun"
18. "Mole City"
19. "An Ice Cube in the Sun"
20. "One & Done"
21. "The Dying Man"
22. "Clap Trap"
23. "New Western Way"
24. "Beyond the Return of the Sun of Nowhere"

== Personnel ==
- Sam Coomes – vocals, guitars, Roxichord, keyboards, recording engineer, mixing, producer
- Janet Weiss – vocals, drums, recording engineer, mixing, producer
- Aindriaís Dolan – cover illustration
- Dana Mozer – photography
- Timothy Stollenwerk – mastering
