= No Memory =

Studio album by No. 2
- Released: 1999
- Genre: Indie rock
- Length: 30:14
- Label: Chainsaw

No. 2 chronology
No Memory (1999)	What Does Good Luck Bring? (2002)

No Memory is the debut studio album by American indie rock band No. 2, released in 1999 by record label Chainsaw.

== Content ==
Elliott Smith, No. 2 frontman Neil Gust's former Heatmiser bandmate, performs backing vocals on "Critical Mass" as well as mixing on most of the album.

== Release ==
No Memory was released in 1999 by record label Chainsaw. The album was remastered and reissued on 180-gram vinyl on Record Store Day 2015 by Jackpot Records. The reissue, limited to 1500 copies, features previously-unheard bonus tracks.

== Reception ==
Professional ratings
Review scores
Source	Rating
AllMusic	4.5/5 stars
CMJ New Music Report	favourable

Ron Hart of CMJ New Music Report called it "a more realised version of the Apple/Dischord Records hybrid once orchestrated by, well, Heatmiser. But the No. 2's debut achieves its own gorgeous, pitch-perfect balance between acoustic Simon and Garfunkel-ish harmonies and a post-British Invasion power pop punch, as it sways with all the candor of Gust's old band. [...] The half-hour No Memory may be short on time, but it's endless on soul."

== Track listing ==
1. "Critical Mass" – 3:07
2. "Never Felt Better" – 2:48
3. "Move It Along" – 3:33
4. "So Long" – 2:48
5. "Just Answer the Man" – 4:18
6. "Pop in C" – 2:48
7. "Practicing Your Moves" – 3:01
8. "Pop in A Minor" – 2:25
9. "Nobody's Satisfied" – 2:29
10. "Parting Kiss" – 2:57

== Bonus tracks on 2015 reissue ==
1. Allistair Chestnut (Harmony Mix)
2. Powder Blue
3. Run Through
4. Little Face
5. Critical Mass (Demo)
6. Never Felt Better (Demo)
7. Practicing Your Moves (Demo)
8. Parting Kiss (Demo)

== Personnel ==
- Neil Gust – vocals, guitar, keyboards
- Gilly Ann Hanner – backing vocals, bass guitar
- Paul Pulvirenti – drums, percussion

Additional personnel

- Joanna Bolme – hand claps on "Critical Mass", engineering
- Sam Coomes – bass guitar on "Never Felt Better" and "Nobody's Satisfied", backing vocals on "So Long"
- Stef Darensbourg – hand claps on "Critical Mass"
- Tony Lash – electric piano (on "Never Felt Better"), engineering
- Elliott Smith – backing vocals on "Critical Mass", "So Long" and last four bonus tracks, mixing

Technical

- Larry Crane – engineering, mixing
