= Breaking the Balls of History =

Studio album by Quasi
- Released: February 10, 2023
- Genre: Garage rock; sunshine pop
- Length: 36:00
- Label: Sub Pop
- Producer: John Goodmanson

Quasi chronology
Mole City (2013)	Breaking the Balls of History (2023)

Breaking the Balls of History is the tenth studio album by American indie rock band Quasi, released on February 10, 2023, through Sub Pop. It was the band's first album in 10 years, following Mole City (2013), and was produced by John Goodmanson. The album received acclaim from critics.

== Background ==
Vocalist and drummer Janet Weiss broke her legs and collarbone in a car crash in 2019, and by the time she had healed, the world was experiencing lockdowns as a result of the COVID-19 pandemic, so she worked on the album with bandmate Sam Coomes.

== Critical reception ==
Professional ratings
Aggregate scores
Source	Rating
Metacritic	82/100
Review scores
Source	Rating
DIY	4/5 stars
Exclaim!	8/10
Mojo	4/5 stars
Pitchfork	6.3/10
PopMatters	8/10
Uncut	9/10

Breaking the Balls of History received a score of 82 out of 100 on review aggregator Metacritic based on 10 critics' reviews, indicating "universal acclaim". Uncut called it "pure, distilled Quasi" and felt that "Sam Coomes's songs are all killer. [...] Janet Weiss, meanwhile, once again proves herself to be a fine vocal foil, and perhaps the greatest rock drummer alive". Mojo stated called it Quasi's "most corrosive cocktail yet of melodious sunshine pop and blackly comedic lyrics". DIY's Elvis Thirlwell described it as "an effervescence of headlong, wind-slicing garage rock that's equal parts brazen, jubilant and loud" with tracks that "land someplace cool between corny absurdity, and wry sincerity. Littered with askew lyrical turns".

Christopher J. Lee of PopMatters felt that the album "continues [the band's] momentum of irrepressible songcraft. Carrying the torch for three decades now, Quasi have become one of the more enduring musical collaborations out of the Pacific Northwest, and this is a peak moment in their discography. After ten years of patience, Quasi deserve their due". Exclaim!'s Alan Ranta stated that Weiss and Coombes "have never sounded more together, more single-minded and strong-willed. They made an album that needed to be made". Nina Corcoran of Pitchfork wrote that Quasi "sound rejuvenated and youthful, but they forget to look beyond the moment that prompted their rebirth" and remarked that the album "has a blurry quality: a jumble of all-too-familiar thoughts that never add up to a breakthrough".

== Track listing ==
Breaking the Balls of History track listing
No.	Title	Length
1.	"Last Long Laugh"	3:02
2.	"Back in Your Tree"	2:45
3.	"Queen of Ears"	3:06
4.	"Gravity"	3:16
5.	"Shitty Is Pretty"	2:48
6.	"Riots & Jokes"	3:40
7.	"Breaking the Balls of History"	1:09
8.	"Doomscrollers"	4:23
9.	"Inbetweenness"	2:56
10.	"Nowheresville"	2:54
11.	"Rotten Wrock"	3:23
12.	"The Losers Win"	3:30
Total length:		36:00
