= Shiggy =

Shiggy may refer to:

- Shiggy Konno (金野 滋 Konno Shigeru), Japanese rugby footballer
- Tetsuro Shigematsu, Canadian comedian
- Shiggi, a village of the Umarzai (Muhammadzai)
- "Shiggy", a song by Stephen Malkmus & the Jicks from their 2018 album Sparkle Hard
- Shigeru Miyamoto, Japanese video game designer
