= What Does Good Luck Bring? =

Studio album by No. 2
- Released: 2002
- Genre: Indie rock
- Length: 36:07
- Label: In Music We Trust

No. 2 chronology
No Memory (1999)	What Does Good Luck Bring? (2002)

What Does Good Luck Bring? is the second album by American indie rock band No. 2, released in 2002 by record label In Music We Trust.

== Release ==
What Does Good Luck Bring? was released in 2002 by record label In Music We Trust.

== Reception ==
Professional ratings
Review scores
Source	Rating
AllMusic	4/5 stars
CMJ New Music Monthly	generally favorable
Pitchfork	7.0/10

Matt Fink of AllMusic called it "another slab of uniformly solid indie rock".

== Track listing ==
1. "A Little Confusion" – 4:44
2. "More, More" – 3:37
3. "Stranger's March" – 3:53
4. "For the Last Time" – 3:46
5. "8:45 AM" – 1:57
6. "Traveling" – 5:49
7. "Is It True?" – 3:24
8. "Good Intentions" – 4:37
9. "What Does Good Luck Bring?" – 4:20
10. "Who's Behind The Door?" (2017 bonus track, featuring Elliott Smith)

== Personnel ==
- Neil Gust – vocals, guitar, keyboards
- Paul Pulvirenti – drums, percussion
- Jim Talstra – backing vocals, bass

Additional personnel

- Sam Coomes – keyboards (on the track "What Does Good Luck Bring")

Technical personnel

- Joanna Bolme – engineering
- Jeff Saltzman – engineering, mixing
- Tony Lash – mastering
