= The Spinanes =

American indie rock band

Background information
- Origin: Portland, Oregon (US)
- Genres: Indie rock
- Years active: 1991–2000
- Labels: IMP Records, Sub Pop, Merge
- Past members: Rebecca Gates; Scott Plouf

The Spinanes were an American indie rock band, primarily active during the 1990s. The band was founded by and initially consisted only of singer-songwriter/guitarist Rebecca Gates and drummer Scott Plouf. They released three albums on the Sub Pop label before Gates retired the name in 2001 and began releasing music as a solo artist; Plouf began playing with Built to Spill in 1996 and left The Spinanes shortly thereafter to become their permanent drummer.

== History ==
The duo formed in Portland, Oregon, in 1991, just as worldwide interest in the music scene of the Pacific Northwest was beginning to crest. The Spinanes played one of their first shows at the International Pop Underground Convention in August 1991 in Olympia, Washington. After releasing two singles on the local label IMP Records in 1992, they were signed by Sub Pop, who issued the single "Spitfire" in mid-1993, followed that October by their first full-length album, Manos. Much was made of The Spinanes' unorthodox lineup – specifically, the lack of bass guitar – but it proved invaluable in helping them forge a more singular, original sound. In a March 2010 review, nearly two decades after the album's release, eMusic praised them for having "a sense of negative space that's rare for a rock band", then went on to describe their sound as "Gates's dreamy murmur and resonant, open-tuned riffs up top, Plouf's inexorable attack at the bottom, and nothing but air between them." Manos became the first album released by Sub Pop to hit No. 1 on the college radio charts; its second single, "Noel, Jonah and Me", received considerable airplay on college and alternative radio stations and video outlets such as MTV's 120 Minutes. A video was also made for a third single, "Sunday", in 1994, but the duo's appearances over the following two years were largely limited to separate guest spots on their friends' records. Merge Records re-issued Manos in 2018.

Gates provided backup vocals on Elliott Smith's "St. Ides Heaven" (from his self-titled album), as well as on multiple tracks on Ben Lee's first album, Grandpaw Would. Plouf did a brief stint in Team Dresch, and appeared on their first single, "Hand Grenade"; he also played on the Beck album One Foot in the Grave.

The Spinanes regrouped in 1996 for the release of their second album, Strand, which was bookended by the singles "Madding" and "Lines and Lines". Elliott Smith, in turn, provides backup vocals, as does John Moen (of Dharma Bums and The Decemberists). Around the same time, Plouf began playing with Built to Spill, but due to that band's signing with Warner Bros. Records, he was unable to continue with both bands full-time, and in 1997, he made the decision to leave The Spinanes.

Gates then relocated to Chicago, Illinois, reconfigured The Spinanes as a three-piece with bassist Joanna Bolme and drummer Jerry Busher, and began work on another album at Easley McCain Recording in Memphis, Tennessee. Additional tracks were recorded with John McEntire (of Tortoise and The Sea and Cake) at his Soma Electronic Music Studios, one of which features vocalist Sam Prekop (also of The Sea and Cake). The resulting album, Arches and Aisles, was released in June 1998. An album consisting of early Spinanes singles, Imp Years, came out in 2000. Gates shed the Spinanes moniker in 2001 and released Ruby Series.

== Discography ==
=== Albums ===
- Manos (Sub Pop, 1993; Merge re-issue, 2018)
- Strand (Sub Pop, 1996)
- Arches and Aisles (Sub Pop, 1998)

=== EPs ===
- Imp Years (Merge Records, 2000)

=== Singles ===
- Madding (Single Version)/10 Metre Platform (Sub Pop, 1996)
- All Sold Out (Sub Pop, 1996)

=== Compilation appearances ===
- "Jad Fair Drives Women Wild" on International Pop Underground Convention (K Records, 1991)
- "Stupid Crazy" on Rock Stars Kill (Kill Rock Stars, 1994)
- "Grand Prize" on Wild and Wooly: The Northwest Rock Collection (Sub Pop/Experience Music Project, 2000)
