= Manos (album) =

Studio album by the Spinanes
- Released: 1993
- Recorded: 1993
- Genre: Rock
- Length: 41:57
- Label: Sub Pop

The Spinanes chronology
Manos (1993)	Strand (1996)

Manos is an album by the Spinanes, released in 1993 on Sub Pop Records. Soon after its release, it became the first album released on an independent label to top the American college charts.

Manos was re-issued in 2018 by Merge Records.

== Critical reception ==
Professional ratings
Review scores
Source	Rating
AllMusic	4.5/5 stars
Chicago Tribune	3/4 stars
Christgau's Consumer Guide	(dud)
Pitchfork	8.5/10

Ira Robbins, in Newsday, listed Manos as the ninth best album of 1993.

== Track listing ==
1. "Entire" – 2:28
2. "Noel, Jonah and Me" – 3:25
3. "Spitfire" – 3:10
4. "I Love that Party with the Monkey Kitty" – 2:46
5. "Uneasy" – 2:39
6. "Epiphany" – 5:15
7. "Manos" – 4:26
8. "Dangle" – 3:01
9. "Basement Galaxy" – 3:31
10. "Grand Prize" – 3:21
11. "Sunday" – 2:54
12. "Shellburn" – 5:02
