= Imp Years =

EP by The Spinanes
- Released: April 10, 2000
- Recorded: 2000
- Genre: Rock
- Length: 25:11
- Label: Merge Records

The Spinanes chronology
Arches and Aisles (1998)	Imp Years (2000)

Professional ratings
Review scores
Source	Rating
AllMusic	4/5 stars
Pitchfork	5.9/10

Imp Years is an EP by The Spinanes. It was released on April 10, 2000. It is a collection of rarities and previously unreleased tracks.

== Track listing ==
1. "Suffice" – 3:50
2. "Halloween Candy" – 3:34
3. "Rummy" – 4:21
4. "Hawaiian Baby" – 5:46
5. "Messy Shitty" – 3:32
6. "Handful Of Hearts" – 4:09
