= Strand (album) =

Studio album by The Spinanes
- Released: February 27, 1996
- Recorded: 1996
- Genre: Indie rock
- Length: 53:25
- Label: Sub Pop
- Producer: Spinanes

The Spinanes chronology
Manos (1993)	Strand (1996)	Arches and Aisles (1998)

Professional ratings
Review scores
Source	Rating
AllMusic	4.5/5 stars
Alternative Press	3/5 stars
The Encyclopedia of Popular Music	3/5 stars
MusicHound Rock	3.5/5 stars
Spin	6/10

Strand is the second studio album by the American indie rock band The Spinanes, released in 1996 by Sub Pop.

== Production ==
The album was recorded in Memphis, Tennessee. Elliott Smith sings on two tracks.

== Release and promotion ==
Strand was released on February 27, 1996, by Sub Pop. To promote the album, the band performed with two additional musicians at Lounge Ax in Chicago, Illinois, on March 26, 1996.

== Critical reception ==
AllMusic praised the album's variety of instruments and the addition of guest vocalists. The Washington Post wrote: "With Rebecca Gates adding piano, organ and mellotron to her guitar, such hushed, atmospheric tracks as 'Madding' and 'Luminous' live up to their Cocteau Twinnish titles." Magnet wrote that the album "transcended [the band's] ragged Northwest-indie roots and gave Gates’ smart songwriting a dreamy, atmospheric sheen." Trouser Press wrote that "the album exists on another plane, a dreamstate rooted in studio experimentation not live practicality."

== Track listing ==
1. "Madding" – 5:28
2. "Azure" – 3:51
3. "Lines and Lines" – 6:23
4. "Meridian" – 3:53
5. "Punch Line Loser" – 4:01
6. "Valency" – 3:26
7. "Luminous" – 6:03
8. "Oceanwide" – 5:40
9. "Winter On Ice" – 6:00
10. "Watch Down" – 4:23
11. "For No One Else" – 4:16
