= Donner Party (band) =

US musical group

- Origin: San Francisco, California, USA
- Genre: Indie rock
- Years active: 1986–1989
- Labels: Cryptovision, Pitch-A-Tent
- Past members: Sam Coomes; Reinhold Johnson; Melanie Clarin

Donner Party was a San Francisco–based indie rock band, performing between 1986 and 1989. The band consisted of Melanie Clarin on drums and accordion; Sam Coomes on guitar, violin, and banjo; and Reinhold Johnson on bass. The band released two albums, both self-titled; the first was released in 1987 on the Cryptovision Records label, and the second on Camper Van Beethoven's Pitch-A-Tent label in 1988. These two albums, plus an unreleased third album and some live tracks, were collected and released as Complete Recordings 1987–1989 in 2000 on Innerstate Records. The band played a one-time reunion show on April 16, 2000, at Slim's in San Francisco.

Named after a group of 19th-century American travelers who turned cannibals while stranded, the Donner Party's songs frequently took a comic view of death and its attendant dread (and also, as it happens, food). Titles include "When You Die Your Eyes Pop Out", "John Wilkes Booth", "Try to Imagine a Terrible World", and "Boxfull of Bones". "When I Was a Baby", recorded with a cheap organ with almost whispery vocals to sound somehow homey and quaint, begins: "When I was a baby I looked like a pig/My nose was a snout and my ears were too big," and only gets creepier from there. The amusingly titled "Mom Please Don't Listen" is basically a litany of coprophagia and gory death. In "Would You Like to Have Something to Eat?", they link failing to follow parents' nutritional imperatives with being sent to Hell. In contrast, their cover version of the Sesame Street song "Up & Down," designed to teach the literal concepts of "up" and "down," is performed cheerfully yet not exaggeratedly—in keeping with the spirit of the original song from the series. In 2000, "Would You Like to Have Something To Eat?" was featured in a commercial for HomeGrocer.com, an early online grocery delivery service.

Clarin also played drums in another San Francisco folk-rock band, The Cat Heads, and also in Harm Farm. Coomes would later play in Heatmiser, and then form Motorgoat and Quasi with his ex-wife, Janet Weiss.

== Discography ==
- The Donner Party (1987), Cryptovision (shown as Donner Party on the label)
- Donner Party (1988), Pitch-A-Tent
- Complete Recordings 1987-1989 (2000), Innerstate
