= The Cat Heads =

American indie rock band

The Cat Heads were an indie rock band from San Francisco. The band formed in 1985 with a later line-up recording as The (ex) Cat Heads.

== History ==
The original line-up of the band was former Love Circus and Leaches singer Mark Zanandrea (vocals, guitar), former Ophelias guitarist Sam Babbitt, former X-tal bassist Alan Korn, and Donner Party drummer Melanie Clarin. They signed to Enigma/Restless, and released their debut album, Hubba (produced by Matt Piucci of Rain Parade), in 1987, described as a mix of "punk, post-punk, folk-rock, and country". They followed this in 1988 with Submarine, this time with David Lowery producing. Zanandrea and Clarin then left, to be replaced by Barry Hall and John Stewart, continuing as The (ex) Cat Heads, although Clarin returned to guest (on "Anti-song") on their 1989 album Our Frisco. Clarin and Zanandrea, meanwhile had joined It Thing. Zanandrea and Babbitt later worked together in The Androgynauts. Babbitt and Korn re-emerged in The Mudsills.

The band have reunited a few times since, including opening for Camper Van Beethoven at the latter's 25th anniversary reunion gig at The Fillmore in 2008.

== Discography ==
- Hubba (1987), Enigma/Restless
- Submarine (1988), Restless
- Our Frisco (1989), Twitch City - as The (ex) Cat Heads
