= Stephen Malkmus (album) =

Studio album by Stephen Malkmus
- Released: February 13, 2001
- Recorded: May–August 2000
- Genre: Indie rock
- Length: 41:37
- Label: Matador
- Producer: Clarence Skiboots

Stephen Malkmus chronology
Stephen Malkmus (2001)	Pig Lib (2003)

Stephen Malkmus is the debut album by Stephen Malkmus and the Jicks, released on February 13, 2001 by Matador Records. Malkmus had planned to create the record by himself, or through a smaller, local label, but eventually accepted the offer Matador made, and he released it. Pre-release promotional CDs of the album exist under the working titles Jicks and Swedish Reggae. Malkmus intended to release the album as The Jicks, but Matador insisted that the album be released under his own name. The album peaked at number 124 in the US and number 49 in the UK.

== Critical reception ==
Professional ratings
Aggregate scores
Source	Rating
Metacritic	82/100
Review scores
Source	Rating
AllMusic	4.5/5 stars
Alternative Press	4/5
Entertainment Weekly	A−
The Guardian	3/5 stars
NME	8/10
Pitchfork	7.7/10
Rolling Stone	3.5/5 stars
The Rolling Stone Album Guide	4/5 stars
Uncut	4/5 stars
The Village Voice	A−

Stephen Malkmus received positive reviews from music critics. Rob Sheffield, writing for Rolling Stone, compared the album favorably to the solo debuts by Television's Tom Verlaine and The Velvet Underground's Lou Reed, commenting: "Freed from the constraints of a band that didn't constrain him all that much, [Malkmus] grapples with the problem of what to do with all the empty spaces in the music". Similarly, Pitchfork reviewer Nick Mirov opined that Malkmus "has regained his songwriting stride, and he sounds more confident than he's been in a long time". The album appeared at number 28 in The Village Voice's Pazz & Jop critics' poll for 2001.

== Track listing ==
No.	Title	Length
1.	"Black Book"	4:23
2.	"Phantasies"	2:40
3.	"Jo Jo's Jacket"	4:01
4.	"Church on White"	3:20
5.	"The Hook"	3:03
6.	"Discretion Grove"	3:14
7.	"Troubbble"	1:40
8.	"Pink India"	5:54
9.	"Trojan Curfew"	4:06
10.	"Vague Space"	2:56
11.	"Jenny and the Ess-Dog"	2:45
12.	"Deado"	3:37
Total length:		41:37

== Personnel ==
- Stephen Malkmus – vocals, guitar, keyboards, synthesizer, bass
- John Moen – drums, percussion, background vocals
- Heather Larimer – percussion, background vocals
- Joanna Bolme – piano, synthesizer, bass, claves, background vocals

== Charts ==
Chart performance for Stephen Malkmus
Chart (2001)	Peak position
Australian Albums (ARIA)	93
French Albums (SNEP)	113
UK Albums (OCC)	49
US Billboard 200	124
US Independent Albums (Billboard)	5
