= Arches and Aisles =

Studio album by The Spinanes
- Released: September 23, 1998
- Recorded: 1998
- Studio: Easley-McCain (Memphis, Tennessee); Soma (Chicago, Illinois)
- Genre: Indie rock; chamber-rock
- Length: 42:31
- Label: Sub Pop

The Spinanes chronology
Strand (1996)	Arches and Aisles (1998)	Imp Years (2000)

Professional ratings
Review scores
Source	Rating
AllMusic	4/5 stars
Christgau's Consumer Guide	(neither)
Palm Beach Post	3/5 stars
Spin	8/10
Sunday Age	3.5/5 stars

Arches and Aisles is an album by The Spinanes, released on September 23, 1998. The album features guest spots and co-production by John McEntire and vocals by Sam Prekop. This is the only Spinanes album to not feature founding member and drummer Scott Plouf, who left the duo in 1997 to join Built to Spill.

== Composition & recording ==
Musically, Arches is considered "richly textured" chamber-rock and indie rock. The album was recorded at Easley McCain Recording in Memphis, Tennessee. Additional tracks were recorded with John McEntire (of Tortoise and The Sea and Cake) at his Soma Electronic Music Studios.

== Critical reception and legacy ==
AllMusic's Michael Gallucci dubbed Arches the group's "least confining, and most listenable" record, noting their "more melodic and lyrically enticing" direction. Spin applauded it, calling it "warm, thoughtful, and melodically gorgeous".

Looking back at the Spinanes' discography, Trouser Press singled it out as "a superlative album of quietly remarkable songs". They acknowledged singer Rebecca Gates' "surefooted songwriting and achingly intimate alto vocals". In 2008, near Sub Pop's 20th anniversary, Treble included it as one of the label's 20 essential releases. Staff writer Jeff Terich dubbed it "a bigger sounding, more sparkling affair" than its predecessors, as well as the Spinanes project's best work. In 2016, it placed #46 on Pitchfork's list of Pacific Northwest indie rock's 50 best albums.

== Track listing ==
1. "Kid in Candy" – 4:33
2. "Greetings from the Sugar Lick" – 4:18
3. "72-74" – 3:06
4. "Leisure Run" – 4:58
5. "Love, the Lazee" – 4:27
6. "Sucker's Trial" – 2:49
7. "Slide Your Ass" – 1:50
8. "Reach V. Speed" – 3:51
9. "Den Trawler" – 4:05
10. "Eleganza" – 4:15
11. "Heisman Stance" – 4:19

== Personnel ==
Credits adapted from Arches and Aisles' liner notes.

The Spinanes

- Rebecca Gates - vocals, guitar, bass, piano, keyboards, Mellotron, organ

with:

- Joanna Bolme - bass, guitar, Moog synthesizer, organ (tracks: 2 to 6, 9, 10)
- Jerry Busher - drums, percussion (tracks: 1–6, 9, 10)
