= Field Studies (album) =

Studio album by Quasi
- Released: September 7, 1999
- Recorded: Jackpot!, Portland, OR; Robert Lang, Seattle, WA; Old Church, Portland, OR
- Genre: Indie rock
- Length: 49:05
- Label: Up Records (U.S.); Domino (UK)
- Producer: Larry Crane; Phil Ek; Quasi

Quasi chronology
| Featuring "Birds" (1998) | Field Studies (1999) | The Sword of God (2001) |

Professional ratings
Review scores
| Source | Rating |
|---|---|
| Allmusic | 4.0/5 stars |
| The Austin Chronicle | 3/4 stars |
| Christgau's Consumer Guide | (2-star Honorable Mention) |
| The New Rolling Stone Album Guide | 3.5/5 stars |
| NME | 8/10 |
| Pitchfork | 6.3/10 |
| Rolling Stone | 3.5/5 stars |
| Spin | 8/10 |
| The Times | 8/10 |

Field Studies is the fourth studio album by the American indie band Quasi. It was released by Up Records on September 7, 1999.

== Track listing ==
All tracks by Sam Coomes except "Two by Two" by Janet Weiss

1. "All the Same" – 4:05
2. "The Golden Egg" – 5:16
3. "The Skeleton" – 1:41
4. "The Star You Left Behind" – 4:35
5. "Empty Words" – 3:53
6. "Birds" – 2:32
7. "A Fable with No Moral" – 7:31
8. "Under a Cloud" – 2:32
9. "Me and My Head" – 3:30
10. "Two by Two" – 2:04
11. "It Don't Mean Nothing" – 1:48
12. "Bon Voyage" – 4:01
13. "Smile" – 3:29
14. "Let's Just Go" – 2:10

== Personnel ==
- Sam Coomes – vocals, guitars, Roxichord, keyboards
- Janet Weiss – vocals, drums
- Elliott Smith – bass on "All the Same", "Empty Words", and "Under a Cloud"
- Strings on "All the Same" and "Smile" by:
  - Brent Arnold – cello, string arrangements
  - Jen Charowhas – violin
  - Frances Woods – viola
  - Greg Campbell – French horn on "Smile"
- Chip Butters – production assistant
- Larry Crane – production
- Phil Ek – production
- Quasi – production
- Tony Lash – mastering
