= R&B Transmogrification =

Studio album by Quasi
- Released: March 25, 1997
- Length: 47:04
- Label: Up Records
- Producers: Charlie Campbell; Quasi

Quasi chronology
Early Recordings (1996)	R&B Transmogrification (1997)	Featuring "Birds" (1998)

Professional ratings
Review scores
Source	Rating
AllMusic	4/5 stars
Pitchfork Media	7.8/10
Record Collector	4/5 stars

R&B Transmogrification is the second studio album by the American indie band Quasi. It was released on March 25, 1997, on Up Records.

== Critical reception ==
Record Collector wrote that the album is "clever from the get-go; between their heavily distorted rocksichord (a kind of electronic keyboard made to approximate the sound of a harpsichord) and lyricism that tells of the worst kind of heartbreak, there’s a sort of commercial viability without selling the soul of these songs." Trouser Press thought that "the imaginative music includes everything commercial pop lacks: the pioneering spirit navigating a sinking ship, violations of civilized taste and neurotic condemnations."

CMJ New Music Monthly said the album contained "these nearly giddy ditties, but underneath the candy coated sheen were dirges about death, heartbreak and failure (perhaps, it must be said, because the two members were recovering from their recent divorce while continuing to perform as a band)."

== Track listing ==
All tracks by Sam Coomes except "Bird's Eye View" by Janet Weiss and Coomes.

1. "Ghost Dreaming" – 3:24
2. "Ballad of Mechanical Man" – 3:13
3. "In the First Place" – 4:02
4. "Bird's Eye View" – 3:23
5. "Two-Faced" – 2:53
6. "Ghost vs. Vampire" – 3:26
7. "R&B Transmogrification" – 2:29
8. "When I'm Dead" – 2:20
9. "Sugar" – 5:27
10. "My Coffin" – 3:59
11. "Mama, Papa, Baby" – 2:59
12. "Chocolate Rabbit" – 3:24
13. "Iron Worm" – 3:18
14. "Clouds" – 2:52

== Personnel ==
- Sam Coomes – vocals, guitars, Roxichord, keyboards
- Janet Weiss – vocals, drums
- Charlie Campbell – recording engineer, mixing
- Quasi – recording engineer, mixing
- Tony Lash – mastering
