= Hot Shit! =

Hot Shit

Studio album by Quasi
- Released: September 9, 2003
- Recorded: Nugget Brain, Portland, OR; The Devil's Workshop, Portland, OR
- Genre: Indie rock, lo-fi, indie pop
- Length: 44:08
- Label: Touch & Go; Domino Recording Company (Europe)
- Producer: Quasi

Quasi chronology
The Sword of God (2001)	Hot Shit (2003)	When the Going Gets Dark (2006)

Professional ratings
Aggregate scores
Source	Rating
Metacritic	78/100
Review scores
Source	Rating
Allmusic	4/5 stars
Spin Magazine	7/10
Pitchfork Media	5.2/10
No Ripcord	6/10

Hot Shit is the fifth studio album by indie rock band Quasi. It was released in 2003 on Touch and Go Records. Early copies as well as the European edition released by Domino Recording Company include a bonus CD entitled Live Shit.

== Track listing ==
All tracks by Sam Coomes except "Sunshine Sounds" and "White Devil's Dream," written by Janet Weiss and Coomes.

No.	Title	Length
1.	"Hot Shit"	4:31
2.	"Seven Years Gone"	4:40
3.	"Good Time Rock N Roll"	2:34
4.	"Master & Dog"	4:11
5.	"Drunken Tears"	3:23
6.	"Sunshine Sounds"	7:10
7.	"Mama Tried"	3:41
8.	"No One"	5:07
9.	"White Devil's Dream"	3:00
10.	"Good Times"	3:47
11.	"Lullaby, Pt. 2"	2:04

== "Live Shit" bonus CD ==
This CD was included in early copies of the American Touch and Go Records release as well as (so far) all copies of the European Domino Recording Company release.

No.	Title	Length
1.	"Intro"	3:18
2.	"When I'm Dead"	1:55
3.	"Seal the Deal"	4:05
4.	"Goblins & Trolls"	2:56
5.	"Mama Tried"	3:27
6.	"I Never Want to See You Again"	3:43
7.	"Genetic Science"	3:21
8.	"Under a Cloud"	2:30
9.	"A Case of No Way Out"	5:10
10.	"Our Happiness Is Guaranteed"	3:15
11.	"Master & Dog"	3:33
12.	"Nothing from Nothing"	3:10
13.	"Good Time Rock N Roll"	2:25
14.	"Sea Shanty"	4:41
15.	"Sword of God"	4:41
16.	"Birds"	2:59
17.	"It's Raining"	3:00
18.	"I Give Up"	2:59
19.	"No One"	4:27

== Personnel ==
- Sam Coomes – vocals, guitars, keyboards
- Janet Weiss – vocals, drums
- Quasi – production
- Strings on "Drunken Tears," "Good Times," and "Lullaby Pt. 2." by:
  - Brent Arnold – cello, string arrangements
  - Ollie Glatzen – viola
- Roger Seibel – mastering
