= Middle America (song) =

Single by Stephen Malkmus and the Jicks

from the album Sparkle Hard
- Released: February 7, 2018
- Length: 3:31
- Label: Matador; Domino
- Songwriter: Stephen Malkmus
- Producer: Chris Funk

Stephen Malkmus and the Jicks singles chronology
"Middle America" (2018)	"Shiggy" (2018)

"Middle America" is a song by American rock band Stephen Malkmus and the Jicks. It is the fifth track and first single from their seventh studio album, Sparkle Hard, and was released as a digital single on February 7, 2018 by Matador Records and Domino Records.

== Composition and lyrics ==
Described as an "ode to underdogs everywhere", the song features lyrics concerning the passage of time and aging contrasted with smaller concepts of getting "shitfaced" and blushing the color of Robitussin. The song also features the lyric "Men are scum, I won’t deny", which has been interpreted as a reference to the #MeToo movement. Writing for Paste Magazine, Scott Russell compared the song's folksy, sunny sound and existential lyrics to that of "Range Life" by Pavement.

In an interview with Stereogum, Malkmus explained the song's title: "I have no judgments on middle America. That was a working title, I just kinda kept it." Stereogum interpreted the title and the song itself as engaging with the "ennui of the flyover states."

== Music video ==
A music video for an acoustic version of the song was released on March 7, 2018. Directed by Brook Linder, it consists solely of Stephen Malkmus sitting in an alcove in front of a windowpane and surrounded by houseplants, strumming an acoustic guitar and singing. The video's simplicity was praised by Pitchfork, who included it in their list of best music videos of March 2018.

== Critical reception ==
Pitchfork praised "Middle America" and awarded it Best New Track upon its release. Sasha Geffen stated: "Malkmus and the Jicks' new song, “Middle America,” fully exploits their frontman's ability to hook his voice around an irresistible melody, then another, then another. Any of the vocal bars from “Middle America” could be another song's sole refrain, but Malkmus links them all together like he’ll never have to worry about running out of catchy moments—like he produces them effortlessly, in abundance."

Jon Dolan of Rolling Stone called the song the "sweetest moment" of Sparkle Hard, writing, "It’s Malkmus at his most straightforwardly graceful, strumming a folkie melody like a guy in his backyard figuring life out at his own easeful pace, balancing everyday worry (“time gets me and I wonder how to simplify”) with goofy sweet nothings (“kiss yourself metaphorically”), capping it off with a aphoristic #metoo toast: “Men are scum, I can’t deny/May you be shitfaced the day you die.” Words to live by for sure."

Writing for The Guardian, Dave Simpson called the song one of Malkmus' "sweetest melodies".

=== Year-end lists ===
Publication	Rank	List
The Line of Best Fit	44	The Fifty Best Songs of 2018
Pitchfork	24	The 100 Best Songs of 2018
Rolling Stone	7	Rob Sheffield's Top 25 Songs of 2018
