= Featuring "Birds" =

Studio album by Quasi
- Released: April 21, 1998
- Recorded: November 1997
- Studios: Jackpot!, Portland, Oregon, United States
- Genres: Indie rock; electropop; garage rock
- Length: 46:42
- Labels: Up (US), Domino (UK)
- Producers: Joanna Bolme; Charlie Campbell; Sam Coomes; Larry Crane; Tony Lash; Dave Livingston; Chris Slusarenko; Elliott Smith; Chris Takino; Janet Weiss; Julie Weiss

Quasi chronology
| R&B Transmogrification (1997) | Featuring "Birds" (1998) | Field Studies (1999) |

Featuring "Birds" is the third studio album by the American indie rock band Quasi. It was released in 1998 by record label Up in the US and Domino in the UK.

Several of the album's tracks were first created during sessions for Quasi's previous album, R&B Transmogrification (1997).

== Background and recording ==
Featuring "Birds" was recorded during November 1997 at Jackpot! Recording Studios in Portland, Oregon.

== Release ==
Featuring "Birds" was released on April 21, 1998, through the labels Up in the US and Domino in the UK.

== Critical reception ==
Professional ratings
Review scores
| Source | Rating |
|---|---|
| AllMusic | 4/5 stars |
| Mojo | 4/5 stars |
| NME | 8/10 |
| Pitchfork | 8.6/10 |
| Rolling Stone | 3/5 stars |
| The Rolling Stone Album Guide | 4/5 stars |
| Spin | 8/10 |
| Uncut | 8/10 |
| The Village Voice | A− |

Featuring "Birds" has been well received by critics.

Sean Kennerly of Rolling Stone wrote: "[the album] hides gut-wrenching heartache and despair inside sugary vocal harmonies and catchy, succinct songwriting. [...] Bitterness has never sounded so sweet." The album placed at number twenty-five on The Village Voice's 1998 end-of-year Pazz & Jop poll.

== Track listing ==
All tracks are written by Sam Coomes, except "Tomorrow You'll Hide", written by Janet Weiss.

| No. | Title | Length |
|---|---|---|
| 1. | "Our Happiness Is Guaranteed" | 3:15 |
| 2. | "I Never Want to See You Again" | 3:48 |
| 3. | "The Poisoned Well" | 2:08 |
| 4. | "The Happy Prole" | 1:42 |
| 5. | "Sea Shanty" | 4:08 |
| 6. | "It's Hard to Turn Me On" | 4:33 |
| 7. | "Nothing from Nothing" | 2:44 |
| 8. | "Tomorrow You'll Hide" | 2:20 |
| 9. | "California" | 2:04 |
| 10. | "You Fucked Yourself" | 2:36 |
| 11. | "Ape Self Prevails in Me Still" | 2:12 |
| 12. | "Please Do" | 2:58 |
| 13. | "I Give Up" | 2:54 |
| 14. | "Birds" | 1:21 |
| 15. | "Repetition" | 5:05 |
| 16. | "Only Success Can Fail Me Now" | 2:53 |

== Personnel ==
- Sam Coomes – vocals, guitar, Rocksichord, keyboards
- Janet Weiss – vocals, drums
- Charlie Campbell – orchestral guitar on "Tomorrow You'll Hide", executive producer
- Quasi – production
- Joanna Bolme – executive producer
- Larry Crane – recording engineer, executive producer
- Tony Lash – executive producer, mastering
- Dave Livingston – executive producer
- Kathy Malloy – executive producer
- Chris Slusarenko – executive producer
- Elliott Smith – executive producer
- Chris Takino – executive producer
- Julie Weiss – executive producer
