= Sparkle Hard =

Studio album by Stephen Malkmus and the Jicks
- Released: May 18, 2018
- Studio: Halfling Studios, Portland, Oregon
- Genre: Indie rock
- Length: 43:41
- Label: Matador; Domino
- Producer: Chris Funk

Stephen Malkmus and the Jicks chronology
Wig Out at Jagbags (2014)	Sparkle Hard (2018)

Singles from Sparkle Hard
- 1. "Middle America" Released: February 7, 2018; 2. "Shiggy" Released: March 26, 2018; 3. "Refute" Released: April 25, 2018

Sparkle Hard is the seventh studio album by American indie rock band Stephen Malkmus and the Jicks, released on May 18, 2018, by Matador Records and Domino Records. It reached #174 on the Billboard 200 charts, and peaked at #64 on the Official UK Charts.

== Critical reception ==
Professional ratings
Aggregate scores
Source	Rating
AnyDecentMusic?	7.9/10
Metacritic	84/100
Review scores
Source	Rating
AllMusic	4.5/5 stars
The A.V. Club	B+
Financial Times	4/5 stars
The Guardian	4/5 stars
Mojo	4/5 stars
The Observer	4/5 stars
Pitchfork	8.0/10
Q	4/5 stars
Rolling Stone	3.5/5 stars
Uncut	8/10

Sparkle Hard was critically acclaimed upon its release. At Metacritic, which assigns a normalized rating out of 100 to reviews from mainstream publications, it received an average score of 84, based on 26 reviews. Jem Aswad of Variety said that "With nary a weak track, Sparkle Hard finds Malkmus hitting a new peak nearly 30 years into his career."

Several publications named the album one of the best of 2018, including: Rolling Stone, Spin, Q, Uncut, Mojo, Under the Radar, and Consequence of Sound.

== Track listing ==
All tracks are written by Stephen Malkmus.

No.	Title	Length
1.	"Cast Off"	2:54
2.	"Future Suite"	2:43
3.	"Solid Silk"	4:37
4.	"Bike Lane"	3:34
5.	"Middle America"	3:31
6.	"Rattler"	3:08
7.	"Shiggy"	3:16
8.	"Kite"	6:40
9.	"Brethren"	2:51
10.	"Refute"	3:24
11.	"Difficulties / Let Them Eat Vowels"	7:03
Total length:		43:41

== Personnel ==
- Stephen Malkmus – vocals, songwriting, guitar, mellotron, piano, Memorymoog, bass
- Joanna Bolme – bass, backing vocals
- Mike Clark – keyboards, JUNO synthesizer
- Jake Morris – drums, backing vocals, percussion
- Chris Funk – production, acoustic slide guitar (10)
- Kim Gordon – vocals (10)
- Kyleen King – strings (3, 9)
- Luke Price – fiddle (10)
- JJ Golden – lacquer cut
- Adam Lee – recording, mixing
- Orion Landau – design
- James Rexroad – photography
