= When the Going Gets Dark =

Studio album by Quasi
- Released: March 21, 2006
- Genre: Indie rock
- Length: 42:48
- Label: Touch & Go; Domino Records (Europe)

Quasi chronology
Hot Shit! (2003)	When the Going Gets Dark (2006)	Quasi Self Boot 93–96 (2006)

Professional ratings
Aggregate scores
Source	Rating
Metacritic	74/100
Review scores
Source	Rating
AllMusic	4/5 stars
Pitchfork Media	7.0/10
Tiny Mix Tapes	3.5/5 stars

When the Going Gets Dark is an album by Quasi. It was released on March 21, 2006, on Touch and Go Records. It was released in Europe by Domino Records.

== Track listing ==
No.	Title	Length
1.	"Alice the Goon"	4:15
2.	"The Rhino"	2:35
3.	"When the Going Gets Dark"	4:05
4.	"I Don't Know You Anymore"	2:59
5.	"Peace and Love"	2:44
6.	"Beyond the Sky"	4:02
7.	"Presto Change-O"	3:08
8.	"Poverty Sucks"	3:23
9.	"Merry X-Mas"	5:42
10.	"Death Culture Blues"	4:51
11.	"Invisible Star"	5:05

== Personnel ==
- Sam Coomes – guitar, vocals
- Janet Weiss – drums, vocals
- Dave Fridmann – mixing, producer
- Jacob Hall – recording engineer
- Steven Wray Lobdell – recording engineer
- William McCurtin – cover painting
- Roger Seibel – mastering
- Kendra Wright – recording engineer
