= Mirror Traffic =

Studio album by Stephen Malkmus and the Jicks
- Released: August 23, 2011
- Genre: Indie rock; alternative rock
- Length: 50:35
- Label: Matador (U.S.); Domino (U.K.)
- Producer: Beck

Stephen Malkmus and the Jicks chronology
Real Emotional Trash (2008)	Mirror Traffic (2011)	Wig Out at Jagbags (2014)

Mirror Traffic is the fifth studio album by Stephen Malkmus and the Jicks, released on August 23, 2011, by Matador Records. It is the first collaboration between Stephen Malkmus and producer Beck and also the last album to feature drummer Janet Weiss, who moved on to become a member of Wild Flag. As of November 2013, the album has sold 30,000 copies in the U.S. according to Nielsen SoundScan.

== Critical response ==
Professional ratings
Aggregate scores
Source	Rating
AnyDecentMusic?	7.6/10
Metacritic	80/100
Review scores
Source	Rating
AllMusic	4.5/5 stars
The A.V. Club	B−
Entertainment Weekly	B+
The Guardian	4/5 stars
Los Angeles Times	3.5/4 stars
NME	7/10
Pitchfork	7.7/10
Q	4/5 stars
Rolling Stone	3.5/5 stars
Spin	8/10

Mirror Traffic has received positive reviews. Spin called it "a patient, inviting album that feels like a fresh start from a guy whose recording career spans multiple boom-and-bust cycles, both for indie rock and the economy."

== Track listing ==
All tracks are written by Stephen Malkmus.

No.	Title	Length
1.	"Tigers"	2:24
2.	"No One Is (As I Are Be)"	3:58
3.	"Senator"	4:25
4.	"Brain Gallop"	5:02
5.	"Jumblegloss"	1:13
6.	"Asking Price"	2:41
7.	"Stick Figures in Love"	3:45
8.	"Spazz"	2:38
9.	"Long Hard Book"	2:48
10.	"Share the Red"	5:19
11.	"Tune Grief"	2:19
12.	"Forever 28"	3:35
13.	"All Over Gently"	3:10
14.	"Fall Away"	2:18
15.	"Gorgeous Georgie"	5:00
Total length:		50:35
