= Wig Out at Jagbags =

Studio album by Stephen Malkmus and the Jicks
- Released: January 7, 2014
- Genre: Indie rock
- Length: 41:34
- Label: Matador (U.S.); Domino (U.K.)
- Producer: Remko Schouten

Stephen Malkmus and the Jicks chronology
| Mirror Traffic (2011) | Wig Out at Jagbags (2014) | Sparkle Hard (2018) |

Wig Out at Jagbags is the sixth studio album by American rock band Stephen Malkmus and the Jicks. It was released on January 7, 2014, by Matador Records.

== Title ==
The album's name is a reference to Wig Out at Denko's, the second long-player by Dag Nasty, and according to press interview on BBC Radio 1 with Lauren Laverne references a night out at London venue DreamBags JaguarShoes which is referred to locally by its patrons as 'JagBags'. Malkmus has also stated it is a Chicago term he read at a fantasy basketball message board. Malkmus has said he found both funny.

== Critical response ==
Professional ratings
Aggregate scores
| Source | Rating |
|---|---|
| AnyDecentMusic? | 7.1/10 |
| Metacritic | 74/100 |
Review scores
| Source | Rating |
| AllMusic | 4.5/5 stars |
| The A.V. Club | B |
| The Guardian | 3/5 stars |
| Mojo | 4/5 stars |
| NME | 7/10 |
| Pitchfork | 7.0/10 |
| Q | 3/5 stars |
| Rolling Stone | 4/5 stars |
| Spin | 7/10 |
| Uncut | 8/10 |

Upon initial release the album generally received positive reviews, attaining an aggregated score of 74 out of 100 on Metacritic. At Alternative Press, Jeff Rosenstock wrote that although "[f]earlessly skating all over the landscape of American rock music could lead lesser bands into a confusing disconnected record", the album "is full of so much life and melody that it stands as a refreshing alternative to the increasingly homogeneous state of indie rock."

== Track listing ==
1. "Planetary Motion" - 3:05
2. "The Janitor Revealed" - 3:36
3. "Lariat" - 3:06
4. "Houston Hades" - 4:47
5. "Shibboleth" - 2:45
6. "J Smoov" - 5:07
7. "Rumble at the Rainbo" - 1:42
8. "Chartjunk" - 3:50
9. "Independence Street" - 3:01
10. "Scattegories" - 1:54
11. "Cinnamon and Lesbians" - 3:02
12. "Surreal Teenagers" - 5:39
