= Pig Lib =

Studio album by Stephen Malkmus and the Jicks
- Released: March 18, 2003
- Recorded: February 10, 2001 – August 2002
- Studio: • Bear Creek Studio, Woodinville, WA; • Jackpot, PDX; • Malmö, Sweden; • Melbourne, Australia
- Genre: Indie rock
- Length: 47:30
- Label: Matador
- Producer: Ryan Hadlock

Stephen Malkmus and the Jicks chronology
Stephen Malkmus (2001)	Pig Lib (2003)	Face the Truth (2005)

Pig Lib is the second studio album by Stephen Malkmus and the Jicks, released on March 18, 2003, by Matador Records. It peaked at No. 97 in the U.S. and No. 63 in the UK. The first pressing of the record came with a bonus disc containing five additional new songs. As of June 2004, the album has sold 49,000 copies in the U.S. according to Nielsen SoundScan.

== Critical reception ==
Professional ratings
Aggregate scores
Source	Rating
Metacritic	80/100
Review scores
Source	Rating
AllMusic	3/5 stars
Blender	4/5 stars
Entertainment Weekly	A−
The Guardian	4/5 stars
Mojo	4/5 stars
Pitchfork	8.0/10
Q	3/5 stars
Rolling Stone	4/5 stars
Spin	A
Uncut	4/5 stars

Pig Lib received generally positive reviews from music critics. Christian Hoard, writing for Rolling Stone, described the album as "Malkmus' loosest set of songs ever, an elegantly meandering head trip underpinned by the kind of tuneful, world-wise romanticism that's won him the hearts of English majors everywhere".

== Track listing ==
1. "Water and a Seat" – 4:18
2. "Ramp of Death" – 2:37
3. "(Do Not Feed the) Oyster" – 4:49
4. "Vanessa from Queens" – 3:21
5. "Sheets" – 3:19
6. "Animal Midnight" – 5:11
7. "Dark Wave" – 2:26
8. "Witch Mountain Bridge" – 5:21
9. "Craw Song" – 2:41
10. "1% of One" – 9:11
11. "Us" – 4:16

=== Bonus disc ===
1. "Dynamic Calories" – 2:23
2. "Fractions & Feelings" – 3:28
3. "Old Jerry" – 6:18
4. "The Poet and the Witch" (live) – 2:05
5. "Shake It Around" (live) – 4:04

"The Poet and the Witch" is a Mellow Candle cover.

"Shake It Around" is an otherwise unreleased original.
