= Quasi (band) =

American indie rock band

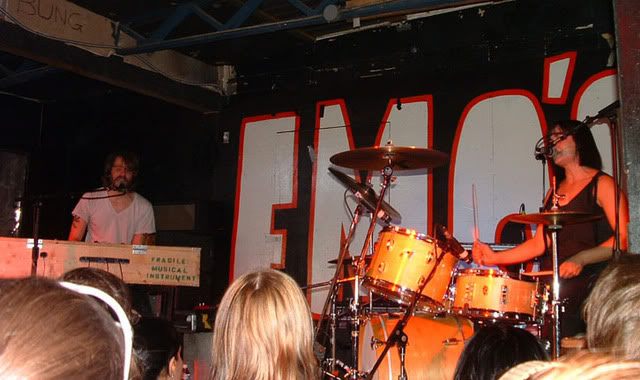
- Quasi performing at SXSW in Austin, TX, 2003

Background information
- Origin: Portland, Oregon, U.S.
- Genres: Indie rock; indie pop; electronic rock
- Years active: 1993–present
- Labels: Kill Rock Stars; Domino; Touch and Go; Up; Key Op; Sub Pop
- Members: Sam Coomes; Janet Weiss
- Past members: Joanna Bolme
- Website: theequasi.bandcamp.com

Quasi /ˈkwɑː.zi/ is an American indie rock band formed in Portland, Oregon in 1993 by former spouses Sam Coomes (vocals, guitar, rocksichord, various keyboards, bass) and Janet Weiss (vocals and drums). Joanna Bolme performed and recorded with the group as a bassist from 2007 to 2011.

== History ==
In 1990, Sam Coomes, Janet Weiss, and Brad Pedinov formed the band Motorgoat. The band released two self-released cassettes and one 7" single before dissolving in 1993. Coomes and Weiss then began recording as a duo in 1993 under the name Quasi. They played with various additional musicians in early live appearances, but eventually settled on playing live as a duo as well. They self-recorded and self-released a cassette and a CD in 1993. They recorded R&B Transmogrification in the Portland band Pond's basement recording studio and released it on Up Records in 1997. They released two more albums with Up: Featuring "Birds" in 1998 and Field Studies in 1999; both albums were recorded at Jackpot! Studios in Portland, Oregon.

In 1998 and 1999, they toured the United States, Europe, Australia, and Japan opening for and serving as the backup band for Elliott Smith (with whom Coomes had played in Heatmiser) as well as touring on their own in the U.S. and Europe. In 2001, they home-recorded The Sword of God and released it on Touch & Go. They released Hot Shit! in 2003 and When the Going Gets Dark in 2006, both on Touch & Go in the U.S. and Domino Recording Company in Europe. In 2009, the band signed with Kill Rock Stars to release their next record.

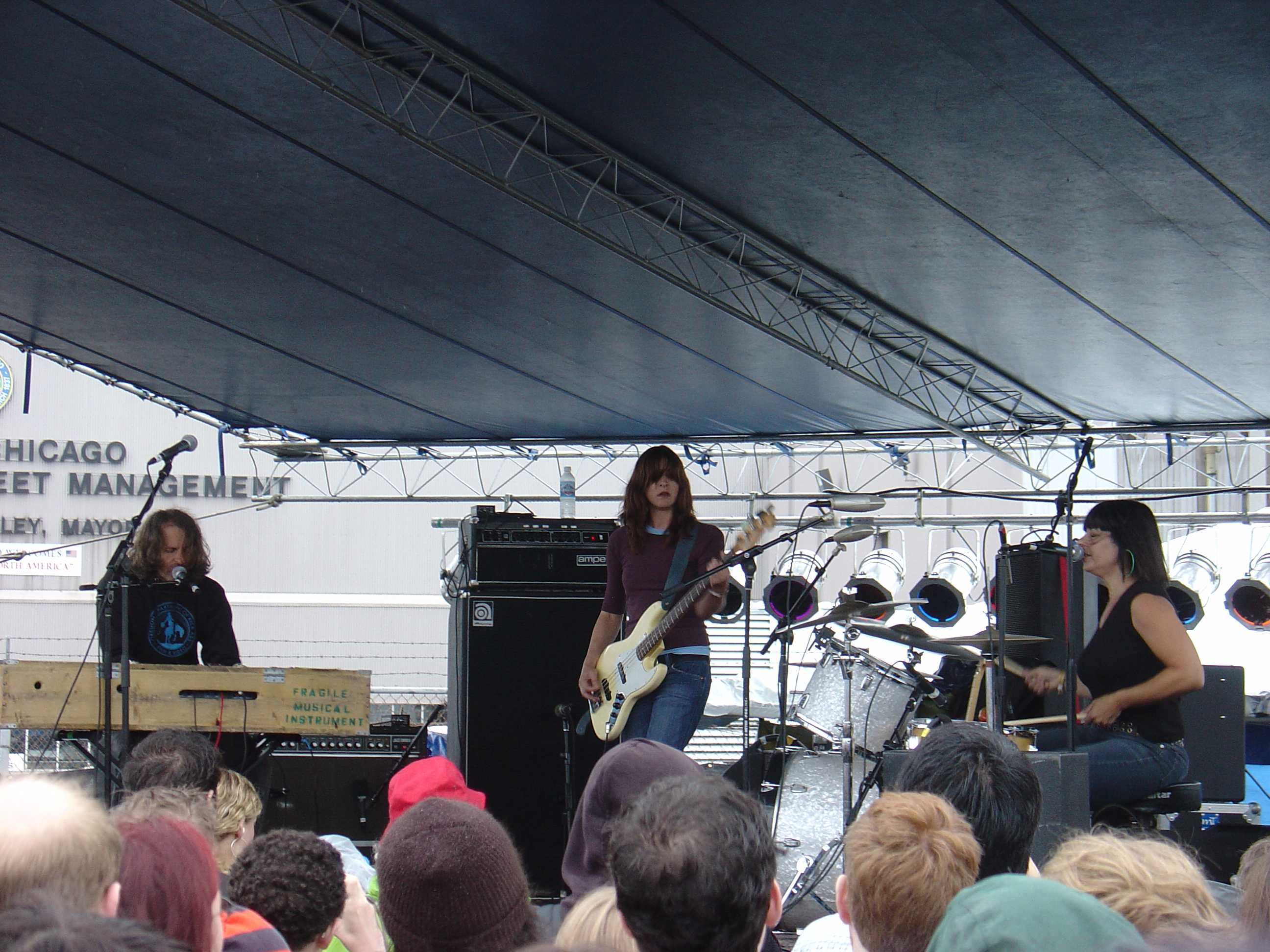
Quasi on stage in Chicago with Joanna Bolme in 2006

Although Coomes and Weiss remain busy with other bands, Quasi tours fairly regularly. In 2007, they toured the U.S. with Touch & Go labelmates Ted Leo and the Pharmacists. Just prior to that tour, Quasi announced that bassist Joanna Bolme, who had toured with Quasi in 2006 and plays with Weiss in Stephen Malkmus and the Jicks, was a permanent member of the band. Bolme performed on Quasi's 2010 full-length American Gong and continued to tour with them through the first half of 2011. In June 2011, Quasi posted an update on their official Facebook page, announcing that they would be returning to their original two-piece lineup for "the foreseeable future" and thanking Bolme for her time with the band. They released their next album, Mole City, in 2013.

In addition to her work in the Jicks, Weiss was the primary drummer for the group Sleater-Kinney, and has recently played with Bright Eyes, John Doe and Wild Flag, while Coomes has been working with Pink Mountain and on his solo project, Blues Goblins. He has also played with Jandek, and has appeared on several Built to Spill albums.

The group reactivated in 2020 with a one-off release via Bandcamp. In February 2023, Quasi released their 10th studio record, Breaking the Balls of History on Sub Pop. In 2024, they toured as a 3-piece band again, playing their album Featuring "Birds" in full.

== Discography ==
=== Albums ===
- Quasi (cassette) (1993, self-released)
- R&B Transmogrification (1997, Up)
- Featuring "Birds" (1998, Up / Domino)
- Field Studies (1999, Up / Domino)
- The Sword of God (2001, Touch & Go / Domino)
- Hot Shit! (2003, Touch & Go / Domino)
- When the Going Gets Dark (2006, Touch & Go / Domino)
- American Gong (2010, Kill Rock Stars / Domino)
- Mole City (2013, Kill Rock Stars / Domino)
- Breaking the Balls of History (2023, Sub Pop)

=== EPs and singles ===
- Split 7" with Bugskull (1994)
- Kill Rock Stars Singles Club 7" (1998, Kill Rock Stars)
- "The Poisoned Well" b/w "California" (1998)
- Split 7" with Mars Accelerator and Space Pants (2000)
- "The Sword of God" (2001)
- Tour 7" (2001)
- Hot Shit Tour CD (2003)
- Interprets (2013, Kill Rock Stars / Domino) – covers EP released both as a standalone EP and with pre-orders of Kill Rock Stars' limited edition colored 2-LP version of Mole City; includes covers of Queen's "Don't Stop Me Now", Black Sabbath's "War Pigs", Marvin Gaye's "Let's Get It On", and Nick Lowe's "(What's So Funny About) Peace, Love & Understanding"

=== Compilations ===
- Early Recordings (1996, Key Op; 2001, Touch & Go)
- Crash Course for the Ravers: A Tribute to the Songs of David Bowie (1996, Undercover Records) – song: "Sound and Vision"
- Colonel Jeffrey Pumpernickel: A Concept Album (2001, Off Records) – song: "Which Side Are You On, Colonel?"
- Fields and Streams (2002, Kill Rock Stars) – song: "Queen Majesty"
- Live Shit (2003, Touch & Go / Domino) – included with some versions of Hot Shit!
- PDX Pop Now! 2004 (2004, PDX Pop Now!) – song: "23 & 24"
- Quasi Self Boot 93-96 (2006, self-released) – tour-only release
- Score! 20 Years of Merge Records: The Covers! (2009, Merge Records) – song: "Beautiful Things" (The 3Ds cover)
- So Far So Good: A Quasi Anthology (2010, Kill Rock Stars) – released as part of the deluxe 2-CD edition of American Gong
- Comfort & Joy: A Holiday Compilation Benefiting Homeless Youth (2013, Analog Ghost Recordings) – song: "Christmas on Credit"
- Battle Hymns (2017, self-released) – song: "Ballad of Donald Duck & Elmer Fudd"
