= Stephen Malkmus and the Jicks =

American rock band

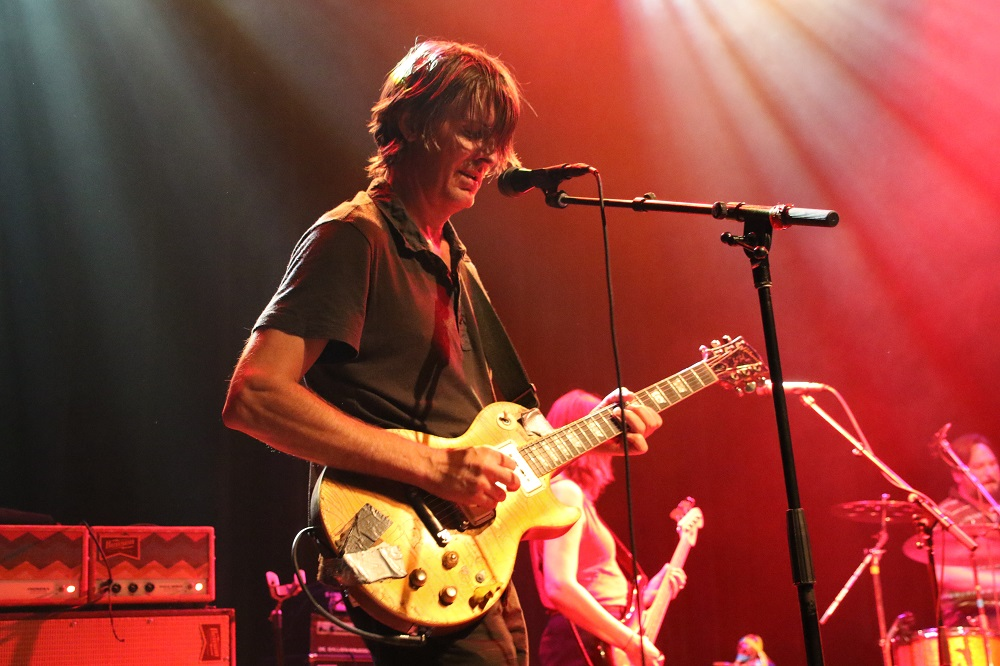
- Malkmus performing with The Jicks in 2018

Background information
- Origin: Portland, Oregon, U.S.
- Genre: Indie rock
- Years active: 2000–present
- Labels: Matador Records, Arts & Crafts, Domino Recording Company
- Members: Stephen Malkmus, Joanna Bolme, Mike Clark & Jake Morris
- Past members: John Moen; Janet Weiss; Joe 'Plumdog' Plummer
- Website: www.stephenmalkmus.com

Stephen Malkmus and the Jicks is an American rock band consisting of Stephen Malkmus, Mike Clark, Joanna Bolme and Jake Morris. Malkmus is the main singer and songwriter behind the influential 1990s indie rock band Pavement.

== History ==
The Jicks formed in 2000, almost immediately after Pavement's 1999 "hiatus" began. The group's first record - which had a working title of Swedish Reggae - was simply called Stephen Malkmus. It was released by Matador Records on February 13, 2001.

The group made their official live debut at New York's Bowery Ballroom only a few weeks before their first record was released. Around this time, Pavement's auxiliary percussionist Bob Nastanovich began acting as The Jicks' tour manager, and Mike Clark joined on keyboards.

Pig Lib, the name of the band's second record, was released in 2003 and featured a looser interplay between the musicians with longer song lengths and a growing emphasis on guitar solos. The album received positive reviews, gaining 4/5 stars from Rolling Stone and an 8.0/10 from Pitchfork Media. In 2003 the Jicks opened for Radiohead on their North American tour, and in 2004 the band helped to curate an edition of the British All Tomorrow's Parties festival.

The band released Face the Truth in 2005 to widely positive reviews, many of them claiming a return to Wowee Zowee-type form. Most of the album was recorded by Malkmus alone in his basement, although each member of the Jicks play on at least one song on the record. The band toured minimally for this record, partially due to the fact that Malkmus had a new child. During this time period Joe Plummer briefly filled in on drums.

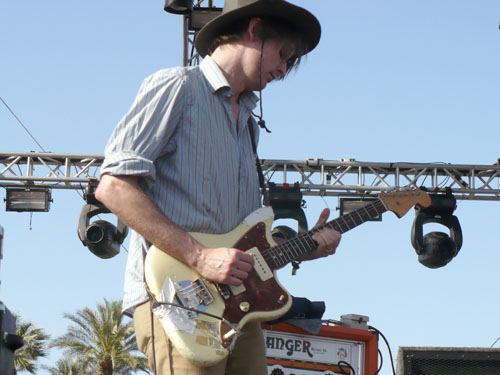
Malkmus performing with The Jicks in 2006

On October 2, 2006, it was reported by Pitchfork that John Moen had become a full-time member of The Decemberists and had been replaced by Janet Weiss - drummer of Quasi and the then-defunct Sleater-Kinney. The band's fourth studio album, Real Emotional Trash, was recorded at SnowGhost Music in Whitefish, Montana, and released on March 4, 2008 to generally positive reviews. While Malkmus spent much of 2010 on tour with Pavement, the band completed recording on their fifth album Mirror Traffic with Beck. Prior to the release, Janet Weiss' departure from the Jicks lineup was announced. Her place was taken by ex-Joggers drummer Jake Morris.

The band's sixth studio album, Wig Out at Jagbags, was released on January 7, 2014. It was recorded in the La Chapelle studio in Belgium with Pavement's F.O.H. live sound engineer Remko 'El Duche' Schouten. Overdubs were done in Berlin where Stephen lived from 2012 until 2014 with his family. The album was mixed in Amsterdam's IJland Studio.

On March 26, 2018, it was announced that the band's seventh studio album, Sparkle Hard would be released on May 18, 2018.

For much of the band's existence, the Jicks did not regularly perform songs by Malkmus's previous band Pavement. However, since about 2012, the group has shown a greater willingness to occasionally play Pavement songs (generally one or two per show). Commonly played Pavement songs in later Jicks performances have included "In the Mouth a Desert", "Shady Lane", "Box Elder", and "Stereo" among others.

== Members ==
Current members

- Stephen Malkmus - vocals, guitar (2000–present)
- Joanna Bolme - bass, vocals, synthesizer (2000–present)
- Mike Clark - keyboards, synthesizer, guitar (2001–present)
- Jake Morris - drums (2011–present)

Former members

- John Moen - drums, percussion, vocals (2000–2005, 2005–2006)
- Joe Plummer - drums (2005)
- Janet Weiss - drums (2006–2011)

== Discography ==
=== Studio albums ===
- Stephen Malkmus (2001)
- Pig Lib (2003)
- Face the Truth (2005)
- Real Emotional Trash (2008)
- Mirror Traffic (2011)
- Wig Out at Jagbags (2014)
- Sparkle Hard (2018)

=== Singles ===
- "Phantasies" (2001)
- "Discretion Grove" (2001)
- "Jenny & the Ess-Dog" (2001)
- "Jo Jo's Jacket" (2001)
- "Dark Wave" (2003) (repeat of bonus disc that accompanied Pig Lib's first pressing)
- "Baby C'mon" (2005)
- "Kindling for the Master" (2006) (remix EP)
- "Baltimore" (2008)
- "Gardenia" (2008)
- "Cold Son" (2008)
- "Tigers" (2011)
- "Senator" (2011) (contains radio edit & album version)
- "Stick Figures in Love" (2012)
- "Gorgeous Georgie" b/w "Wheels of Fire" (2012) (split single with L.A. Guns)
- "Lariat" (2013)
- "Middle America" (2018)
- "Shiggy" (2018)
- "Refute" (2018)
