= Face the Truth (Stephen Malkmus album) =

Studio album by Stephen Malkmus
- Released: May 23, 2005
- Recorded: Summer 2004 – Spring 2005
- Genre: Rock
- Length: 43:29
- Label: Matador (U.S.); Domino (UK)
- Producer: Stephen Malkmus

Stephen Malkmus chronology
Pig Lib (2003)	Face the Truth (2005)	Real Emotional Trash (2008)

Professional ratings
Aggregate scores
Source	Rating
Metacritic	78/100
Review scores
Source	Rating
AllMusic	4/5 stars
Blender	4/5 stars
Entertainment Weekly	B+
The Guardian	3/5 stars
NME	5/10
Pitchfork	8.7/10
Rolling Stone	3.5/5 stars
Spin	B
Uncut	4/5 stars
The Village Voice	B+

Face the Truth is the third solo album by Stephen Malkmus, released on May 23, 2005, in the UK and May 24, 2005, in the US.

Although not formally credited as a Jicks record, much like the earlier self-titled record, each member of the band is featured on at least one track of the album, and "& The Jicks" is written on the back of the sleeve.

Prior to its release, the album title was rumored to be Hamburger Serenade. Malkmus discounted those online rumors and said the album was always leaning toward the title it was given.

== Track listing ==
1. "Pencil Rot" – 4:08
2. "It Kills" – 4:39
3. "I've Hardly Been" – 2:56
4. "Freeze the Saints" – 3:54
5. "Loud Cloud Crowd" – 3:32
6. "No More Shoes" – 8:00
7. "Mama" – 3:11
8. "Kindling for the Master" – 3:20
9. "Post-Paint Boy" – 4:08
10. "Baby C'mon" – 2:44
11. "Malediction" – 2:50

Bonus tracks

12. "Wow-Ass Jeans" - 3:13
