= Sam Coomes =

American musician (born 1964)

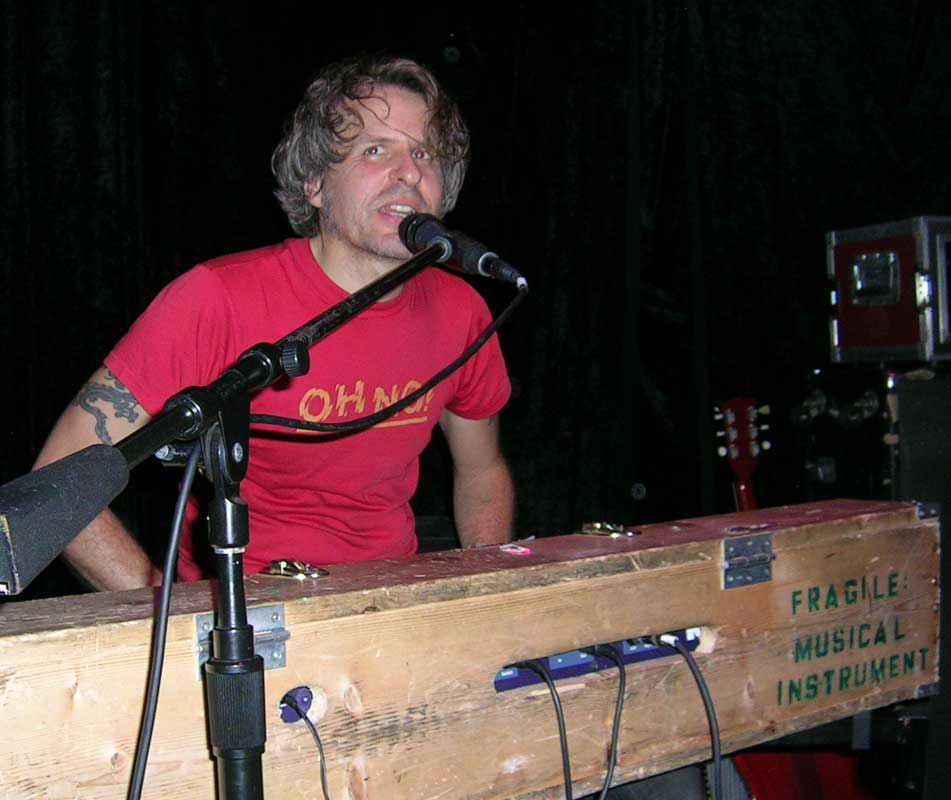
- Sam Coomes on stage with Quasi at the Rickshaw Stop, San Francisco, California, February 27, 2008.

Background information
- Also known as: Blues Goblins
- Born: April 23, 1964 (age 62); Sherman, Texas, U.S.
- Origin: Portland, Oregon, U.S.
- Genre: Indie rock
- Occupation: Musician
- Instruments: Bass guitar, guitar, keyboards
- Years active: 1983–present

Samuel J. Coomes (born April 23, 1964) is an American musician, and one half of the indie band Quasi, along with his ex-wife, drummer Janet Weiss. Coomes was also a member of the mid-1980s underground pop band The Donner Party and replaced Brandt Peterson as the bassist for the 1990s Portland indie rock band Heatmiser, playing on their final studio album, Mic City Sons.

== Biography ==
Coomes was born in Sherman, Texas, and moved to Southern California as a child. He started playing in The Donner Party in San Francisco in 1983 and released two albums with them before they disbanded in 1989. Coomes formed Motorgoat in Portland, Oregon, in 1990 with Janet Weiss, and they released two cassettes and one 7" single before disbanding and becoming Quasi in 1993. Coomes released a solo album under the name Blues Goblins in 2003 and sometimes performs under that name. He also performs on keyboards and vocals with the Oakland, California-based band Pink Mountain, and formed the duo Crock with Spencer Seim (Hella, Solos, The Advantage) which released an album, Grok, in 2011. Coomes also appeared with Jandek in two NW shows along with drummer Emil Amos (Om, Grails, Holy Sons), documented on the album Portland Thursday (2009) and Seattle Friday (2011). Additionally, Coomes has scored several of the films of underground filmmaker Rankin Renwick (formerly known as Vanessa Renwick) Coomes currently lives in Portland, Oregon.

== Session work since inception of Quasi ==
Coomes has done much recording work with other bands, mostly on keyboards and bass.

- Bugskull
- Built to Spill - Coomes has performed as a guest keyboardist on several tracks. He has appeared on every Built to Spill album since Keep It Like a Secret. In addition, he co-produced with Doug Martsch Built to Spill's 2015 album, Untethered Moon
- The Go-Betweens
- Goldcard
- Heatmiser
- Sleater-Kinney - Coomes played the Mellotron on All Hands on the Bad One on the song "Milkshake 'n' Honey." He also played the theremin on the song "Funeral Song" off the album One Beat.
- Elliott Smith - Coomes played bass on the 2000 album Figure 8 on the songs "Stupidity Tries", "Everything Means Nothing to Me", "In the Lost and Found (Honky Bach)," and "Pretty Mary K". He also played bass and sang backup vocals on Elliott Smith's song "Pretty (Ugly Before)" on Smith's posthumous 2004 album From a Basement on the Hill. Quasi and Elliott Smith toured together, including during the tour in support of his major-label debut, XO. During these tour dates, Quasi performed a set of their own with Smith joining them for some songs, and also backed Smith on some songs during his set.
- The Takeovers
- Jandek

== Solo discography ==
=== Albums ===
Title	Release date	Label
Bugger Me	2016	Domino / No Quarter
True Death	2020	No label

=== Compilation appearances ===
- The Portland Edition — American Leather Records (vinyl, 2017)
