= Elliott Smith discography =

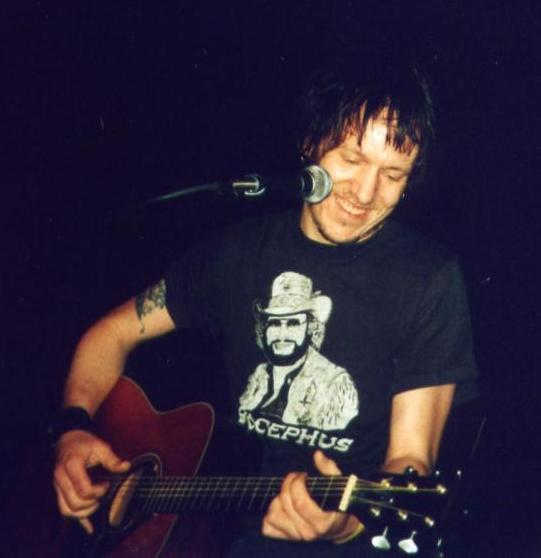
- Elliott Smith performing in 2003
- Studio albums: 6
- Live albums: 1
- Compilation albums: 2
- Singles: 11
- Music videos: 4
- Contributions: 23

The discography of Elliott Smith, an American singer-songwriter, consists of six studio albums, one live album, two compilation albums and eleven singles.

== Albums ==
=== Studio albums ===
List of studio albums, with chart positions
Title	Album details	Peak chart positions							Certifications
Title	Album details	US	AUS	FRA	IRL	NOR	SWE	UK	Certifications
Roman Candle	Released: July 14, 1994; Labels: Cavity Search (CSR13), Domino (REWIG 2), Kill Rock Stars (KRS-523); Formats: CD, CS, LP	—	—	—	—	—	—	—	
Elliott Smith	Released: July 21, 1995; Labels: Kill Rock Stars (KRS 246), Domino (REWIG1); Formats: CD, LP	—	—	—	—	—	—	—	
Either/Or	Released: February 25, 1997; Labels: Kill Rock Stars (KRS 269), Domino (WIG 51); Formats: CD, LP	—	—	—	—	—	—	—	BPI: Gold
XO	Released: August 25, 1998; Label: DreamWorks (DRD 50048); Formats: CD, LP	104	46	—	—	—	41	123	BPI: Silver
Figure 8	Released: April 18, 2000; Label: DreamWorks (450 225); Formats: CD, 2×LP	99	45	45	59	29	44	37	BPI: Silver
From a Basement on the Hill	Released: October 19, 2004; Labels: ANTI- (86741), Domino (WIG147), Kill Rock Stars (KRS524); Formats: CD, 2xLP	19	50	45	11	37	52	41	

=== Live albums ===
List of live albums
Title	Album details
Elliott Smith: Live at Largo^{[A]}	Released: October 25, 2004; Label: Chronicle (9780811857994); Format: CD
Live at Umbra Penumbra^{[E]}	Released: August 28, 2020; Label: Kill Rock Stars; Format: CD/LP

=== Compilation albums ===
List of compilation albums, with chart positions
Title	Album details	Peak chart positions					
Title	Album details	US	BEL	FRA	IRL	SWE	UK
New Moon	Released: May 8, 2007; Labels: Kill Rock Stars (KRS 455), Domino (WIG198); Formats: CD, LP, digital download	24	28	81	22	48	39
An Introduction to... Elliott Smith	Released: November 2, 2010; Labels: Kill Rock Stars (KRS541), Domino (WIG265); Formts: CD, 2xLP, digital download	—	—	—	—	—	—
Heaven Adores You (Original Motion Picture Soundtrack)	Released: February 5, 2016; Labels: Universal; Formats: CD, LP, digital download	—	—	—	—	—	—
"—" denotes a release that did not chart.

=== Promotional compilations ===
List of promotional compilations
Year	Title	Notes
1996	Elliott Smith Sampler	A BMG sampler. Features "Some Song" and various songs from Roman Candle, Elliott Smith, and Either/Or.
1997	Untitled Girlie Action Media Either/Or sampler	Features "Speed Trials", "Angeles", "Ballad of Big Nothing", "Between the Bars", and "Say Yes". Packaging features phone numbers for Smith's press contacts at Girlie Action Media.
1998	Snippets from XO	Promo cassette issued in support of Smith's 1998 Australian tour; features 30-second snippets of "Waltz #2 (XO)", "Baby Britain", "Sweet Adeline", "Bled White", "Tomorrow Tomorrow", and "Bottle Up and Explode!"
1998	A Brief History	DreamWorks sampler. Songs include "Tomorrow Tomorrow", "Waltz #2 (XO)", "Miss Misery", "Pictures of Me", "Say Yes", "Southern Belle", "Coming Up Roses", "No Name #1", "Last Call", "Division Day", and "Some Song".
2001	Roman Candle / Elliott Smith / Either/Or (box set)	A Domino CD box set of Smith's first three albums.
2004	From a Basement on the Hill Album Sampler	Domino sampler. Features "Coast to Coast", "Pretty (Ugly Before)", "A Fond Farewell", "Don't Go Down", and "Little One".

== Singles ==
=== Retail singles ===
List of retail singles, with chart positions
Year	Single	Peak chart positions		Album
Year	Single	FRA	UK	Album
1995	"Needle in the Hay"	—	—	Elliott Smith
1996	"Division Day"^{[B]}	—	—	Non-album single
1996	"No Name #6"	—	—	Non-album single
1996	"Speed Trials"	—	—	Either/Or
1998	"Ballad of Big Nothing"	83	182	Either/Or
1998	"Waltz #2 (XO)"	—	52	XO
1999	"Baby Britain"	—	55	XO
1999	"Happiness"	—	—	Figure 8
2000	"Son of Sam"	—	55	Figure 8
2003	"Pretty (Ugly Before)"	—	85	Non-album single^{[C]}

=== Posthumous singles ===
Year	Single	Peak chart positions	Album
Year	Single	FRA	Album
2012	"Alternate Versions from Either/Or" 7"	—	Either/Or
2013	"Needle in the Hay" (Trumpet Version)	—	Non-album digital single
2014	"Between the Bars"	132	Either/Or
2017	"Pretty (Ugly Before)" (Live at Largo)	—	7-Inches for Planned Parenthood/digital single

=== Promotional singles ===
List of promotional singles
Year	Single	Album	Notes
1998	XO	XO	Features "Waltz #2 (XO)", "Bottle Up and Explode!", and "Oh Well, Okay".
1999	"Miss Misery"	Non-album single	Featured on the soundtrack for Good Will Hunting.
1999	"Because" (Beatles cover)	Non-album single	Featured on the soundtrack for American Beauty.
2000	B-Sides, Alternate Versions and Demos	Non-album single	Features "Bottle Up and Explode!" (Early Version), "Waltz #1" (Demo), "Some (Rock) Song", and "The Enemy Is You".
2000	3 Titres Inedits	Non-album single	Features "I Can't Answer You Anymore", as well as an alternate version of "Pretty Mary K" and an acoustic version of "Happiness". This CD was also bundled with some French versions of Figure 8.

=== Split singles ===
List of split singles, with other artists
Year	Single	Other artist	Notes
1994	"Shytown"/"No Confidence Man"	Pete Krebs	Originally released on Slo-Mo Records; sold as a digital single in 2013 through UseMusic, with proceeds benefiting Outside/In of Portland, OR; re-released on Suicide Squeeze Records in 2016 with new mixes and cover artwork.
1996	Spring Tour '96 (split cassette)	The Softies	Elliott Smith songs included "Coming Up Roses", "Needle in the Hay", "Clementine", "St. Ides Heaven", and "Single File" (from Smith's 1995 self-titled album on Kill Rock Stars); the Softies' side included songs from their 1995 album on K Records, It's Love.

== Music videos ==
List of music videos, with directors
Year	Title	Director	Reference
1995	"Coming Up Roses"	Ross Harris	
1997	"Miss Misery"	Ross Harris	
1998	"Baby Britain"	Steve Hanft	
2000	"Son of Sam"	Autumn de Wilde	

== Contributions ==
List of contributions to other artists, with notes
Year	Song(s)	Album	Artist	Notes	Reference
1995	"Suit of Running Water"	Nope	Ain't	Performed tremolo guitar	
1996	"Madding" "For No One Else"	Strand	The Spinanes	Sang backing vocals	
1996	"I Figured You Out"	Martian Saints!	Mary Lou Lord	Engineered and mixed	
1996	"Rougher"	Infinity Plus	Lois	Performed guitar and sang backing vocals	
1996	"Birthday Boy"	Jabberjaw Compilation, Vol. 2: Pure Sweet Hell	Various artists (Mary Lou Lord)	Performed guitar and produced	
1997	"Tom Waits and the Attack of the Crab Monster"	Western Electric	Pete Krebs	Performed drums, air organ, keyboards, and "recyclables"; co-wrote and engineered	
1997	"Demon for Today"	Western Electric	Pete Krebs	Performed drums, air organ, and keyboards; co-wrote and engineered	
1997	—N/a	Western Electric	Pete Krebs	Producer; recorded the album	
1998	"Shake Sugaree"	Got No Shadow	Mary Lou Lord	Performed guitar	
1998	—N/a	Killer of Friendships	Jr. High	Producer	
1998	—N/a	Featuring "Birds"	Quasi	Producer	
1998	"Killer" "Parked Car Homestead"	The Trackhouse, the Valley, and the Liquor-Store Drive-Thru	Birddog	Produced both songs, performed bass and drums on "Killer"	
1999	"All the Same" "Empty Words" "Under a Cloud"	Field Studies	Quasi	Performed bass guitar	
1999	"Critical Mass" "So Long"	No Memory	No.2	Sang backing vocals and mixed	
1999	"They Wave"	Horse Tricks	Mark De Gli Antoni	Performed piano and sang vocals	
2000	"The Loneliest of Faces"^{[D]}	Down in Fall	The Minders	Performed guitar	
2001	"Third and South"	A Sweet and Bitter Fancy	Birddog	Performed bass, piano and drums	
2001	"Hell Below/Stars Above"	Hell Below/Stars Above	Toadies	Performed piano	
2001	"Fine to See You" "Skills Like This" "How's My Drinking?"	Isolation Drills	Guided by Voices	Performed piano	
2002	"Summertime"	Blue Swan Orchestra	Goldenboy	Sang backing vocals	
2003	"Tore Up & Broke"	Plastic Fang	Blues Explosion	Sang backing vocals	
Posthumous contribution appearances
2005	"Meet Me in the City"	Sunday Nights: The Songs of Junior Kimbrough	Various artists (Blues Explosion)	Performed guitar and engineered	
2008	"Dream Flowers"	Magic Monsters	April March and Steve Hanft	Performed piano and drums	
2011	"Who's Behind the Door?"	Live From Nowhere Near You Vol. 2: Pacific Northwest	Various artists (No. 2)	Performed guitar and keyboards, sang backing vocals and produced	
"N/A" denotes contributions on all songs.

== Soundtrack inclusions ==
- Lucky Three (1997) – "Baby Britain" (instrumental), "Between the Bars" (live), "Thirteen" (live Big Star cover), "Angeles" (live)
- The Maker (1997) – "Ballad of Big Nothing", "Cupid's Trick"
- Good Will Hunting (1997) – "Miss Misery", "Between the Bars" (orchestral version), "No Name #3", "Angeles", "Say Yes"
- Hurricane Streets (1997) – "Say Yes"
- Strange Parallel (1998) – Various studio and live versions of Smith's songs; also features his covers of George Harrison's "Isn't It a Pity" and Sergei Rachmaninoff's "Prelude Op3 #2 in C Sharp Minor", and a dub cover of "Waltz #2 (XO)" performed by Future Pigeon
- American Beauty (1999) – "Because" (Beatles cover)
- Opposite Sex (2000) (Season 1, Episode 1: "Pilot") – "Say Yes"
- Opposite Sex (2000) (Season 1, Episode 2: "The Virgin Episode") – "The Biggest Lie"
- Keeping the Faith (2000) – "Pitseleh"
- Antitrust (2001) – "Son of Sam"
- The Royal Tenenbaums (2001) – "Needle in the Hay"
- Southlander (2001) – "Splitsville", "Snowbunny's Serenade" (an alternate version of "Bye", from Figure 8)
- Ora o mai più (Now or Never) (2003) – "Say Yes"
- One Tree Hill (2003) (Season 1, Episode 7: "Life in a Glass House") – "Say Yes"
- The Girl Next Door (2004) – "Angeles"
- Thumbsucker (2005) – "Let's Get Lost", "Trouble" (Cat Stevens cover), "Thirteen" (Big Star cover, originally in Lucky Three)
- The O.C. (2005) (Season 2, Episode 7: "Family Ties") – "Twilight"
- The O.C. (2005) (Season 2, Episode 10: "The Accomplice") – "Pretty (Ugly Before)"
- Cold Case (2005) (Season 2, Episode 16: "Revenge") – "Waltz #2 (XO)"
- One Tree Hill (2006) (Season 3, Episode 22: "The Show Must Go On") – "Say Yes"
- CSI: NY (2006) (Season 2, Episode 24: "Charge of This Post") – "Angeles"
- Criminal Minds (2006) (Season 2, Episode 5: "The Aftermath") – "Clementine"
- Ha-Shminiya (2006) (Season 2, Episode 8: "Matisse's Moroccans") – "Pretty Mary K"
- Die Österreichische Methode (2006) – "Tomorrow Tomorrow"
- Georgia Rule (2007) – "I Don't Think I'm Ever Gonna Figure It Out"
- Heroes (2007) (Season 1, Episode 23: "How to Stop an Exploding Man") – "The Last Hour"
- Gossip Girl (2007) (Season 1, Episode 7: "Victor/Victrola") – "Whatever (Folk Song in C)"
- The Go-Getter (2007) – "Coast to Coast"
- Paranoid Park (2007) – "Angeles", "The White Lady Loves You More"
- Life (2008) (Season 2, Episode 16: "Crushed") – "Pretty (Ugly Before)"
- Skins (2008) (Season 2, Episode 10: "Everyone") – "Between the Bars"
- Guitar Hero 5 (2009) – "L.A."
- Up in the Air (2009) – "Angel in the Snow"
- American Pie Presents: The Book of Love (2009) – "Say Yes"
- Fresh Meat (2011) (Series 1: Episode 1) – "Waltz #2"
- True Blood (2012) (Season 5, Episode 8: "Somebody That I Used to Know") – "Somebody That I Used to Know"
- Stuck in Love (2012) – "Between the Bars"
- Love, Rosie (2014) – "Son of Sam"
- Rick and Morty (2015) (Season 2, Episode 7: "Big Trouble in Little Sanchez") – "Between the Bars"
- 13 Reasons Why (2017) (Season 1, Episode 5) – "Thirteen (Big Star cover)"
- Mr. Robot (2017) (Season 3, Episode 4) – "Everything Means Nothing to Me"
- The Sunlit Night (2019) – "Pretty (Ugly Before)"
- Normal People (2020) (Season 1, Episode 2) – "Angeles"
- Mickey 17 (2025) – "Twilight"

== Compilation inclusions ==
- So, What Else Do You Do? (1994) – "Roman Candle"
- A Slice of Lemon (1995) – "Big Decision"
- American Pie, Vol. 2: I Can't Hear You (Again) (1996) – "Roman Candle"
- Some Songs: From the Kill Rock Stars Singles (1997) – "Some Song"
- To All the URLs I've Loved Before (1997) – "Some (Rock) Song"
- Un Eté 97 (1997) – "Speed Trials"
- CMJ New Music Monthly, Vol. 44 (1997) – "Rose Parade"
- Chill Out With the Class of '97 (1997) – "Say Yes"
- CMJ New Music Monthly, Vol. 61 (1998) – "Waltz #2 (XO)"
- Virtually Alternative September 98 (1998) – "Waltz #2 (XO)"
- Select Magazine: Hot! (1998) – "Ballad of Big Nothing"
- Vive La Différence – Nouveautés Domino 98/99 (1998) – "Speed Trials"
- Rare Trax Vol. 8 – Unerhört! Die Heimlichen Hits Von 98 (1998) – "Division Day"
- Virtually Alternative October 98 (1998) – "Waltz #2 (XO)"
- Musician Magazine's A Little on the CD Side Volume 31 (1998) – "Waltz #2 (XO)"
- Screenadelica (Hot Sounds from Cool Movies) (1998) – "Miss Misery"
- Rolling Stone New Voices Vol. 23 (1998) – "Pictures of Me"
- Universal Music CD Sampler 1998 #5 (1998) – "Waltz #2 (XO)"
- EMI Hit Disc 105 – Album CD Sampler Information May '98 (1998) – "Between the Bars"
- New Music Spins 9 (1998) – "Waltz #2 (XO)", "Independence Day", and "Baby Britain"
- Good Will Hunting Sampler (1998) – "Between the Bars" and "Miss Misery"
- Universal Ser Fremover Vol. 7 (1998) – "Waltz #2 (XO)"
- Air Check (1998) – "See You Later" (Heatmiser cover)
- Humo – Alle 98 Goed (1998) – "Waltz #2"
- Unconditionally Guaranteed (The Coolest Sounds from the Hottest Bands of 1998) (1998) – "Between the Bars"
- Wicked Good Sampler 05 (1998) – "Waltz #2"
- Une Rentrée 98 (1998) – "Waltz #2"
- Virtually Alternative December 98, V. 99 (1998) – "Baby Britain"
- Radioactive Top 40 & Alternative Series No. 02 (May 1998) (1998) – "Miss Misery" (Radio Edit)
- Howlin' Kitty promo (1998) – "Independence Day"
- Habits of the Heart (1998) – "Sweet Adeline"
- Drinking From Puddles: A Radio History (1999) – "Everybody Cares, Everybody Understands" (live at KBVR)
- YoYo a Go Go '97: Another Live Compilation (1998) – "Rose Parade" (live)
- NME Annual Probe, Vol. 2 (1999) – "Pictures of Me"
- Chivas Regal (1999) – "Waltz #1"
- 8 trax plus 2 promo (1999) – "Baby Britain"
- Virtuallyalternative 100 (January '99) (1999) – "Baby Britain"
- All Is Full of Love (1999) – "Waltz #2 (XO)"
- American Eagle Outfitters: The Blue Album, Vol. 2 (1998) – "Waltz #2 (XO)"
- A Little on the CD Side, Vol. 31 (1998) – "Waltz #2 (XO)"
- Network 40: CD Tuneup 109 (1998) – "Miss Misery"
- Liberation! HMV Exclusive Sampler (1998) – "Independence Day"
- WBCN 3:16 (1999) – "Baby Britain"
- Back to School domestic sampler promo (1999) – "Our Thing"
- OUI Radiorock Volume 01 (2000) – "Son of Sam"
- CMJ New Music Monthly Volume 81 May 2000 (2000) – "Son of Sam"
- Objectif 2000 – Tome 2 (2000) – "Happiness/The Gondola Man"
- DreamWorks Fall sampler promo (2000) – "A Living Will"
- Sweet & Pungent DreamWorks sampler (2000) – "Son of Sam"
- WFUV New Names New Music (2000) – "Son of Sam"
- Cavity Search Records Audio Resume (2000) – "Condor Ave."
- WXPN 88.5 FM New Names New Music (2000) – "Son of Sam"
- FMQB MQB Modern Rock on the Dial: An FMQB CD Sampler March 2000 Promo (2000) – "Son of Sam"
- Indie 2000 Volume 5 (2000) – "Waltz #2"
- TapeOp: A Compact Disc of Creative Music Recordings (2000) – "Waltz #1" (demo)
- Romantic Collection 2000 Harmony (2000) – "Because" (Beatles cover)
- Monitor This! (2000) – "Son of Sam"
- the deep end (2000) – "Happiness" (edit)
- Yeti: Volume I (2000) – "Angel in the Snow"
- Filthy Festival Fun: A Polydor New Release Sampler (2000) – "Wouldn't Mama Be Proud?"
- LAUNCH (Launch Media CD-ROM) (2000) – "Son of Sam", "Somebody That I Used to Know", "Happiness"
- Open All Night: In the City (2001) – "Miss Misery"
- Rokkland Rás 2 (2001) – "Waltz #2 (XO)"
- Magnet New Music Sampler Volume 27 (2002) – "Summertime" [Goldenboy feat. Elliott Smith]
- The Amos House Collection, Volume II (2002) – "Bottle Up and Explode!" (early version)
- Worlds of Possibility: Domino's 10th Anniversary (2003) – "Speed Trials"
- Worlds Of Possibility sampler (2003) – "Speed Trials"
- Music Inspired by Bumbershoot (2003) – "Pretty (Ugly Before)"
- Triple J's Hottest 100 10th Anniversary – Hottest Box (2003) – "Waltz #2 (XO)"
- Sonically Speaking (Vol 19: Oktober 2004) (2004) – "Twilight"
- Magnet New Music Sampler, Vol. 35 (2004) – "Twilight"
- Declaration of Independence (2004) – "Ballad of Big Nothing"
- Future Soundtrack for America (2004) – "A Distorted Reality Is Now a Necessity to Be Free"
- A Declaration Of Independence – The Sound of Domino (2004) – "Twilight"
- Une Rentrée 2004 – Vol. 2 (2004) – "Twilight"
- Vital Music (2004) – "Pretty (Ugly Before)"
- The Best Soundtrack Vol. 2 MP3 (2004) – "Because" (Beatles cover)
- Paste Magazine (Issue 12) (2004) – "Memory Lane"
- 2004 Volume One (15 Tracks from the Year's Best New Albums) (2004) – "Memory Lane"
- Rolling Stone New Noises Vol. 68 (2004) – "A Fond Farewell"
- Sounds – Now! (2004) – "Pretty (Ugly Before)"
- Oorgasm 19 (2004) – "Twilight"
- Word of Mouth 21 (2004) – "Twilight"
- Another Urban Outfitter Sampler (2004) – "Pretty (Ugly Before)"
- The Bands 05 (2004) – "Coast to Coast"
- Alternative Distribution Alliance Fall 2004 Sampler (2004) – "Twilight"
- X-Rock #7 (2004) – "Coast to Coast"
- All Tomorrow's Parties v3.1 (2005) – "Pictures of Me"
- Triple J Hottest 100 v12 (2005) – "Memory Lane"
- Beatles Regrooved (2005) – "Because" (Beatles cover)
- The Best Acoustic Album in the World... Ever! (2005) – "Let's Get Lost"
- Domino – Inverno 2005 (2005) – "Twilight"
- Vital Sales & Marketing Best of 2004/Best of 2005 (2005) – "Pretty (Ugly Before)"
- Acoustico (2005) – "Speed Trials"
- Here Comes the Sun (2005) – "Let's Get Lost"
- Rough Trade Shops – Counter Culture 04 Best of 2004 (2005) – "Let's Get Lost"
- Wide Awake – It's All About Songs (2005) – "Let's Get Lost"
- Everything You Need (2005) – "Twilight"
- Rough Trade Shops: Singer Songwriter (2006) – "Needle in the Hay"
- The Definitive Tom Dunne Vol. 01: Pet Picks 2000–2006 (2006) – "Son of Sam"
- Mellow Gold (2006) – "A Fond Farewell"
- Suicide Squeeze: Slaying Since 1996 (2006) – "Division Day"
- Alternative Acoustic (2006) – "Say Yes"
- 2004 (Ein Jahr Und Seine 20 Songs) (2006) – "A Fond Farewell"
- Mo's Songs! (2006) – "Waltz #2 (XO)"
- Late Night Tales: Air (2006) – "Let's Get Lost"
- Panic Prevention Vol. 4 (Jamie T DJ mix) (2006) – "Needle in the Hay"
- Wide Awake 3 – It's All About Songs (2007) – "Angel in the Snow"
- Mojo Presents: Love Will Tear You Apart (2007) – "Twilight"
- Un Printemps 2007 – Vol. 2 (2007) – "High Times"
- Kylie Minogue – Music and Moments (2007) – "Angeles"
- 100 Trésors Cachés: Chansons Rares & Indispensables (2007) – "Condor Ave."
- Independent Innovative Creative (2007) – "High Times"
- Under the Milky Way (2007) – "Between the Bars"
- Kulturkantine (Acoustic Lounge: The Singer and Songwriter Session) (2007) – "Angeles"
- Sampler Real Love (2007) – "High Times"
- Mountain Magic: A Kill Rock Stars Collection 1991–2000 (2008) – "Angeles"
- Between the Lines II (2008) – "Son of Sam"
- Asia Argento – Asia Argento (2008) – "Waltz #1"
- 100% Bittersweet Melodies (2008) – "Waltz #2"
- Het Beste Van 2 Meter Sessies 1987–2009 (2009) – "Waltz #2"
- Sleeping Beauties (Songs We Shouldn't Forget) (2009) – "Say Yes"
- Jazz Supreme Modal Waltz-a-Nova (2009) – "Waltz #1"
- 100 Hits Indie (2009) – "Ballad of Big Nothing"
- Kill Rock Stars Best Sampler Ever (2010) – "Angeles"
- Grandes Canções Do Cinema (2010) – "Miss Misery"
- Paste Magazine New – Music Sampler June 2010 Issue 64 (2010) – "Last Call"
- 25 Years Pukkelpop (2010) – "Waltz #2 (XO)"
- Les Inrockuptibles – Best Of 2000–2010 (2010) – "Son of Sam"
- Hit Disc Nov. 2010 (2010) – "Between the Bars"
- Hype Machine Radio Show: April 2010 (2010) – "Twilight"
- 20 Years of Kill Rock Stars (2011) – "Between the Bars"
- Live from Nowhere Near You, Vol. 2 (2011) – "The Real Estate"
- L'Anthologie Des InRocks – 25 Ans De Musique (2011) – "Between the Bars"
- Les Beaux Labels (Volume 1) (2011) – "Ballad of Big Nothing"
- Rise & Shine (2012) – "Summertime" [Goldenboy feat. Elliott Smith]
- Keep Portland Weird – City Sound Step 2: Portland (2012) – "Needle in the Hay"
- L'Inrockuptible 2 (Bernard Lenoir DJ mix) (2013) – "Baby Britain"
- Songs We Shouldn't Forget Collected (2013) – "Say Yes"
- Kill Rock Stars: Crazed Fans MP3 Vol. 1 (2014) – "Needle in the Hay" (Trumpet Version)
- Coffret 60 Ans De Musique (2014) – "Speed Trials"
- XPLAYMIX říjen 2014 (Strangers in the City DJ mix) (2014) – "No Name #1"
- 100 Hits Indie Anthems (2014) – "Angeles"
- Fort George (2014) – "Division Day"
- Rolling Stone Rare Trax Vol. 84 – Lost & Rare Tracks (2014) – "A Fond Farewell"
- Suicide Squeeze 20 Year Anniversary (2016) – "No Confidence Man"
- Het Allerbeste Uit Radio 1 Classics 1000 (2016) – "Waltz #2 (XO)"
- 7-Inches for Planned Parenthood (2017) – "Pretty (Ugly Before)" (Live at Largo)
- Het Allerbeste Uit Radio 1 Classics – 2018 (2018) – "Between the Bars"

== Filmography ==
List of appearances in films and documentaries, with role
Year	Film	Role
1997	Lucky Three: An Elliott Smith Portrait	Himself
1997	The Lonesome Crowded West	Himself
1998	Strange Parallel	Himself
2001	Southlander	Bus driver
2001	Untitled Paul Thomas Anderson short film	Basketball player
2014	Heaven Adores You	Himself (archival footage)

== Unreleased material ==
Unreleased tracks, demos, and covers have circulated over the Internet. The posthumous collection From a Basement on a Hill II attracted the attention of the media when it was first leaked online. Other leaks include the Grand Mal collection, which is updated yearly and, as of the latest edition, contains 131 tracks spread over eight discs, and the two-disc Basement Demos collection, which contains some of the same tracks as From a Basement on a Hill II along with a significant amount of additional unreleased material. Many of these leaks have taken place near the anniversary of Smith's death.

== See also ==
- List of songs recorded by Elliott Smith

== Notes ==
- A Released alongside copies of Elliott Smith by Autumn de Wilde.
- B Re-released on November 1, 2010, to promote An Introduction to... Elliott Smith.
- C Re-released on December 6, 2004, as the lead single from From a Basement on the Hill.
- D Credited as "Leicester Myth" in the album's liner notes.
- E Released as part of the 25th anniversary reissue of Elliott Smith.
