= Online Film Critics Society Awards 2013 =

17th Online Film Critics Society Awards

17th Online Film Critics Society Awards

December 16, 2013

Best Picture:
12 Years a Slave

The 17th Online Film Critics Society Awards, honoring the best in film for 2013, were announced on 16 December 2013.

== Winners and nominees ==
=== Best Picture ===
12 Years a Slave

- American Hustle
- Before Midnight
- Blue Is the Warmest Colour
- Drug War
- Gravity
- Her
- Inside Llewyn Davis
- Short Term 12
- The Wind Rises

=== Best Director ===
Alfonso Cuarón – Gravity

- Joel and Ethan Coen – Inside Llewyn Davis
- Spike Jonze – Her
- Steve McQueen – 12 Years a Slave
- Hayao Miyazaki – The Wind Rises

=== Best Actor ===
Chiwetel Ejiofor – 12 Years a Slave

- Tom Hanks – Captain Phillips
- Oscar Isaac – Inside Llewyn Davis
- Mads Mikkelsen – The Hunt
- Joaquin Phoenix – Her

=== Best Actress ===
Cate Blanchett – Blue Jasmine

- Amy Adams – American Hustle
- Julie Delpy – Before Midnight
- Adèle Exarchopoulos – Blue Is the Warmest Colour
- Brie Larson – Short Term 12

=== Best Supporting Actor ===
Michael Fassbender – 12 Years a Slave

- Barkhad Abdi – Captain Phillips
- Jared Leto – Dallas Buyers Club
- Matthew McConaughey – Mud
- Sam Rockwell – The Way, Way Back

=== Best Supporting Actress ===
Lupita Nyong'o – 12 Years a Slave

- Sally Hawkins – Blue Jasmine
- Scarlett Johansson – Her
- Jennifer Lawrence – American Hustle
- Léa Seydoux – Blue Is the Warmest Colour

=== Best Original Screenplay ===
Her – Spike Jonze

- American Hustle – Eric Warren Singer and David O. Russell
- Blue Jasmine – Woody Allen
- Inside Llewyn Davis – Joel and Ethan Coen
- Museum Hours – Jem Cohen

=== Best Adapted Screenplay ===
12 Years a Slave – John Ridley

- Before Midnight – Julie Delpy, Ethan Hawke, and Richard Linklater
- In the House – François Ozon
- Short Term 12 – Destin Daniel Cretton
- The Wind Rises – Hayao Miyazaki

=== Best Foreign Language Film ===
Blue Is the Warmest Colour

- Drug War
- Museum Hours
- Wadjda
- The Wind Rises

=== Best Documentary ===
The Act of Killing

- 56 Up
- At Berkeley
- Blackfish
- Stories We Tell

=== Best Animated Feature ===
The Wind Rises

- Despicable Me 2
- From Up on Poppy Hill
- Frozen
- Monsters University

=== Best Cinematography ===
Gravity – Emmanuel Lubezki

- 12 Years a Slave – Sean Bobbitt
- The Grandmaster – Philippe Le Sourd
- The Great Beauty – Luca Bigazzi
- Inside Llewyn Davis – Bruno Delbonnel

=== Best Editing ===
Gravity – Alfonso Cuarón and Mark Sanger

- 12 Years a Slave – Joe Walker
- Drug War – Allen Leung
- Her – Eric Zumbrunnen and Jeff Buchanan
- Inside Llewyn Davis – Roderick Jaynes
