= Strange Parallel =

- Elliott Smith with the "robot hand"
- Directed by: Steve Hanft
- Written by: Steve Hanft, Jason Mason, Elliott Smith
- Produced by: Raub Shapiro
- Starring: Elliott Smith, Larry Crane, Marne Lucas, Amber Strom, Gus Van Sant, Sam Coomes, Janet Weiss
- Cinematography: Steve Hanft
- Edited by: Steve Hanft, Paul Menne
- Music by: Elliott Smith
- Distributed by: DreamWorks SKG
- Release date: October 15, 1998
- Running time: 30 min
- Country: US

Strange Parallel is a documentary short film revolving around the American singer-songwriter Elliott Smith. The film was directed by Steve Hanft and released on October 15, 1998, and features interviews with Elliott himself as well as fans, friends and other acquaintances of his.

== Background ==
Strange Parallel includes interviews with Elliott Smith himself, as well as fans, friends and other acquaintances, including Gus Van Sant, Larry Crane and the members of Quasi. The film also includes snippets of Elliott Smith performing, as well as footage of him recording an unreleased song, "Brand New Game". The film sometimes moves out of reality, with acted-out, metaphorical sequences that involve Elliott considering purchasing a mechanical hand (a "robot hand") to improve his music.

The film takes place mostly in New York City and Portland, Oregon. The title is a direct quote from an interview of one of Elliott's acquaintances (a bartender) who said he felt a "strange parallel" between himself and Elliott when he met him.

The film was used for promotion only and is not available for purchase.

Director Steve Hanft says this about the film:

In 1998, I was hired to make a film for the reclusive rocker Elliott Smith. Very excited, I flew to Portland, Oregon, where he was staying and met with him to figure it out before we filmed. At the meeting he explained, in a very quiet voice, with a slight smile, that he didn't want it to be a straight-up documentary. So I suggested he write down some of his dreams. The next day, we met again, and he began talking a lot, and louder, telling me all about how he "had a fucked up dream last night". It was very funny when he explained it, everyone in and around the music business he was in was telling him to get a mechanical hand to replace the hand that he'd trained for so long to play guitar. There was also a military recruiter who came into the bar where he was writing a song that would yell at him for no reason, and Satan was there; that kills me. A lot of people who know him from his music don't understand that he was really funny. So we wrote the dream into the shot list and intercut it into the more traditional music footage. It was hard to get the documentary footage out of him; he hated being interviewed. He was much more into the dream sequence and we had a lot fun shooting it. It was an amazing experience and just knowing a guy like that, so talented and brutally honest, has changed my life. Bless him.

== Music featured ==
All songs written and performed by Elliott Smith, except as noted.

- "Independence Day"
- "Waltz #2 (XO)" (live)
- "Brand New Game" (early version, unreleased)
- "Miss Misery"
- "Waltz #2 (XO)"
- "Waltz #1"
- "Bottle Up and Explode!" (live)
- "Robot Hand Jive" and "In Between Time" (narration music) – written and performed by Dada Munchamonkey (a.k.a. Ed Ruscha, Jr.)
- "Isn't It a Pity?" (live) – written by George Harrison
- "Ballad of Big Nothing" (live)
- "Happiness" (live)
- "Waltz #1" (theremin) – performed by Sam Coomes, arranged by Elliott Smith
- "Waltz #2 (XO)" (dub version) – written by Elliott Smith, performed by Future Pigeon
- "Prelude Op3 #2 in C Sharp Minor" (live) – written by Sergei Rachmaninoff, performed by Elliott Smith
- "Coming Up Roses"
- "Oh Well, Okay" (live)
- "Baby Britain"

== Cast ==
Interviewees

- Gus Van Sant (director of Good Will Hunting)
- Chuck (bartender)
- Sam Coomes and Janet Weiss (of Quasi)
- Larry Crane
- Marne Lucas
- Amber Strom
- Harry Kulpoenen

Additional appearances

- Dave England as Devil
- Sasha Fuentes as Robot Hand Salesman
- Ross Harris as Robot Hand Salesman
- James Lee Ellis as Doctor
- Akhigbonde Francis as Doctor
- Amy Metsman as Member of the Board
- William Edwards as chairman of the board
- Sean Croghan as Sgt. Slaughter
- Joanna Bolme as Recording Engineer
- Robin Bauer as Devil Sympathizer
- Laura Nerlove as Devil Sympathizer
- Sonia Manalli as Medical Technician
- Vanessa Reyes as Medical Technician
- Brent Sersen as Member of the Board
- Tracy Van Zandt as Devil Sympathizer
