= From a Basement on the Hill =

Studio album by Elliott Smith
- Released: October 18, 2004
- Recorded: 2000–2003
- Genre: Indie rock
- Length: 57:44
- Labels: Anti-; Domino
- Producers: Elliott Smith; Rob Schnapf; Joanna Bolme

Elliott Smith chronology
Figure 8 (2000)	From a Basement on the Hill (2004)	New Moon (2007)

Singles from From a Basement on the Hill
- 1. "Pretty (Ugly Before)" Released: 2003

From a Basement on the Hill is the sixth and final studio album by the American singer-songwriter Elliott Smith. Recorded from 2000 to 2003, and faced with multiple delays due to Smith's personal problems leading up to his death, it was released posthumously in the UK and Europe on Domino on October 18, 2004, and in the US the following day on October 19, 2004, through record label Anti-, almost a year after his death.

The album was initially planned as a double album, and was incomplete at the time of Smith's death. Many of the songs Smith intended for the album remained unfinished, in some cases lacking only vocals. Smith's family hired his former producer Rob Schnapf and ex-girlfriend Joanna Bolme to sort through and finish the batch of over thirty songs that were recorded for the album, although the estate retained final decision on which tracks to include.

From a Basement on the Hill became Smith's highest-charting album in the US and was praised by critics, with reviewers complimenting the album's attempts to expand Smith's sound, such as the incorporation of instrumental passages, as well as heavier, guitar-based material. Many of the songs reference Smith's struggles with drug addiction and depression.

== Background ==
On October 21, 2003, Elliott Smith died of two stab wounds to the chest following an argument with his girlfriend, Jennifer Chiba. The coroner reviewing Smith's death did not present conclusive evidence for or against homicide.

Smith experienced addiction and mental illness for much of his career, though he was sober in his final days, seeking treatment at the Neurotransmitter Restoration Center in Beverly Hills. Smith's sudden, self-imposed sobriety was stressful, and was followed by a more intense fixation on his own psychological trauma.

== Recording and production ==
Smith had over fifty songs on tape reel or digital hard drive. He completed mixing on nine of these tracks, with several others lacking only minor revisions or final vocals. Smith's estate hired Rob Schnapf, producer of Smith's earlier albums Either/Or, XO, and Figure 8, and musician and recording engineer Joanna Bolme, Smith's former girlfriend, to complete mixing on these tracks, eventually choosing fifteen for inclusion on the album, which was ultimately released on the Anti- label. When asked why he personally took up the job of finishing the album, Schnapf stated, "I had a paternal, protective feeling. I didn't want anybody mucking it up."

Musician and producer David McConnell, although present throughout much of the actual recording process, was not consulted by Schnapf or Bolme during the mixing process.

== Content ==
"Coast to Coast" features poetry by Nelson Gary. Smith told Under the Radar in 2003: "I asked this friend of mine to make up something he could say as fast as he could in fifteen minutes about people healing themselves or being unable to heal themselves. While he's saying this thing there is a main vocal that goes over that." The lyric "You're keeping me around, until I finally drag us both down" details a dysfunctional relationship.

"Pretty (Ugly Before)" was previously released as a single in August 2003 on Suicide Squeeze Records, along with a different version of "A Distorted Reality Is Now a Necessity to Be Free". According to McConnell, Smith did not intend to have "Pretty (Ugly Before)" on the album.

Schnapf noted that the track "Ostrich & Chirping", a short instrumental made from sampling and looping the noises made by a toy bird, had nothing to do with Smith and was something that McConnell had recorded by himself. McConnell said "don't ask me how this ended up on the record, I totally forgot I had put that on one of his reels."

== Release ==
From a Basement on the Hill was released on October 19, 2004, almost a year after Smith's death, through record label ANTI-, a sub-label of Epitaph. It debuted at No. 19 in the US, selling 43,000 copies, giving him his best first week sales, and making it his highest-charting album in the US to date. The album has also been re-released by Kill Rock Stars, alongside a remastered reissue of his 1994 debut, Roman Candle.

When asked what Smith would have thought of the album, McConnell told Benjamin Nugent, "I don't think he would have delivered [that] record. The record he would have delivered would have had more songs, would have had different mixes and [been] a little more in-your-face." Schnapf also expressed that the final result that he and Bolme had produced was not the album that Smith would have made, simply because Elliott was not around to finish the album. Bolme also said that they did not add anything to the songs, and only mixed whatever had been recorded: "I would never presume to add anything. We didn't add anything."

== Reception ==
Professional ratings
Aggregate scores
Source	Rating
Metacritic	88/100
Review scores
Source	Rating
AllMusic	4.5/5 stars
Entertainment Weekly	A−
The Guardian	5/5 stars
Los Angeles Times	4/4 stars
Mojo	4/5 stars
NME	9/10
Pitchfork	7.2/10 (2004); 8.4/10 (2010)
Q	4/5 stars
Rolling Stone	3.5/5 stars
Spin	A−

From a Basement on the Hill was well received by critics. On music review aggregator website Metacritic, the album holds an approval rating of 88 out of 100 based on 37 reviews, indicating "universal acclaim". It is one of the site's all-time highest-rated albums. Many reviewers complimented the album's attempts to expand Smith's sound, such as the incorporation of instrumental passages, as well as heavier, guitar-based material.

Pitchfork called it "perfectly coherent and cohesive, without any sense of being slapped together from half-finished parts." E! Online called it "a beautiful swansong to one of this generation's best." Filter called it "large and epic, but tense and claustrophobic as well, and, gratefully, it's as close to Elliott as we've ever been." Billboard stated that "Smith bundles together subtlety and ferocity to create one of his heart-aching best... Consider it a 'fond farewell' to one of this generations most poignant and gifted songwriters." Rolling Stone had some reservations, observing that "this is an album about the seductions of oblivion, and a few of the more densely arranged songs mimic the characters in the lyrics, stumbing around without quite connecting. More often though, Smith teases extraordinary wit and warmth from songs that float lazily toward happiness."

Q magazine wrote, "Given that its backstory involves one of the grimmest deaths in music history, it's tempting to view this album darkly, but really, there's no denying the new twist here... Without wanting to second-guess his mindset, this music often sounds like the madness surrounding its creator – his heroin troubles, an allegedly turbulent relationship, his struggles against depression. So what dominates are these loud, wayward Los Angeles epics full of gothic grandeur, broken-glass emotions, bizarre soundscapes and heavy, early-'70s guitars." The review concluded, "All posthumous releases receive garlands of praise but this would take your breath away whatever the circumstances".

Sindri Eldon, a journalist for Reykjavík Grapevine wrote, "...the foreshadowing of his suicide is so strong that it's difficult to listen to." Other critics, however, were cautious about viewing the album in relation to Smith's death: Mojo argued that "to do so would be to miss the crucial point – that From a Basement on the Hill is of a piece within a body of work that stretches back to the mid-'90s," and praised the album's musical style: "here, he alights upon an approach that would have gone on to serve him admirably well." NME observed that the opening track "Coast to Coast" "sets out the themes which run through the whole album: chronic self-doubt, poisonous sarcasm, a prevailing sense of having had enough of trying to fulfil other people's expectations", and went on to state that "while this is clearly not the record Smith intended to make, it's still an immensely gripping and cohesive piece of work. For all his experiments with grungier rock and spectral acoustics, From a Basement... holds together convincingly. It sounds like a completely finished album, and one which, remarkably, is a match for the very best in Smith's catalogue."

== Track listing ==
All tracks are written by Elliott Smith, except "Ostrich & Chirping", written by David McConnell.

From a Basement on the Hill track listing
No.	Title	Length
1.	"Coast to Coast"	5:33
2.	"Let's Get Lost"	2:27
3.	"Pretty (Ugly Before)"	4:45
4.	"Don't Go Down"	4:34
5.	"Strung Out Again"	3:12
6.	"A Fond Farewell"	3:58
7.	"King's Crossing"	4:57
8.	"Ostrich & Chirping"	0:33
9.	"Twilight"	4:29
10.	"A Passing Feeling"	3:32
11.	"The Last Hour"	3:27
12.	"Shooting Star"	6:01
13.	"Memory Lane"	2:30
14.	"Little One"	3:14
15.	"A Distorted Reality Is Now a Necessity to Be Free"	4:32
Total length:		57:44

== Personnel ==
- Elliott Smith – all instruments not listed below, production, recording, front cover handwriting

Additional personnel

- Steven Drozd – drums on "Coast to Coast"
- Aaron Sperske – drums on "Coast to Coast"
- Nelson Gary – poetry reading on "Coast to Coast"
- Sam Coomes – bass guitar and backing vocals on "Pretty (Ugly Before)"
- Aaron Embry – keyboards on "Pretty (Ugly Before)"
- Scott McPherson – drums on "Pretty (Ugly Before)"
- Fritz Michaud – drums on "King's Crossing"

Technical

- Autumn DeWilde – sleeve typography
- Joanna Bolme – mixing
- Rob Schnapf – mixing
- Scott Wiley – engineering assistance
- Ted Jensen – mastering
- Andrew Beckman – recording (additional)
- Chris Chandler – recording (additional)
- David McConnell – recording (additional)
- Dee Robb – recording (additional)
- Fritz Michaud – recording (additional)
- Jon Brion – recording (additional)
- Matthew Ellard – recording (additional)
- Pete Magdaleno – recording (additional)
- Ryan Castle – recording (additional)
- Tom Biller – recording (additional)
- Valente Torres – recording (additional)
- Nick Pritchard – sleeve design
- Renaud Monfourny – front cover photograph
- Ashley Welch – sleeve photography
- Dominic DiSaia – sleeve photography
- Paul Heartfield – sleeve photography

== Chart positions ==
Chart performance for From a Basement on the Hill
Chart (2004)	Peak position
Australian ARIA Albums Chart	50
Belgian Albums Chart (Flanders)	47
Canadian Albums Chart	33
French SNEP Albums Chart	45
Irish Albums Chart	11
Norwegian Albums Chart	37
Scottish Albums (Official Charts)	34
Swedish Albums Chart	52
UK Albums Chart	41
US Billboard 200	19
US Billboard Independent Albums	1
