= David McConnell =

David McConnell could refer to:

- David H. McConnell (1858-1937), American businessman
- David McConnell (musician), American musician and artist
- Dave McConnell (born 1981), Scottish rugby league footballer
