= Bled White =

Bled White may refer to:

- Bled White (song), a song by Elliott Smith
- Bled White (film), a 2011 zombie horror film
