= Southlander =

2001 film by Steve Hanft

- DVD cover
- Directed by: Steve Hanft
- Written by: Ross Harris; Steve Hanft; Bob Stephenson
- Produced by: Darren Lavett; Laurie Malaga; Kerstin Mueller
- Starring: Rory Cochrane; Ross Harris; Beth Orton
- Cinematography: Lance Acord
- Edited by: Haines Hall; Saar Kline; Paul Menne
- Music by: Eddie Ruscha
- Production companies: Propaganda Films; Phineas Atwood Productions
- Distributed by: GoDigital Media Group; Eclectic DVD Distribution
- Release date: April 21, 2001
- Running time: 80 minutes
- Country: United States
- Language: English

Southlander (also known as Southlander: Diary of a Desperate Musician) is a 2001 American independent film by Steve Hanft and Ross Harris. Originally titled Recycler, after the Los Angeles magazine of the same name, the film writers changed the name of the movie to Southlander to avoid trademark issues. The film was reissued in 2016 without the involvement of Hanft and Harris.

== Plot ==
Down-and-out keyboardist Chance (Rory Cochrane) sees his redemption in touring with dub-pop band Future Pigeon, fronted by the lovely Rocket (Beth Orton). However, to guarantee a spot in the band, Chance needs a signature sound, which he finds in the futuristic '69 "Molotron" keyboard. Chance's dreams are put on hold on the eve of the tour, however, when the Molotron is stolen from his car. Southlander follows Chance and his friend Ross Angeles (Ross Harris) as they track down the stolen keyboard through the pages of the Southlander, a local rag that publishes classified ads for musical equipment. The journey quickly becomes a surreal trip through LA's underground music scene.

== Cast ==
- Rory Cochrane as Chance
- Ross Harris as Ross Angeles / Bek's Jam Double Axe
- Lawrence Hilton Jacobs as Motherchild
- Beth Orton as Rocket
- Beck as Bek
- Hank Williams III as Hank 3
- Jennifer Herrema as Record Girl
- Gregg Henry as Lane Wildbird
- Richard Edson as Thomas
- Ione Skye as Miss Highrise
- Mark Gonzales as Vince
- Laura Prepon as Seven = Five
- Robosaurus as Self
- Scott L. Schwartz as Chef
- Steven Barr as Policeman
- Darren Lavett as Stoner Cop
- Tony Maxwell as Lane's Guest

Notes:

- Singer/songwriter Elliott Smith, who has a cameo role as the bus driver, also wrote two exclusive songs for the film.
- Southlander marked the film debut of Laura Prepon.

== Soundtrack ==
- "Southlander Theme"
- "Illumination Dub" – Beth Orton, Eddie Ruscha
- "Dr. Fantasm" – Eddie Ruscha
- "Making Out" – Eddie Ruscha
- "Green Room" – Billy Higgins, Jeffery Littleton, Kito Gamble, Azar Lawrence, Richard Grant
- "Speedway Child" – Eddie Ruscha
- "Taste It" – Eddie Ruscha, Ross Harris
- "End of the Century" (Jennifer Herrema, Neil Hagerty) – Royal Trux
- "Space Kat" – Eddie Ruscha
- "Video City Boy" (C. Borrell, Ross Harris) – DJ Me DJ You
- "A Life Story" – Union 13
- "Rust Drive" – Eddie Ruscha
- "Elemental Blues" – Eddie Ruscha
- "Motherchild Theme" – Eddie Ruscha
- "Zu Zu Dubrider" – Eddie Ruscha
- "Piano Drop" – Ross Harris
- "Puttin' It Down" (Beck Hansen) – Beck
- "Seven Equals Five" – A. Spiegelman, B. Reynolds, Bill Dusha
- "Spa" (C. Borrell, Ross Harris) – DJ Me DJ You
- "Lane's World" – Eddie Ruscha
- "Solar Invocation" – Eddie Ruscha
- "Gently Waves" – Takako Minekawa
- "Broken Train" (Beck Hansen) – Beck
- "Confederate Dub" – Eddie Ruscha
- "Alone and Dying" – Hank Williams III
- "Sweetest Decline" – Beth Orton
- "Fatter Cats Bigga Fish" – The Coup
- "Snowbunny's Serenade" – Elliott Smith
- "Motherchild Chase" – Eddie Ruscha
- "Splitsville" – Elliott Smith

Notes:

- Ed Ruscha Jr. is credited as Da Da Munchamonkey in the film.
- "Sweetest Decline" is erroneously listed as "Central Reservation" in the DVD liner notes.
- "Snowbunny's Serenade" is an alternate version of Elliott Smith's song "Bye" (from Figure 8), played on a different keyboard.
