= Spencer (TV series) =

- Also known as: Under One Roof
- Genre: Sitcom
- Created by: Sy Rosen
- Starring: Chad Lowe (episodes 1–6); Ross Harris (episodes 7–13)
- Composer: Barry Goldberg
- Country of origin: United States
- Original language: English
- No. of seasons: 1
- No. of episodes: 13

Production
- Producer: Mort Lachman
- Running time: 30 minutes
- Production companies: Mort Lachman and Associates; Alan Landsburg Productions

Original release
- Network: NBC
- Release: December 1, 1984 – May 11, 1985

Spencer, later titled Under One Roof, is an American sitcom television series created by Sy Rosen, that was broadcast on NBC for one season from December 1, 1984 until May 11, 1985.

== History and description ==
The show originally starred Chad Lowe as high school student Spencer Winger, Mimi Kennedy as his mother Doris Winger, and Ronny Cox as his father George Winger.

Lowe left the series in 1985 after six episodes and was replaced by Ross Harris, who assumed the role of Spencer. At that time the show's title was changed from Spencer to Under One Roof; the first episode with the new title aired March 23, 1985. Cox also left the show during the retooling, his character written off as having left the family for a 23-year-old woman. Harold Gould and Frances Sternhagen were added to the cast as Spencer's maternal grandparents. Richard Sanders played the high school guidance counselor in the series. Each episode would open with Spencer making some wisecrack in class, causing the teacher to send him to his guidance counselor.

== Cast ==
- Chad Lowe as Spencer Winger (1984)
- Ross Harris as Spencer Winger (1985)
- Mimi Kennedy as Doris Winger
- Ronny Cox as George Winger
- Amy Locane as Andrea Winger
- Grant Heslov as Wayne
- David Greenlee as (Herbie) Bailey (pilot episode)
- Dean Cameron as Bailey (episode 2 on)
- Frances Sternhagen as Millie Sprague
- Harold Gould as Ben Sprague
- Richard Sanders as Benjamin Beanley
- Beverly Archer as Miss Spier

== Episodes ==
No.	Title	Directed by	Written by	Original release date
1	"Pilot"	Bill Persky	Sy Rosen	December 1, 1984
Spencer Winger, the typical American teenager constantly getting into trouble, decides to free the school's laboratory mice.
2	"The Divorcee"	Unknown	Unknown	December 8, 1984
Spencer – for once being pursued by a female – is more nervous than delighted, since his admirer is a divorced friend of his mother's.
3	"Spencer Joins the Army"	John Tracy	Chet Dowling, Sandy Krinski	December 15, 1984
When Spencer, Wayne and Bailey are expelled for cheating, they try to enlist in the Army.
4	"Fast Times"	Unknown	Unknown	December 22, 1984
Spencer seeks a date with Marsha (Olivia Barash), a girl with a certain reputation, in hopes of losing his virginity.
5	"The World's Worst Date"	Lila Garrett	Shelly Zellman	December 29, 1984
On New Year's Eve, Spencer has a blind date with a pretty but comically tall girl (Terry Farrell). Meanwhile, Wayne and Bailey find themselves locked in at the high school after their dates stand them up.
6	"The Drive-In"	Lila Garrett	Chet Dowling, Sandy Krinski, Judy Merl	January 12, 1985
Spencer feels a bit uptight when his best friend Wayne asks his little sister out on a date.
7	"The Grandparents Move In"	John Tracy	Chet Dowling, Sandy Krinski	March 23, 1985
8	"Millie's Affair"	John Tracy	Sybil Adelman, Martin Sage	March 30, 1985
Millie renews her acquaintance with an old flame (Philip Sterling), while Doris tries to keep the truth from Ben.
9	"Voices in the Hall"	John Tracy	Jerry Ross	April 6, 1985
10	"Doris and the Tutor"	John Tracy	Neil Rosen, George Tricker	April 13, 1985
11	"Crazy Girl"	Lila Garrett	James Berg, Stan Zimmerman	April 20, 1985
12	"Wayne's Nose Job"	Lila Garrett	Bob Bendetson, Howard Bendetson	May 4, 1985
On his birthday, Wayne decides to get a nose job to make himself more attractive to girls.
13	"Grandpa the Lover"	Lila Garrett	Pamela Chais	May 11, 1985
