= Lucky Three =

- Directed by: Jem Cohen
- Starring: Elliott Smith
- Music by: Elliott Smith
- Distributed by: Kill Rock Stars
- Release date: 1997
- Running time: 11 min.
- Country: United States
- Language: English

Lucky Three (or Lucky Three: An Elliott Smith Portrait) is a 1997 11-minute short film directed by Jem Cohen and featuring singer-songwriter Elliott Smith.

== Filming ==
Lucky Three was filmed from October 17–20, 1996 in Portland, Oregon.

== Content ==
The film features Elliott Smith playing acoustic songs. These include: an instrumental based on what became "Baby Britain", at the beginning and between the last two songs; "Between the Bars"; "Thirteen" (Big Star cover); and "Angeles". Parts of the film were filmed around the Lovejoy Columns.

== Release ==
Lucky Three was released in 1997. It is available on Kill Rock Stars' now-out-of-print 1999 Video Fanzine #1 release.
