= Either/Or (restaurant) =

Restaurant in Portland, Oregon, U.S.

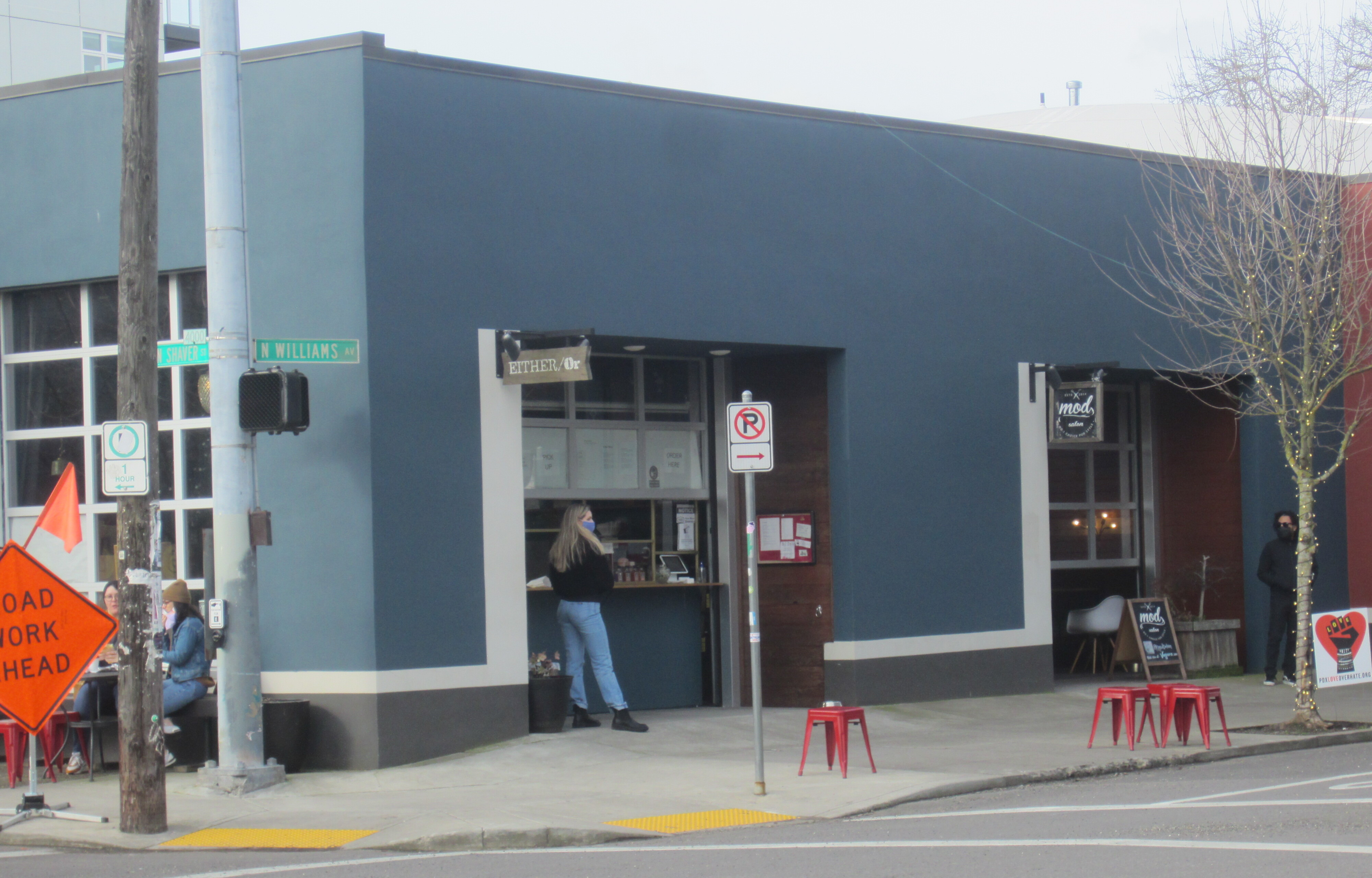
- Exterior of the location in Portland, Oregon's Boise's neighborhood, February 2021
- Interactive map of Either/Or

Restaurant information
- Location: 4003 North Williams Avenue, Portland, Oregon, United States
- Coordinates: 45°33′7.8″N 122°40′1″W
- Website: eitherorpdx.com

Either/Or (sometimes Either/Or Cafe) is a restaurant in Portland, Oregon, United States. The business operates on North Williams Avenue in the Boise neighborhood; the original location, in southeast Portland's Sellwood-Moreland neighborhood, closed during the COVID-19 pandemic.

== Description ==
Either/Or is a restaurant on North Williams Avenue in Portland's Boise neighborhood. Previously, Either/Or's original location operated in southeast Portland's Sellwood-Moreland neighborhood. The business's name refers to Elliott Smith's 1997 studio album of the same name. Either/Or is queer-owned, has a large LGBTQ clientele, and is "designed for all marginalized populations to feel at home", according to Jack Rushall of Willamette Week. The restaurant has been described as a "queer space".

The business has operated as a coffee shop during the day and a cocktail bar at night. The "Chinese-influenced" menu has included breakfast sandwiches, noodle bowls with sausage or tofu, as well as vegan "fried chicken" sandwiches. The drink menu has included Aperol spritzes, mimosas, coffee soda, and cocktails which include coffee. The Salty Russian is reminiscent of a White Russian.

Either/Or has also served chai lattes, and has used Heart Coffee Roasters. The restaurant has also made caramel, orgeat (almond/orange), and vanilla syrups in-house.

== History ==
Ro Tam is an owner. The original location in Sellwood-Moreland closed during the COVID-19 pandemic. The Sellwood-Moreland location also operated as a tea bar, and Tam is also the owner of Tanglewood Beverage Company.

In 2023, Eater Portland editor Brooke Jackson-Glidden received the James Beard Foundation's Jonathan Gold Local Voice Award in part for her essay about Either/Or. The restaurant participated in Portland's Dumpling Week in 2026.

== See also ==
- Impact of the COVID-19 pandemic on the restaurant industry in the United States
- List of coffeehouse chains
