= Brooke Jackson-Glidden =

American food writer (born 1990s)

Brooke Jackson-Glidden (born 1994 or 1995) is an American food writer who is the editor of Eater Portland. In 2023, she received the Jonathan Gold Local Voice Award from the James Beard Foundation in part for her essay about Either/Or.

Jackson-Glidden has been the editor of Eater Portland since 2018. Previously, she was an intern at Boston magazine in 2015 and 2016. She has also written about the food industry for the Statesman Journal (Salem, Oregon). Jackson-Glidden was raised in Oregon. She lives in North Portland, as of 2022. Jackson-Glidden was an emcee during Drag-a-thon, a record-setting drag show, in 2023. Jackson-Glidden was named editor-and-chief of Portland Monthly in 2024, but was laid off two years later.
