= Little, Big, and Far =

Little Big and Far is a 2024 documentary film directed by Jem Cohen. A hybrid fiction-nonfiction film, it follows an Austrian astronomer named Karl who after turning 70 and self reflecting on his life, travels to a mountain on an island in Greece to seek out a dark place to view the stars.
