= Between the Bars =

1997 song by Elliott Smith

Song by Elliott Smith

from the album Either/Or
- Released: February 25, 1997
- Genre: Indie folk; lo-fi
- Length: 2:21
- Label: Kill Rock Stars
- Songwriter: Smith
- Producers: Smith, Tom Rothrock, Rob Schnapf

"Between the Bars" is a song by American singer-songwriter Elliott Smith from his third studio album Either/Or. It is one of three tracks from Either/Or that was used in the soundtrack of Good Will Hunting (1997). It is also featured in the 2012 indie film Stuck in Love and in the seventh episode of season two of Rick and Morty. A cover version of the song performed by Chris Garneau was used in Pedro Almodovar's film La piel que habito (The skin I live in) in 2012.

== Reception ==
Pitchfork said the song, "conceals its desperate melancholy within a lilting melody that never stops moving forward. Like all of the late songwriter's best songs, this one contains layers; what seems at first like a comforting lullaby to a troubled lover reveals itself, on repeated listens, to describe the seductive promise of alcoholism."

Additionally, Elizabeth Newton’s 2010 thesis, Between the Bars: The Early Musical Language of Elliott Smith (University of Puget Sound), examines the song’s musical style, influences, and significance, providing an in-depth academic analysis that underscores its enduring artistic and cultural resonance.

== Covers ==
Madonna covered the song in her short film, secretprojectrevolution in 2013.
