= Pretty (Ugly Before) =

Single by Elliott Smith

from the album From a Basement on the Hill
- B-side: "A Distorted Reality Is Now a Necessity to Be Free"
- Released: 2003
- Genre: Indie rock
- Length: 4:40
- Label: Suicide Squeeze
- Songwriter: Elliott Smith

Elliott Smith singles chronology
"Son of Sam" (2000)	"Pretty (Ugly Before)" (2003)

"Pretty (Ugly Before)" is a song by American singer-songwriter Elliott Smith. It was released as a limited-edition 7" vinyl single in 2003 by record label Suicide Squeeze, Smith's final single released during his lifetime. It was later re-released by Domino in 2004, and appeared on Smith's posthumous final album, From a Basement on the Hill.

The song features (post-bridge) backing vocals from Smith's former Heatmiser bandmate Sam Coomes.

The single was also featured on a compilation release from Planned Parenthood that featured songs from musicians such as Björk, Bon Iver, Sleater-Kinney, Foo Fighters, The National’s Matt Berninger and Bryce Dessner. It was a live, unreleased version of "Pretty (Ugly Before)" that had been recorded at the Largo in Los Angeles.

== Release ==
"Pretty (Ugly Before)" was released as a limited-edition of 7" vinyl single in August 2003 by record label Suicide Squeeze.

The initial edition of 5,000 quickly sold out following Smith's death two months later. By March 2004, the label began selling an identical repress of the single, this time advertised as a limited edition of 10,000 copies, announcing on their website: “If you missed out on the first pressing, here’s your chance to make good and own this classic release.”

Suicide Squeeze has subsequently reissued the single several times since 2015 in various limited edition colored vinyl editions.

The single did not chart in the United States. It was re-released in 2004 by record label Domino, reaching number 85 in the UK Singles Chart, and appeared on Smith's posthumous final album, From a Basement on the Hill. An alternate version of the single's B-side, "A Distorted Reality Is Now a Necessity to Be Free", also appears on the album.

== Recording ==
"Pretty (Ugly Before)" was recorded at Fort Apache Studios in Cambridge, Massachusetts, by engineer Matthew Ellard and assisted by Andrew Beckman, while Elliott was on tour with his band. Beckman recalls "Elliott was very shy at first and kept his distance. Once we started talking about gear, he opened up quickly. He was excited about the Line 6 delay pedal he was using for the backwards delay at the end of the song. During the first take, I gave him a huge thumbs up and he couldn't help but smile."

The Mellotron-like keyboard part during the intro was created using a Casio SK-1 sampler, which the keyboard player Aaron Embry sang one note into then spread the sample out across the keyboard. Because the SK-1 has no internal storage, he had to do this every time he wanted to use the sound. "I remember scrambling around trying to find a combination of adapters that would allow us to get a mini sized output from the Casio into our Neve 8078 console. Thankfully we got it working, as the sound is haunting and a perfect intro to this amazing tune," remembered Beckman.

Smith recorded his vocals alone in the control room on a Neumann U67 mic while the band and crew enjoyed a dinner in the adjacent kitchen.

== Track listing ==
All tracks are written by Elliott Smith.

Side A
No.	Title	Length
1.	"Pretty (Ugly Before)"	4:40

Side B
No.	Title	Length
1.	"A Distorted Reality Is Now a Necessity to Be Free"	3:06
