= Happiness (Elliott Smith song) =

2000 song by Elliott Smith

Single by Elliott Smith

from the album Figure 8
- B-side: "Son of Sam (acoustic version)"
- Released: February 8, 2000
- Genre: Indie rock; power pop
- Length: 5:15 (single version); 5:04 (album version)
- Label: DreamWorks; Cavity Search
- Songwriter: Elliott Smith
- Producers: Elliott Smith; Tom Rothrock; Rob Schnapf

Elliott Smith singles chronology
"Baby Britain" (1999)	"Happiness" (2000)	"Son of Sam" (2000)

"Happiness" is a song by American singer-songwriter Elliott Smith. It was released on February 8, 2000 by record label DreamWorks as the first single from his fifth studio album, Figure 8. It was also released on 7-inch vinyl by Cavity Search.

== Recording and content ==
Jon Brion sings backup vocals on "Happiness".

On early recording reels, the song was labeled as "Tom's Start".

== Release ==
"Happiness" was released on February 8, 2000 by record label DreamWorks as the first single from his fifth studio album, Figure 8. The single did not chart in the United States.

The single version is a slightly different mix of the song that was released on the album. On Figure 8, the track is labeled as "Happiness/The Gondola Man", due to the short instrumental that plays after "Happiness" ends. On the single, an entirely different instrumental follows the song, a reversed clip of "Take a Fall", recorded in Smith's early duo A Murder of Crows. This song shouldn't be confused with other similarly-named Smith songs, like "Taking a Fall" and "How to Take a Fall".

== Critical reception ==
CMJ New Music Report wrote, "While the tune's production recalls the shimmer of XO, it possesses curiously upbeat energy atypical for Smith".

== Track listing ==
No.	Title	Length
1.	"Happiness (single version)"	5:15
2.	"Son of Sam (acoustic version)"	3:05

== Personnel ==
- Elliott Smith – vocals, guitars, bass, drums, piano, organ, marching drum
- Jon Brion – backing vocals
