= Waltz 2 (XO) =

1998 single by Elliott Smith

"Waltz #2 (XO)"

Single by Elliott Smith

from the album XO
- B-side: "Our Thing": "How to Take a Fall"
- Released: September 21, 1998
- Genre: Indie pop; alternative rock; orchestral pop
- Length: 4:40
- Label: DreamWorks
- Songwriter(s): Elliott Smith
- Producer(s): Elliott Smith; Tom Rothrock; Rob Schnapf

Elliott Smith singles chronology
"Miss Misery" (1997)	"Waltz #2 (XO)" (1998)	"Baby Britain" (1999)

"Waltz #2 (XO)" is a song by American singer-songwriter Elliott Smith. It was released in 1998 by record label DreamWorks as the first single from his fourth studio album, XO.

== Release ==
The single did not chart in the United States but reached number 52 in the UK Singles Chart, his highest chart placement in the UK to date.

== Reception ==
In its article on the song, Slate called it Elliott Smith's best song.

Pitchfork said, "Inside a smoky karaoke bar, a man and a woman—two people who may very well be stand-ins for Elliott Smith's mother, Bunny, and his stepfather, Charlie—select songs that thinly veil their marital strife. She blankly performs the humiliating "Cathy's Clown", he sings the pointed "You're No Good". Smith uses karaoke night to give us this meta novella about pop music and heartbreak."

== Cover versions ==
The song was covered by Kiki and Herb in their 2016 cabaret show Kiki & Herb: Seeking Asylum! at Joe's Pub, and by Canadian singer-songwriter Dan Mangan on his 2020 covers album Thief.

== Track listing ==
No.	Title	Length
1.	"Waltz #2 (XO)"	4:35
2.	"Our Thing"	2:57
3.	"How to Take a Fall" (CD edition only)	2:52
