= Future Pigeon =

Future Pigeon is an American punk/dub band from Los Angeles, California, contemporary to the late 1990s and early 2000s. The band is composed of Eddie Rucha on bass, Brandon Wells on percussion, Lindsey Glover on drums, Jason Mason on skank guitar, Jeremy Carins on fiddle, Jeff Carins on electric guitar, Danny Preston on keyboards, Slim on trumpet and Liam Philpot on sax.

== History ==
Future Pigeon are an award-winning underground band from LA; they are often associated in performances with other more famous members of that scene such as the late Elliott Smith, Smokey Hormel, Hank Williams III, and others. For example, Future Pigeon performed at Elliott Smith's memorial concert. Future Pigeon also performed a dub version of Elliott Smith's "Waltz No. 2 (XO)" for the short film/documentary Strange Parallel.

Future Pigeon are also featured in the movie Southlander (which also features Elliott Smith, in a small role as a bus driver). The semi-fictional Future Pigeon of that film includes Beth Orton ("Rocket") as lead vocalist.

The song "Evil" appeared in an episode of Weeds in September 2007. After the episode, the song appeared on the iTunes most downloaded list. Keyboardist, Danny Preston is now performing as Rainbow Arabia with his wife, Tiffany.

Also their song "Gift Tax" has appeared on the video game Tony Hawk's Proving Ground.
