= Museum Hours =

- Theatrical release poster
- Directed by: Jem Cohen
- Written by: Jem Cohen
- Produced by: Jem Cohen; Paolo Calamita; Gabriele Kranzelninder; Guy Picciotto; Patti Smith
- Starring: Mary Margaret O'Hara; Bobby Sommer
- Cinematography: Jem Cohen; Peter Roehsler
- Edited by: Jem Cohen; Marc Vives
- Music by: Mary Margaret O'Hara
- Production companies: Gravity Hill Films; Little Magnet Films; KGP Kranzelbinder Gabriele Production
- Distributed by: The Cinema Guild (US); Soda Pictures (UK)
- Release dates: 8 August 2012 (Locarno); 28 June 2013 (United States); 6 September 2013 (United Kingdom)
- Running time: 106 minutes
- Countries: Austria; United States
- Languages: German; English
- Box office: $554,361

Museum Hours is a 2012 Austrian-American drama film written and directed by Jem Cohen. The film is set in and around Vienna's Kunsthistorisches Museum.

== Plot ==
When a Vienna museum guard befriends an enigmatic visitor, the grand Kunsthistorisches Museum becomes a crossroads that sparks explorations of their lives, the city, and the ways art reflects and shapes the world.

One Vienna winter, Johann, a guard at the grand Kunsthistorisches Museum encounters Anne, a visitor called to Austria for a family medical emergency. Never having been to Austria and with little money, she wanders the city in limbo, taking the museum as her refuge. Johann, initially wary, offers help, and they're drawn into each other's worlds. Their meeting sparks an unexpected series of explorations – of their own lives and the life of the city, and of the way artwork can reflect and shape daily experience.

While standing guard at the Bruegel exhibit at the museum, the security guard views a tour guide leading a discussion of whether Bruegel could be assessed as a religious man on the basis of his rendering of various religious subjects in his paintings. One museum visitor states that he must have been 'devoutly religious' to paint with such passion. The tour guide points out that, in her opinion, Bruegel was consistent in understating the main religious subjects in his paintings by giving equal if not greater pictorial space to seemingly trivial subjects matter in comparison to seemingly 'main' religious subjects studied in particular oil paintings.

The museum is seen not as an archaic institution of historical artifacts, but as an enigmatic crossroads in which, through the art, a discussion takes place across time with vital implications in the contemporary world. The "conversations" embodied in the museum's collection revolve around the matters that most concern us: death, sex, history, theology, materialism, and so on. It's through the regular lives of the guard and displaced visitor that these heady subjects are brought down to earth and made manifest. Near the film's end, Johann and Anne are exploring on the fringe of the city when her ill cousin's condition reaches a crisis point. While standing by the car with Johann, Johann takes a call from the doctor on his mobile and after the call relates to her the news that he is very sorry to inform her of the demise of her loved one.

== Cast ==
- Mary Margaret O'Hara as Anne
- Bobby Sommer as Johann
- Ela Piplits as Gerda Pachner

== Release ==
Museum Hours premiered at the 2012 Locarno International Film Festival, had its North American premiere within the 2012 Toronto International Film Festival, and screened within such U.S. film festivals as South by Southwest and Maryland Film Festival.

The film was acquired for U.S. distribution by The Cinema Guild.

== Awards and nominations ==
=== Film ===
Year	Award	Category	Result
2014	Independent Spirit Awards	John Cassavetes Award	Nominated
2014	Independent Spirit Awards	Best Editing	Nominated
