= Son of Sam (song) =

Single by Elliott Smith

from the album Figure 8
- B-side: "A Living Will"
- Released: April 11, 2000
- Genre: Power pop
- Length: 3:04
- Label: DreamWorks
- Songwriter(s): Elliott Smith
- Producer(s): Elliott Smith; Tom Rothrock; Rob Schnapf

Elliott Smith singles chronology
"Happiness" (2000)	"Son of Sam" (2000)	"Pretty (Ugly Before)" (2003)

"Son of Sam" is a song by American singer-songwriter Elliott Smith. It was released on April 11, 2000, by record label DreamWorks as the second and final single from his fifth studio album, Figure 8.

== Content ==
The song was not about the real life "Son of Sam", serial killer David Berkowitz. Smith explained, "It's not about the serial killer. I'm not sure exactly what it's about because it's just sort of like telling someone a dream you had last night. There are some destructive figures in it, 'Son of Sam', Shiva... but Shiva's also associated with creativity... I'm not sure... it's just an impressionistic song about destruction and creativity, I guess, if it's about anything."

== Release ==
"Son of Sam" was released on April 11, 2000 and is the second and final single released from Figure 8. The single did not chart in the United States but reached number 55 in the UK Singles Chart.

An acoustic version appears as a B-side on Smith's first single from Figure 8, "Happiness".

== Music video ==
A music video was directed by Autumn de Wilde for the song, featuring intermittent black and white stop frames. Smith is seen following a red balloon that moves by itself; this concept resembles that of the 1956 French film The Red Balloon, although de Wilde notes in the photo-book Elliott Smith that the video was inspired by the 1962 French film La jetée. The video opens with whispers by Pascal Nabet Meyer and Autumn de Wilde.

In an interview Smith said, "The person who did 'Son of Sam' is a friend of mine. I didn't want some hot shit Hollywood guy to make God knows what. My friend Autumn, who is a photographer, had never made a film before, but she was very interested in doing it, so she came up with an idea. It was fun because I knew her, and I liked and respected her pictures."

== Live performances ==
Elliott performed "Son of Sam" live on tour in support of Figure 8, both with an electric band and solo with an acoustic guitar. Notably, he performed it with a band on Late Night with Conan O'Brien on April 21, 2000.

== Track listing ==
CD

No.	Title	Length
1.	"Son of Sam"	3:03
2.	"A Living Will"	2:29
3.	"Figure 8 (Bob Dorough)"	1:31

7" vinyl

No.	Title	Length
1.	"Son of Sam"	2:59
2.	"A Living Will"	2:23

== Personnel ==
- Elliott Smith – vocals, guitars, bass, drums, piano, organ
