= Ross Harris (actor) =

American actor

- Born: Richard R. Harris; March 13, 1969 (age 57); Ventura, California, United States
- Occupations: Actor, musician, artist
- Years active: 1975–2001
- Children: 2
- Website: Website

Richard R. Harris (born March 13, 1969), better known by his nickname, Ross Harris, is an American former actor, artist, and musician.

== Early life ==
Richard R. Harris was born in Ventura, California.

== Career ==
=== Acting ===
He began acting at age six. He appeared in over 100 commercials in the 1970s. In 1979, at the age of 10, Ross landed the role of Joey in the classic comedy feature film Airplane!, notably in a scene with Kareem Abdul-Jabbar and Peter Graves. Ross went on to co-star in the Academy Award-nominated drama Testament as well as roles on The Love Boat, CHiPs, Little House on the Prairie, Hart to Hart, T.J. Hooker, and many more.

In March 1985, he replaced Chad Lowe in the starring role on the NBC sitcom Spencer, which was retooled following Lowe's sudden departure; it returned under the new title Under One Roof. Harris also appeared, as "Ross Angeles", on MTV's Jackass, in the "Big Wheel Craze" segment, alongside friend Dave England.

=== Music, photography, and video career ===
Harris was part of the Camarillo, California space-age electronic 1990s music act Sukia. Taking their name from an X-rated Italian comic book of the same name, Sukia was notable for their crazy, often perverse live shows, which sometimes featured a naked saxophone player. Sukia toured the world with acts like Beck and Stereolab, and subsequently put out one album on the Dust Brothers' fledgling label Nickel Bag Records in 1997. The album, Contacto Espacial con el Tercer Sexo (Space Contact with the Third Sex), was produced by the Dust Brothers and Jerry Finn.

After Sukia dissolved, Harris formed DJ Me DJ You with Sukia cohort Craig Borrell. More sample-heavy and straightforward musically than Sukia, DJ Me DJ You relied on sampling from their endless collection of obscure records along with live instrumentation as the basis of their songs. They put out two records, Rainbows and Robots (2000) on Emperor Norton Records and Can You See the Music (2003) on Eenie Meenie Records.

Amidst musical projects, Harris also worked as a music video director and photographer. He directed two music videos for Elliott Smith – one for "Coming Up Roses", from Smith's 1995 self-titled album, and another for Smith's Academy Award-nominated song "Miss Misery", from the Good Will Hunting soundtrack. (Harris also directed the music video for the song "Plainclothes Man" by Heatmiser, Smith's previous band.) Harris was the photographer for Beck's first two albums and performed on them as well, including the Grammy-winning Odelay.

These successes allowed him to begin yet another career as a record producer, recording works for Virgin, Capitol, and PolyGram. As a remixer, he has worked for Beth Orton, Beck, The Dust Brothers, The Prodigy, Fantastic Plastic Machine, and many others. His music has been featured on Malcolm in the Middle, Roswell, and Kissing Jessica Stein.

As a performer with both Sukia and DJ Me DJ You, he has traveled as far as Moscow and Tokyo to play to a growing underground audience.

2003 saw the release of the feature film Southlander: Diary of a Desperate Musician, co-written with director Steve Hanft. In addition to Harris' role as "Ross Angeles", it stars Rory Cochrane, Lawrence Hilton-Jacobs, Laura Prepon, Beck, Hank Williams III, and features the final recorded live performance of jazz drummer Billy Higgins.

Harris spearheaded the benefit album Dimension Mix, which pays tribute to children's electronic music pioneers Bruce Haack and Esther Nelson. The album was a culmination of over 5 years of work for Harris, who produced and compiled the project. It features a song by Beck, which Harris produced and engineered. The project also includes songs and remixes by Stereolab, Eels, Money Mark, The Apples in Stereo, and many more. All proceeds from the album go to Cure Autism Now.

Harris works as a director, editor, and director of photography. He has contributed to advertising campaigns for Honda, Acura, Ray-Ban, Levi's, and the children's television show Yo Gabba Gabba.

== Bibliography ==
- Holmstrom, John. The Moving Picture Boy: An International Encyclopaedia from 1895 to 1995. Norwich, Michael Russell, 1996, p. 374.
