= David McConnell (musician) =

American musician and record producer

David McConnell is a southern Californian musician, formerly known for his involvement as collaborator, producer and engineer for Elliott Smith's final album, From a Basement on the Hill as well as his involvement with the Summer Hymns and Folk Implosion/ Lou Barlow of Dinosaur JR.. Since 2004 he has become noted in the contemporary art world as a musician, composer and producer who uses his past experience in music culture as a vocabulary in his visual and installation based art work.

David McConnell's paintings and installations balance representation and abstraction, peppered with references to the 20th-century art avant-garde, religious iconography and symbolic imagery of his musical background as a producer and composer. In 2011, he started to translate his production techniques of sound into his visual work by painting sound waves for music either composed by himself or written by artists as varied as Handel to Neil Young. In addition McConnell expanded the visual vocabulary by "sampling" the work of previous visual artists in new visual contexts in his canvases. His work has veered toward social motives in 2014 with direct references to responsible food practices, land use and consumer ideology associated with his solo exhibition "Frontier Thesis" at Flanders Gallery in Raleigh, NC.

After the birth of his son in 2010, McConnell began a quest to understand more about food culture, healthy eating/ cooking and responsible consumer practices related to food. This research led to a largely “corporate-free” sustainably farmed and foraged diet for his son and himself and also provided inspiration for imagery that has worked its way into his video and two-dimensional work. In addition, he has included elements such as wood and fabrics into his mixed media canvases as polarized expression of the hand made format. McConnell's installation work has been the focus of his public exposure as an artist, experienced by over one million viewers, in addition to his numerous sound recordings and film compositions.

McConnell began his career as a songwriter and record producer in Los Angeles where he made music for labels such as Virgin Records and DreamWorks but the industry apparently deemed his work too experimental or avant-garde to be commercially successful. McConnell exited the commercial music world and entered the visual art world after leaving his native California in 2004.

McConnell's work has been discussed or featured in publications such as Spin Magazine, The Boston Globe, The San Francisco Bay Guardian and on NPR. In 2012 McConnell won the North Carolina Artist Fellowship Award. His work has been exhibited at notable private galleries around the US and major Museums such as the Nasher Museum of Art at Duke University, The Institute of Contemporary art Boston, The Miami Art MuseumThe Henry Gallery at The University of Washington, Seattle and The Contemporary Art Museum, Raleigh.

In August 2014 McConnell presented "Frontier Thesis" at Flanders Gallery in Raleigh, NC as his most ambitious public presentation of work to date. The exhibition, largely based on over two years of research into American History, its iconography and its relation to lost or misunderstood cultural tradition presents a unique perspective into the current digital era of abbreviated social interaction and consumer practices.
