= Stuck in Love (film) =

- Theatrical release poster
- Directed by: Josh Boone
- Written by: Josh Boone
- Produced by: Judy Cairo
- Starring: Jennifer Connelly; Greg Kinnear; Lily Collins; Nat Wolff; Logan Lerman; Kristen Bell
- Cinematography: Tim Orr
- Edited by: Robb Sullivan
- Music by: Mike Mogis; Nathaniel Walcott
- Production companies: Informant Media; MICA Entertainment
- Distributed by: Millennium Entertainment
- Release dates: September 9, 2012 (TIFF); July 5, 2013 (US)
- Running time: 96 minutes
- Country: United States
- Language: English
- Box office: $977,671

Stuck in Love is a 2012 American romantic comedy-drama film written and directed by Josh Boone in his directorial debut. The independent film stars Jennifer Connelly, Greg Kinnear, Lily Collins, Nat Wolff, and Logan Lerman. It focuses on the complicated relationships between a successful novelist, played by Kinnear, his ex-wife (Connelly), their college daughter (Collins), and their teenage son (Wolff). The film began a limited theatrical release in the United States on July 5, 2013.

== Plot ==
Novelist and teacher Bill Borgens still misses Erica, who left him for Martin two years ago. Instead of writing, he spies on them while "jogging". Their teenage son Rusty is secretly infatuated with his classmate Kate, and their cynical, college-aged daughter Sam prefers one-night stands to relationships.

On Thanksgiving, Bill still sets Erica a place. Over dinner, Sam announces publication of her first novel. Bill is thrilled, as he has raised them to be writers, but upset he did not help her with it. Rusty goes to a second dinner with Erica and Martin, but Sam refuses, citing Erica's betrayal.

At a bar, after Sam's classmate Lou warns her about a sleaze, he himself persists and they go for coffee. Discussing favorite books, Sam is unnerved by their similar tastes so bolts, fearing a relationship. When Lou does not come to their writing seminar, she finds him at his dying mother's house.

Sam, seeing Lou's vulnerability, goes out with him. Discussing her novel, she explains Erica openly cuckholded Bill. Listening to Lou's favorite song, "Between the Bars" by Elliott Smith, Sam begins to cry, afraid he will hurt her. Lou promises he will not, and they kiss.

Rusty reads a poem in class, which is about Kate. As Bill pays his children to write frequently in their journals, he reads Rusty's to check on his progress. When caught, Bill suggests he really experience life to become a better writer.

Inadvertently seeing Kate doing cocaine at her boyfriend Glen's party, Rusty and his friend Jason start to leave. When Glen hits her, Rusty punches him and the three flee. Bruised and high, Rusty brings her home. As he is tucking Kate into bed, she guesses his poem was about her, they kiss and begin a relationship. On Christmas Day, they have sex in his closet so it is memorable. Rusty gives Kate a copy of his favorite novel, It, and she gives him her favorite album. Being an addict, Erica catches her eyeing her medications.

Bill has trysts and jogs with his married neighbor Tricia, but still mopes over Erica. While Christmas shopping he runs into her and, over coffee, says he would be a much better husband if they tried again. Tricia helps Bill create an online dating profile. After an okay date, he stops to leave his wedding ring at Erica's but changes his mind after seeing her reading his book.

At Sam's book-launch, Bill makes a speech about the writing process. Lou invites Erica, who is uncomfortable, but Bill encourages her to talk to Sam. When Erica tries, she barely acknowledges her. Sam breaks up with Lou for inviting Erica.

Sam unwittingly gives the alcoholic Kate champagne, who becomes incapacitated after mixing drugs and alcohol. Sam's classmate Gus takes her home, where Bill and Erica discover the unconscious Kate, raped. Devastated, Rusty goes on a drunken binge. While at a convenience store with Jason he runs into Glen, who beats him up. Kate apologizes to Rusty from rehab, hoping she will deserve him one day.

A concerned Bill suggests Rusty channel his pain into his writing, who then gets grounded when he asks if he did the same with Erica. The resulting story is entitled after I've Just Seen a Face" (which he hears when thinking of Kate). Later, his favorite author Stephen King calls, as Sam gave it to him, who gets it published in The Magazine of Fantasy and Science Fiction.

A frustrated Sam tells Bill to forget about Erica. He then admits to having left them for six months when she was an infant so, as she had waited for him, he had promised to do the same for Erica. When Lou calls Sam upon his mother's death, she realizes both her own mistakes and that she loves her mother. She reconciles with Erica, gets back together with Lou and supports him through his mother's death.

A year later, Bill has not set a place for Erica for Thanksgiving. A less cynical Sam is still with Lou. As they sit down, Erica comes and tearfully asks to join them. Shocked, Bill is happy she has finally come home. While the family celebrates, Bill narrates from What We Talk About When We Talk About Love.

== Cast ==
- Greg Kinnear as Bill Borgens
- Jennifer Connelly as Erica
- Lily Collins as Samantha Borgens
- Logan Lerman as Louis
- Nat Wolff as Rusty Borgens
- Kristen Bell as Tricia Walcott
- Liana Liberato as Kate
- Stephen King as himself (voice only)
- Spencer Breslin as Jason
- Patrick Schwarzenegger as Glen
- Rusty Joiner as Martin

== Production ==
Stuck in Love started shooting in Wilmington, North Carolina in March 2012, primarily in the Wrightsville Beach area. Filming wrapped on April 6, 2012.

On March 6, 2012, it was announced that Lily Collins, Logan Lerman, Liana Liberato, Nat Wolff and Kristen Bell had joined the cast. It was also announced that the film would feature a cameo from Stephen King, as well as actors Rusty Joiner and Patrick Schwarzenegger in supporting roles. In November, the working title of the movie, Writers, was changed to Stuck in Love. In Australia and New Zealand, it was released under the title A Place for Me and distributed by Becker Film Group.

== Reception ==
On review aggregator Rotten Tomatoes, the film holds an approval rating of 57% based on 42 reviews. The website's critics consensus reads: "It struggles to enliven its uneven script, but Stuck in Love boasts enough winning performances from its solid veteran cast to offer an appealing diversion for rom-com enthusiasts." One of top critics commented, "The story, while unsurprising, is also quietly satisfying." On Metacritic, the film has a weighted average score of 49 out of 100, based on 13 critics, indicating "mixed or average reviews".

== Soundtrack ==
Varèse Sarabande released the Stuck in Love – Original Motion Picture Soundtrack digitally on May 21 and on CD and vinyl June 11, 2013. The soundtrack features an original score by Mike Mogis and Nathaniel Walcott (from Bright Eyes), and new songs "At Your Door" (by Mike Mogis and Nathaniel Walcott featuring Big Harp), "You Are Your Mother's Child" (by Conor Oberst) and "Somersaults in Spring" (by Friends of Gemini: Corina Figueroa Escamilla, Nathaniel Walcott and Mike Mogis). Complete song track listing:

1. "Home" • Edward Sharpe and the Magnetic Zeros
2. "At Your Door" • Nathaniel Walcott and Mike Mogis featuring Big Harp
3. "You Are Your Mother's Child" • Conor Oberst
4. "American Man" • Rio Bravo
5. "Polkadot" • Like Pioneers
6. "Will You Be by Me" • Wallpaper Airplanes
7. "I Won't Love You Any Less" • Nat & Alex Wolff
8. "Between the Bars" • Elliott Smith
9. "The Calendar Hung Itself..." • Bright Eyes
10. "A Mountain, a Peak" • Bill Ricchini
11. "Somersaults in Spring" • Friends of Gemini
12. "Beach Baby" • Bon Iver
