= Jem Cohen =

American film director (born 1962)

- Born: Jem Alan Cohen; 1962 (age 63–64); Kabul, Afghanistan
- Occupation: Filmmaker

Jem Alan Cohen (born 1962) is an Afghan-born American filmmaker based in New York City. Cohen is especially known for his observational portraits of urban landscapes, blending of media formats (sixteen-millimetre, Super 8, videotape) and collaborations with musicians. He also makes multichannel installations and still photographs and had a photography show at Robert Miller Gallery in 2009. He is the recipient of the Independent Spirit Award for feature filmmaking, and has received grants from the Guggenheim, Creative Capital, Rockefeller and Alpert foundations, and the National Endowment for the Arts. Cohen's films have been broadcast internationally, and are in held the collections of the Museum of Modern Art, the Whitney Museum, the National Gallery of Art, and the ACMI in Melbourne.

== Early life ==
Cohen was born in Kabul, Afghanistan where his father was working for Columbia University, Teachers College and the United States Agency for International Development (U.S.A.I.D.). He graduated from Wesleyan University in 1984, with a concentration in film and photography.

== Career ==
Cohen found the mainstream Hollywood film industry incompatible with his sociopolitical and artistic views. By applying the D.I.Y. ethos of Punk Rock to his film-making approach, he crafted a distinct style in his films through various small gauge formats of Super 8, sixteen-millimetre, and videotape. In an interview with web-site The Lamp, Cohen said, "...it's very inspiring to me, to see people kind of take something outside of the industry, outside of the music industry, and it gave me something of a template to work in film outside of the film industry. And there are certainly strains of punk that are activist and that are kind of oppositional in nature to the dominant mainstream culture... that's very inspiring to me..."

Cohen's longer works include his feature film, Museum Hours, Chain, and the experimental documentary, Instrument, a portrait of the D.C. punk band Fugazi that was ten years in the making. Benjamin Smoke, about the life of the frontman of the Atlanta, Georgia band Smoke, covers a ten-year arc. Other works of note are Lost Book Found, his Walter Benjamin-inspired portrait of New York City, Buried in Light, a series of connected Central and Eastern European city portraits, and his short film about the late Elliott Smith, Lucky Three. In 2002, Cohen made Chain X Three, a precursor to the Chain feature film, which was exhibited as a three-channel installation. His concert film of the Dutch band The Ex, Building a Broken Mousetrap, premiered at the Toronto Film Festival in 2006.

Cohen was a resident at Eyebeam in 2002.

unseen unsaid, a 2015 film shot along Essex Road in London

In 2005, Cohen curated the four-day FUSEBOX Festival in Ghent, Belgium. A celebratory gathering "at the crossroads of film, music, and activism," participants included Guy Picciotto of Fugazi, Patti Smith and Tom Verlaine, The Evens, and a side project of Montreal's Thee Silver Mt. Zion Memorial Orchestra & Tra-La-La Band, called Thee Silver Mountain Elegies Play War Radio, which formed for the occasion.

== Filmography ==
- A Road in Florida (1983)
- Witness (1986)
- This Is a History of New York (The Golden Age of Reason) (1987)
- Selected City Films (1989)
- Talk About the Passion (1989) collaboration with R.E.M.
- You're the One Lee (1989) collaboration with Miracle Legion
- Glue Man (1989) collaboration with Fugazi
- Light Years (1989)
- Love Teller (1989) collaboration with Ben Katchor
- Never Change (1988) text by Blake Nelson
- 4:44 (from her house) (1989)
- What does Away Mean? PSA (1989)
- Marks Town (1991)
- Drink Deep (1991)
- Black Hole Radio (1992) single channel version and video installation
- Nightswimming (1993)
- Drift (1993)
- Buried in Light (1993)
- Sun Project (1994)
- Coney Island End of God the Way It Must Be (1996)
- Lost Book Found (1996)
- Lucky Three (1997)
- Amber City (1999)
- Instrument (1999)
- Blood Orange Sky (1999)
- Waterfront Diaries (New York) (2000)
- Little Flags (2000)
- Benjamin Smoke (2000)
- Nice Evening, Transmission Down (2001)
- George Thief (2002)
- The Foxx and Little Vic (2002)
- Cat Power: Live from Fur City (2002)
- Chain X Three (2002)
- Chain (2004)
- NYC Weights and Measures (2005)
- Blessed Are the Dreams of Men (2006)
- Building a Broken Mouse Trap (2006)
- Free (2007)
- Spirit (2007)
- Empires of Tin (2007)
- Long for the City (2008)
- Half the Battle (2008)
- The Passage Clock (For Walter Benjamin) (2008)
- Anne Truitt, Working (2009)
- Night Scene New York (2009,
- Le Bled (Buildings in a Field) (2009) with writer Lucy Sante
- One Bright Day (2009)
- Anecdotal Evidence (2009)
- Crossing Paths With Luce Vigo (2010)
- Gravity Hill NEWSREELS (2011/12)
- Museum Hours (2012)
- We Have an Anchor (2015)
- Counting (2015)
- On Essex Road (2016)
- Bury Me Not (2016)
- World Without End (No Reported Incidents) (2016)
- This Climate (2017)
- Birth Of A Nation (2017)
- Makeshift (For Mekas) (2019)
- Or Nothing (The Double) (2022)
- Ballad Of Philip Guston (2023)
- Little, Big, and Far (2024)
