= Baby Britain =

Single by Elliott Smith

from the album XO
- B-side: "Waltz #1 (demo)"
- Released: April 19, 1999
- Genre: Indie pop; baroque pop
- Length: 3:14
- Label: DreamWorks
- Songwriter: Elliott Smith
- Producers: Elliott Smith; Tom Rothrock; Rob Schnapf

Elliott Smith singles chronology
"Waltz #2 (XO)" (1998)	"Baby Britain" (1999)	"Happiness" (2000)

"Baby Britain" is a song by American singer-songwriter Elliott Smith. It was released in 1999 by record label DreamWorks as the second single from his fourth studio album, XO.

== Release ==
"Baby Britain" was released in 1999 by record label DreamWorks as the second single from his fourth studio album, XO. The single did not chart in the United States but reached number 55 in the UK Singles Chart.

== Music video ==
A music video, directed by Steve Hanft, was made for the song. In the video, Smith can be seen in a recording studio playing various instruments, including a guitar, piano, mandolin and drums. There is also footage of Smith playing live.

== Cover versions ==
The band Bayside covered "Baby Britain" on their 2006 album Acoustic. Seth Avett from the band Avett Brothers and Jessica Lea Mayfield covered "Baby Britain" in 2015 on the cover album Seth Avett & Jessica Lea Mayfield Sing Elliott Smith.

== Track listings ==
CD Single 1

No.	Title	Length
1.	"Baby Britain"	3:14
2.	"Waltz #1 (Demo)"	3:03
3.	"The Enemy Is You"	2:24
4.	"Bottle Up & Explode! (Early Version)"	2:38

CD Single 2

No.	Title	Length
1.	"Baby Britain"	3:14
2.	"Some Song (Alternative Version)"	2:27
3.	"Bottle Up & Explode! (Early Version)"	2:38

CD Single 3

No.	Title	Length
1.	"Baby Britain"	3:14
2.	"Waltz #1 (Demo)"	3:03
3.	"The Enemy Is You"	2:24

7" single

No.	Title	Length
1.	"Baby Britain"	3:10
2.	"Waltz #1 (demo)"	2:58

== Personnel ==
- Elliott Smith – vocals, piano, bass, drums, mandolin, organ
- Rob Schnapf – guitars
- Joanna Bolme – recording
