= Figure 8 (album) =

Studio album by Elliott Smith
- Released: April 18, 2000
- Recorded: 1998–1999
- Studios: Sunset Sound Recorders, Los Angeles, California; Capitol Studios, Los Angeles; Sonora Studios, Los Angeles; Abbey Road Studios, London, England
- Genres: Indie pop; indie rock; power pop; chamber pop
- Length: 52:06
- Label: DreamWorks
- Producers: Elliott Smith; Tom Rothrock; Rob Schnapf

Elliott Smith chronology
XO (1998)	Figure 8 (2000)	From a Basement on the Hill (2004)

Singles from Figure 8
- 1. "Happiness" Released: February 8, 2000; 2. "Son of Sam" Released: April 11, 2000

Figure 8 is the fifth studio album by American singer-songwriter Elliott Smith, and the final album released during his lifetime. It was recorded from 1998 to 2000 at numerous studios and released on April 18, 2000, through DreamWorks Records. Preceded by the singles "Happiness" and "Son of Sam", Figure 8 was Smith's second release on a major label.

== Background ==
Figure 8 was recorded at Sunset Sound in Hollywood, Sonora Studios in Los Angeles, Capitol Studios in Hollywood and Abbey Road Studios in London. Initially titled Place Pigalle after the square in Paris, the title is thought to be taken from a song by Schoolhouse Rock!; Smith covered this song, but it did not make the final track listing. Regarding the album's title, Smith said in a May 11, 2000, article in Boston Herald:

I liked the idea of a self-contained, endless pursuit of perfection. But I have a problem with perfection. I don't think perfection is very artful. But there's something I liked about the image of a skater going in this endless twisted circle that doesn't have any real endpoint. So the object is not to stop or arrive anywhere; it's just to make this thing as beautiful as they can.

Smith described the songs on the album as "more fragmented and dreamlike". The lyrics contain references to serial killer David Berkowitz, the Hindu deity Shiva, actor Bruno Schleinstein, the Hawthorne Bridge in Portland, and the comic book character Sgt. Rock. In interviews Smith asserted that his reference to Berkowitz was intended to be dreamlike or impressionistic. A fan of filmmaker Werner Herzog and Schleinstein, Smith said in an interview with Revolver "How come we have no Bruno S. [in America]? How come he can be a film star in Europe, but over here everybody has to look like they were computer generated?" Smith would again reference Hindu deities at two shows in 2003 when he appeared on stage with the words "Kali - The Destroyer" written on his arm.

=== Cover photo ===
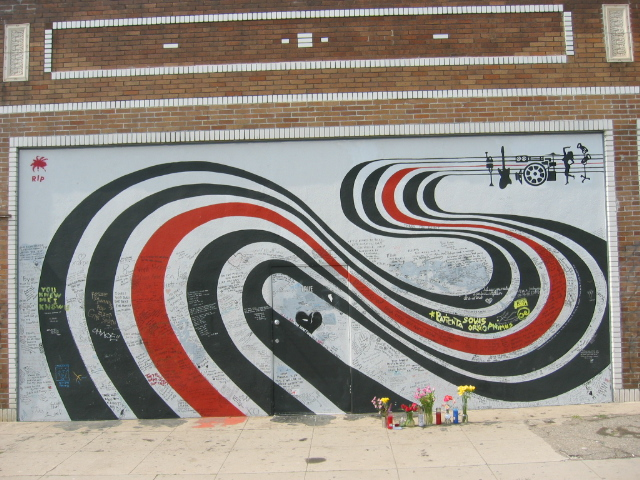
The Figure 8 wall on Sunset Boulevard, Los Angeles, in 2004

The mural wall in Los Angeles that Smith stands in front of in Autumn de Wilde's cover photograph for the album was a local landmark to de Wilde, who grew up in the Sunset Boulevard neighborhood. Since Smith's death, it has become a de facto memorial to him. It is located at 4334 Sunset Boulevard, just east of the intersection of Sunset Boulevard and Fountain Avenue. It has previously been covered with fan-written messages containing lyrics and personal messages to Smith, and once displayed a stenciled image of Smith to mimic his position on the album cover. It is regularly graffiti-ed over, followed by regular restorations undertaken by fans. In 2017, a section of the wall was removed to facilitate the opening of a business inside the building. Despite this, the portion of the mural shown on the album cover is still largely intact.

== Release ==
The album's first single, "Happiness", was released on February 8, 2000. CMJ New Music Report wrote, "While the tune's production recalls the shimmer of XO, it possesses curiously upbeat energy atypical for Smith". This was followed by the album's second and final single, "Son of Sam", on April 11. A music video was released for "Son of Sam", directed by Autumn de Wilde.

Figure 8 was released on April 18, 2000. It debuted at number 99 on the Billboard 200, selling 19,000 copies, and stayed on the chart for 5 weeks. It was Smith's highest-charting album in the US during his lifetime.

The Japanese release of this album included Smith's cover of the Beatles' song "Because" from the film American Beauty and "Figure 8", an abridged cover of a Schoolhouse Rock! song.

The promotional CD for Figure 8 featured cover artwork by Mike Mills, director of Thumbsucker. Smith contributed songs to the Thumbsucker soundtrack.

As of 2004, it has sold 185,000 copies in United States.

The track "L.A." was included on the soundtrack for the 2009 game Guitar Hero 5.

== Critical reception ==
Professional ratings
Aggregate scores
Source	Rating
Metacritic	81/100
Review scores
Source	Rating
AllMusic	3.5/5 stars
Entertainment Weekly	B−
The Guardian	4/5 stars
Los Angeles Times	3.5/4 stars
Melody Maker	4/5 stars
NME	8/10
Pitchfork	6.9/10
Q	4/5 stars
Rolling Stone	3.5/5 stars
Spin	7/10

Figure 8 was met with "universal acclaim" from music critics. At Metacritic, which assigns a normalized rating out of 100 to reviews from mainstream critics, Figure 8 has an average score of 81 based on 19 reviews. NME called it "Smith's best effort to date". Spin wrote, "The record is not a disappointment, it's a progression." The A.V. Club wrote, "Figure 8 is even better [than previous records], a strong collection of lush, densely arranged power-pop [...] and inimitably intimate ballads". Pitchfork described the album musically as "muscular chamber-pop". Tiny Mix Tapes stated the album "dabbled in Spiritualized-style neo-psychedelia".

AllMusic was more critical, writing, "Even if it is a very impressive statement overall, Figure 8 isn't quite the masterpiece it wants to be". Pitchfork, too, opined, "Figure 8, ultimately, isn't as good a record as XO or Either/Or, though the man's not out of the picture yet." Trouser Press called it "a record that feels very different from its predecessors", describing its style as "brisk and busy, up front and confident, upbeat. While nothing here fails the consistent artistry of his work, neither does any of it make the direct connection to a soul and heart."

== Legacy ==
In 2009, Pitchfork placed Figure 8 at number 190 on its list of the 200 greatest albums of the 2000s, noting, "Not quite as intimate as his earliest records and not quite brash and bombastic like its immediate predecessor, Figure 8 marks a subtle refinement of Smith's songwriting skills" and calling it "one of Smith's most accessible and enjoyable records". Rolling Stone placed it at number 42 on their list of the 100 greatest albums of the decade, calling it Smith's "haunted high-water mark". Figure 8 was ranked 86th on The Guardian's 100 Best Albums of the 21st Century list, based on a 2019 poll of music writers. The album was also included in the book 1001 Albums You Must Hear Before You Die. Treble ranked the album at 56th in their "Top 100 Indie Rock albums of the '00s".

== Track listing ==
All tracks are written by Elliott Smith, except where noted.

Figure 8 track listing
No.	Title	Length
1.	"Son of Sam"	3:04
2.	"Somebody That I Used to Know"	2:09
3.	"Junk Bond Trader"	3:49
4.	"Everything Reminds Me of Her"	2:37
5.	"Everything Means Nothing to Me"	2:24
6.	"L.A."	3:14
7.	"In the Lost and Found (Honky Bach)"/"The Roost"	4:32
8.	"Stupidity Tries"	4:23
9.	"Easy Way Out"	2:44
10.	"Wouldn't Mama Be Proud?"	3:25
11.	"Color Bars"	2:19
12.	"Happiness"/"The Gondola Man"	5:04
13.	"Pretty Mary K"	2:36
14.	"I Better Be Quiet Now"	3:35
15.	"Can't Make a Sound"	4:18
16.	"Bye"	1:53
Total length:		52:06

Deluxe edition bonus tracks
No.	Title	Writer(s)	Length
17.	"Figure 8"	Bob Dorough	1:31
18.	"A Living Will"		2:31
19.	"Son of Sam" (acoustic version)		3:05
20.	"I Can't Answer You Anymore"		2:43
21.	"Pretty Mary K" (alternate version)		2:54
22.	"Happiness" (acoustic version)		3:30
23.	"Because"	Lennon–McCartney	2:20
Total length:			70:40

== Personnel ==
- Elliott Smith – vocals (1–15), electric guitar (1, 3, 4, 6, 8–10, 12, 13–15), acoustic guitar (2, 4, 9–15), piano (1, 3, 5, 7, 11–13, 15, 16), bass guitar (1, 3, 6, 10, 12, 15), drums (1, 5, 6, 12, 13), Hammond organ (1, 7, 10, 12, 13), pump organ (7), Chamberlin (5, 8–10, 15), harpsichord (3), orchestra bells (3), shakers (11), marching bass drum (12), guitar loops (7, 12), "rolling bass drums" (15), string arrangement (3, 7, 8, 11, 15), production

Additional personnel

- Sam Coomes – bass guitar ("Everything Means Nothing to Me", "In the Lost and Found (Honky Bach)", "Stupidity Tries", "Pretty Mary K")
- Pete Thomas – drums ("Junk Bond Trader", "Wouldn't Mama Be Proud?", "Can't Make a Sound")
- Joey Waronker – drums ("Stupidity Tries")
- Jon Brion – backing vocals ("Happiness"/"The Gondola Man")
- Suzie Katayama – string conduction and orchestration ("Junk Bond Trader", "In the Lost and Found (Honky Bach)", "Color Bars", "Can't Make a Sound")
- Matt Dunkley – string conduction and orchestration ("Stupidity Tries")

Technical

- Rob Schnapf – production
- Tom Rothrock – production
- Don C. Tyler – mastering
- Paul Hicks – engineering assistance (Abbey Road Studios)
- Charlie Paakkari – engineering assistance (Capitol Studios)
- Dann Thompson – engineering assistance Capitol Studios)
- Jimmy Hoyson – engineering assistance (Capitol Studios)
- Steve Genewick – engineering assistance (Capitol Studios)
- Anthony Arvizu – engineering assistance (Capitol Studios)
- Richard Baron – engineering assistance (Sonora Studios)
- Geoff Walcha – engineering assistance (Sunset Sound Recorders)
- Monique Mizrahi – engineering assistance (Sunset Sound Recorders)
- Autumn DeWilde – sleeve art direction, design and photography
- Dale Smith – sleeve art direction and design

== Charts ==
Chart performance for Figure 8
Chart (2000)	Peak position
Australian Albums (ARIA)	45
French Albums (SNEP)	45
Irish Albums (IRMA)	59
Norwegian Albums (VG-lista)	29
Scottish Albums (Official Charts)	40
Swedish Albums (Sverigetopplistan)	44
UK Albums (Official Charts)	37
US Billboard 200	99

Chart (2024)	Peak position
Greek Albums (IFPI)	61

== Certifications ==
Certifications for Figure 8
Region	Certification	Certified units/sales
United Kingdom (BPI)	Silver	60,000^{‡}
^{‡} Sales+streaming figures based on certification alone.
