= Either/Or (album) =

Studio album by Elliott Smith
- Released: February 25, 1997
- Recorded: 1995–1996
- Studio: Various (see below)
- Genres: Indie folk; indie rock; lo-fi; Americana
- Length: 36:52
- Label: Kill Rock Stars
- Producers: Elliott Smith; Tom Rothrock; Rob Schnapf

Elliott Smith chronology
Elliott Smith (1995)	Either/Or (1997)	XO (1998)

Singles from Either/Or
- 1. "Speed Trials" Released: October 1, 1996; 2. "Ballad of Big Nothing" Released: June 28, 1998

Either/Or is the third studio album by American singer-songwriter Elliott Smith. Either/Or was recorded in several locations, mostly in Portland, Oregon – while Smith was still a member of Heatmiser – and was produced by Smith, Tom Rothrock and Rob Schnapf. Either/Or was recorded sometime between 1995 and 1996 and released on February 25, 1997, on the Kill Rock Stars record label, following Heatmiser's dissolution. Promoted with two singles, "Speed Trials" and "Ballad of Big Nothing", Either/Or did not chart in the US, but was acclaimed by critics.

Director Gus Van Sant was highly impressed with the album, incorporating three of its songs; "Between the Bars", "Angeles" and "Say Yes" along with a new song, "Miss Misery", into the Good Will Hunting soundtrack. In 2020, the album was ranked at 216 on Rolling Stone's 500 Greatest Albums of All Time list.

== Recording ==
Either/Or was recorded at several locations: Joanna Bolme's house; Smith's own house; Undercover, Inc.; Laundry Rules Recording; and the Heatmiser House – all in Portland, Oregon – as well as The Shop in Arcata, California. The album was produced by Smith, Tom Rothrock and Rob Schnapf.

Smith wrote and recorded a song entitled "Either/Or" during the sessions for this album, but it was not included on the final release; however, the song was later included on New Moon, a posthumous compilation of previously unreleased material by Smith.

== Content ==
The album's title derives from the Søren Kierkegaard book of the same name, in which "either/or" refers to the contrast between aesthetic/subjective experience and ethical/objective being. This existential title is reflective of Smith's interest in philosophy, which he studied at Hampshire College in Massachusetts. The lyrics contain many references to Portland such as the neighborhood of Alameda, Division Street and the Portland Rose Festival.

The album's style has been described as "a bridge between the lo-fi darkness of Roman Candle and Elliott Smith and the studio sheen of XO and Figure 8."

== Release ==
The album's first single, "Speed Trials", was released on October 1, 1996.

Either/Or was released on February 25, 1997. It did not chart in the US. The album's second and final single, "Ballad of Big Nothing", was released on June 29, 1998.

Smith would briefly be cast into the international spotlight early the following year when he performed his song, the 1997 standalone single "Miss Misery", at the 1998 Academy Awards ceremony, following the song's appearance in the major motion picture Good Will Hunting and its subsequent Oscar nomination for Best Original Song. Following this appearance, Smith was signed to major label DreamWorks and started work on his fourth studio album, XO.

As of March 2017, Either/Or is Elliott Smith's best selling release (it still has never charted) and has sold 429,000 copies in the United States, according to Nielsen SoundScan.

== Critical reception ==
Professional ratings
Review scores
Source	Rating
AllMusic	4.5/5 stars
Chicago Tribune	3.5/4 stars
The Irish Times	4/5 stars
Mojo	5/5 stars
NME	8/10
Pitchfork	8.8/10 (1997); 10/10 (2017)
The Rolling Stone Album Guide	3.5/5 stars
Select	4/5
Spin	7/10
Uncut	9/10

Either/Or was critically acclaimed. Stephen Thompson of The A.V. Club wrote that the album "marks something of a thematic transition" for Smith, noting "brightness and a pop feel" on Either/Or in contrast to the "stark, guy-with-acoustic-guitar confessionals about drug abuse and darkness" on Elliott Smith. It was voted the 20th best album of 1997 in The Village Voice's annual Pazz & Jop critics poll. The poll's supervisor, Robert Christgau, was less enthusiastic about the album, finding Smith "tuneful if depressive" and believing that, "he could too be popular—he just doesn't want to be, that's all".

In its retrospective review, Tiny Mix Tapes opined: "Simply put, the songs on Either/Or are Elliott Smith's best". Trouser Press called it "even more fully realized" than Elliott Smith.

== Legacy ==
The album inspired Gus Van Sant to invite Smith to contribute to the soundtrack of the film Good Will Hunting. Three Either/Or tracks were incorporated into the soundtrack, as well as a new song, "Miss Misery." Smith was briefly pushed to the forefront of popular culture after performing "Miss Misery" from Good Will Hunting at the 1998 Academy Awards ceremony. Van Sant later also used "Angeles" in his 2007 film Paranoid Park. The song was again featured in the 2020 series Normal People.

Online magazine Pitchfork ranked Either/Or 59th in its list of the 100 greatest albums of the 1990s. Spin ranked Either/Or at number 48 on its list of the best albums from 1987 to 2012. Blender ranked it thirty-sixth in its "100 Greatest Indie Rock Albums Ever" list. In 2013, NME placed Either/Or at number 149 on its list of the 500 Greatest Albums of All Time. Consequence of Sound ranked the album No. 97 on their list of best albums ever. Rolling Stone ranked the album at 216 on the 2020 re-release of their 500 Greatest Albums of All Time list. In 2022, Pitchfork ranked the album #23 on its list of the best albums of the 1990s, and in 2026, it ranked the album #4 on its list of The 100 Best Indie Rock Albums of All Time. The restaurant Either/Or, in Portland, Oregon, references the album's title.

== Track listing ==
All tracks are written by Elliott Smith.

Either/Or track listing
No.	Title	Length
1.	"Speed Trials"	3:01
2.	"Alameda"	3:43
3.	"Ballad of Big Nothing"	2:48
4.	"Between the Bars"	2:21
5.	"Pictures of Me"	3:46
6.	"No Name No. 5"	3:43
7.	"Rose Parade"	3:28
8.	"Punch and Judy"	2:25
9.	"Angeles"	2:56
10.	"Cupid's Trick"	3:04
11.	"2:45 AM"	3:18
12.	"Say Yes"	2:19
Total length:		36:52

Expanded 20th anniversary edition
No.	Title	Length
1.	"Speed Trials" (remastered)	3:01
2.	"Alameda" (remastered)	3:43
3.	"Ballad of Big Nothing" (remastered)	2:48
4.	"Between the Bars" (remastered)	2:21
5.	"Pictures of Me" (remastered)	3:47
6.	"No Name No. 5" (remastered)	3:43
7.	"Rose Parade" (remastered)	3:28
8.	"Punch and Judy" (remastered)	2:26
9.	"Angeles" (remastered)	2:57
10.	"Cupid's Trick" (remastered)	3:05
11.	"2:45 AM" (remastered)	3:19
12.	"Say Yes" (remastered)	2:19
13.	"My New Freedom" (live at the Yo Yo a Go Go Festival in Olympia, WA, 1997 – previously unreleased)	2:49
14.	"Pictures of Me" (live at the Yo Yo a Go Go Festival in Olympia, WA, 1997 – previously unreleased)	3:58
15.	"Angeles" (live at the Yo Yo a Go Go Festival in Olympia, WA, 1997 – previously unreleased)	3:03
16.	"Some Song" (live at the Yo Yo a Go Go Festival in Olympia, WA, 1997 – previously unreleased)	3:15
17.	"Rose Parade" (live at the Yo Yo a Go Go Festival in Olympia, WA, 1997 – previously unreleased)	3:39
18.	"New Monkey" (keyboard version – previously unreleased)	0:42
19.	"I Don't Think I'm Ever Gonna Figure It Out" (remixed/remastered)	1:57
20.	"I Figured You Out" (previously unreleased)	3:45
21.	"Bottle Up and Explode" (alternate version – previously unreleased)	3:27
Total length:		63:53

Alternate Versions from Either/Or EP (2012)
No.	Title	Length
1.	"Angeles" (alternate version)	2:54
2.	"Alameda" (alternate version)	3:42
3.	"Ballad of Big Nothing" (alternate vocal)	2:47
4.	"Punch and Judy" (other version)	3:53
Total length:		12:23

== Personnel ==
- Elliott Smith – all instruments, mixing ("Alameda", "No Name No. 5", "Rose Parade", "2:45 AM")

Technical

- Joanna Bolme – mixing ("Alameda"), back cover photography
- Rob Schnapf – mixing ("Speed Trials", "Ballad of Big Nothing", "Between the Bars", "Pictures of Me", "Punch and Judy", "Angeles", "Cupid's Trick", "Say Yes")
- Tom Rothrock – mixing ("Speed Trials", "Ballad of Big Nothing", "Between the Bars", "Pictures of Me", "Punch and Judy", "Angeles", "Cupid's Trick", "Say Yes")
- Larry Crane – recording ("Pictures of Me")
- Don C. Tyler – mastering
- Neil Gust – sleeve layout
- Debbie Pastor – front cover photography

== Certifications ==
Certifications for Either/Or
Region	Certification	Certified units/sales
United Kingdom (BPI)	Gold	100,000^{‡}
^{‡} Sales+streaming figures based on certification alone.
