= Steve Hanft =

American film director

Steve Hanft (born May 1966) is an American music video and film director.

== Early life ==
Steven Hanft was born in Ventura, California. He has an MFA in Experimental Narrative Film from CalArts.

== Career ==
Steve Hanft has directed music videos for recording artists such as The Cure "Gone!", Delinquent Habits "Tres Delinquentes" & "Return of the Tres", Primal Scream "Kowalski" (written by Irvine Welsh and featuring Kate Moss and Devon Aoki), Spoon "The Way We Get By", and for Beck, including "Pay No Mind - Snoozer" (featuring Mark Gonzales), "Where it's At" (shot by Lance Acord), "Jack-ass" (featuring Willie Nelson), and "The Golden Age."

The video Steve Hanft directed for Beck, "Loser", received three nominations at the MTV Music Video Awards in 1994 including "Best Male Video", "Best New Artist In A Video", and "Best Alternative Video."

In 1996, the video Steve Hanft directed for "Where it's At" won the MTV Music Video Award for "Best Male Video" and was chosen to be the first video aired on MTV2. In 1998, Steve Hanft directed an experimental documentary featuring Academy Award nominated composer Elliott Smith promoting the album "XO" called Strange Parallel which debuted at the CMJ Film Fest.

From 2004 to 2008 Steve Hanft documented the resurgence of Jamaican sound system music in Los Angeles, resulting in the 2008 documentary, Return of the Rub-A-Dub Style. The documentary features performances and interviews with U-Roy, Sister Nancy, Scientist, and Ranking Joe. Sunglass Catch a 2007 video Steve Hanft produced and co-starred in, has been named one of "The 10 Most Important Youtube Videos" according to Business Insider and won a Cannes Bronze Lion.

"Where it's At" was referred to in the title the 2009 LA Film Fest event "Where it Was At: A Propaganda & Satellite Films Tribute," a panel featuring Steve Golin, Nigel Dick, Danielle Peretz, and Steve Hanft, moderated by Laurie Malaga.

In 2018, Steve Hanft wrote the action suspense screenplay Crocodile Rock commissioned by Chris Murphy. In February 2024, Hanft directed and created the film clip for Darren Cross, A Harebrained Adventure Of An Amateur Shaman.
