= XO (Elliott Smith album) =

Studio album by Elliott Smith
- Released: August 25, 1998
- Recorded: 1997–1998
- Studios: Sunset Sound, Los Angeles; Sound Factory, Los Angeles; Ocean Way, Hollywood; Sonora, Los Angeles; Jackpot!, Portland
- Genres: Alternative rock; art pop; baroque pop; chamber pop; orchestral pop; indie folk; indie rock
- Length: 44:39
- Label: DreamWorks
- Producers: Elliott Smith; Rob Schnapf; Tom Rothrock

Elliott Smith chronology
Either/Or (1997)	XO (1998)	Figure 8 (2000)

Singles from XO
- 1. "Waltz #2 (XO)" Released: September 21, 1998; 2. "Baby Britain" Released: April 19, 1999

XO is the fourth studio album and major label debut by American singer-songwriter Elliott Smith, released on August 25, 1998, by DreamWorks Records.

== Recording ==
Early sessions for the album began at Larry Crane's Jackpot Recording Studio after the release of Either/Or in 1997. These sessions would yield early demos of several album tracks, as well as outtakes later released posthumously on New Moon. Work began in earnest on the album in early 1998, after Smith traveled to Los Angeles to work with producers Rob Schnapf and Tom Rothrock. An early working title for the album was Grand Mal.

The title of the first track, "Sweet Adeline", was inspired by Smith's recollections of his grandmother singing in her glee club, Sweet Adelines International. "Amity" is believed to be named after a friend who can be seen in photographs from Smith's 1997 tour.

== Release ==
XO was released by DreamWorks Records on August 25, 1998. It was Smith's first solo record on a major record label, though he had previously released music on a major label with his band Heatmiser's final album, Mic City Sons (1996).

Singles released from the album were "Waltz #2 (XO)" in the same year and "Baby Britain" the following year.

== Reception ==
Professional ratings
Review scores
Source	Rating
AllMusic	4.5/5 stars
The Baltimore Sun	3.5/4 stars
Entertainment Weekly	B
Houston Chronicle	4/5 stars
Los Angeles Times	4/4 stars
NME	7/10
Pitchfork	8.1/10 (1998); 9.5/10 (2023)
Rolling Stone	3/5 stars
Select	4/5
Spin	8/10

XO was well received by critics upon its release. Mark Richardson of Pitchfork wrote, "Smith's songwriting continues to improve, as each of [the album's] fourteen tracks displays his inarguable mastery of the pop song structure more clearly than ever." Robert Christgau of The Village Voice gave the album a one-star honorable mention rating, indicating "a worthy effort consumers attuned to its overriding aesthetic or individual vision may well like". His review described the album's music as "high tune, low affect," citing "Waltz #2 (XO)" and "Everybody Cares, Everybody Understands" as highlights. XO placed at number five on The Village Voice's 1998 end-of-year Pazz & Jop poll.

In its retrospective review, BBC Music wrote, "the budget might have gone up, but Smith's masterful way with an understated melody and melancholic lyric remained firmly intact", calling XO "perhaps the greatest long-player Smith released; if not, it's certainly the equal of the preceding Either/Or. Repeat listens don't dull it in the slightest, every barbed one-liner and exhalation of despair perfectly preserved". Trouser Press called the record "a tastefully commercialized production (completely with horns and strings) that respects Smith's privacy and, in fact, does him a solid service. [...] If the songs are not the most profound or developed of Smith's catalogue, it's still a great record that proves how durable integrity can be."

A 2023 review by Pitchfork's Jayson Greene described the album as "a transformational landmark and a logical next step for the restless composer" and remarked that the "breadth and depth of XO astonished even his benefactors".

== Legacy ==
In 2010, Spin magazine placed XO at number 90 on its list of the 125 best albums in the magazine's lifetime. Pitchfork placed the album at number 68 in their list of the greatest albums of the 1990s.

Matthew LeMay has written a book about XO as part of the 33⅓ series of books on albums, released on April 6, 2009, by the Continuum International Publishing Group.

RJD2 sampled "I Didn't Understand" on the song "Ghostwriter" on his album Deadringer. Indie rock band Grandaddy performed "Oh Well, Okay" live in 2012 as a tribute to Smith.

== Track listing ==
All tracks are written by Elliott Smith.

XO track listing
No.	Title	Length
1.	"Sweet Adeline"	3:15
2.	"Tomorrow Tomorrow"	3:07
3.	"Waltz #2 (XO)"	4:40
4.	"Baby Britain"	3:13
5.	"Pitseleh"	3:22
6.	"Independence Day"	3:04
7.	"Bled White"	3:22
8.	"Waltz #1"	3:22
9.	"Amity"	2:20
10.	"Oh Well, Okay"	2:33
11.	"Bottle Up and Explode!"	2:58
12.	"A Question Mark"	2:41
13.	"Everybody Cares, Everybody Understands"	4:25
14.	"I Didn't Understand"	2:17
Total length:		44:39

Japanese CD edition bonus track
No.	Title	Length
15.	"Miss Misery"	3:09
Total length:		47:48

French CD edition bonus tracks
No.	Title	Length
1.	"Our Thing"	3:00
2.	"How to Take a Fall"	2:52
3.	"Some Song"	2:09
Total length:		52:40

Deluxe edition bonus tracks
No.	Title	Length
15.	"Our Thing"	2:59
16.	"How to Take a Fall"	2:52
17.	"The Enemy Is You"	2:23
18.	"Some Song" (alternative version)	2:26
19.	"Waltz #1" (demo version)	3:02
20.	"Bottle Up & Explode!" (early version)	2:38
21.	"Baby Britain" (remix)	3:13
22.	"Waltz #2" (radio edit)	3:58
23.	"Miss Misery"	3:12
Total length:		71:22

== Personnel ==
- Elliott Smith – guitar, vocals, piano, bass guitar, drums, organ, mandolin, electric piano, melodica, percussion, string and horn arrangements, record producer, recording (all tracks except 4 and 9)

Additional personnel

- Rob Schnapf – guitar ("Baby Britain"), production, recording (all tracks except 4 and 9)
- Paul Pulvirenti – drums on "Baby Britain"
- Tom Rothrock – drum programming ("Independence Day"), production, recording (all tracks except 4 and 9)
- Joey Waronker – drums ("Bled White", "Bottle Up and Explode!")
- Jon Brion – vibraphone and Chamberlin ("Waltz #1", "Bottle Up and Explode!", "Everybody Cares, Everybody Understands")
- R. James Atkinson – French horn on "Oh Well, Okay"
- Bruce Eskovitz – bass saxophone, baritone saxophone on "A Question Mark", flute on "Everybody Cares, Everybody Understands"
- Roy Poper – trumpet on "Everybody Cares, Everybody Understands"
- Shelly Berg – string and horn arrangements
- Tom Halm – string and horn arrangements
- Farhad Behroozi – strings
- Henry Ferber – strings
- Jerrod Goodman – strings
- Pamela DeAlmeida – strings
- Peter Hatch – strings
- Raymond Tischer II – strings
- Russel Cantor – strings
- Waldemar DeAlmeida – strings

Technical

- Alex Sanderson – engineering assistance
- Doug Boehm – engineering assistance
- Richard Barron – engineering assistance
- Stephen Marcussen – mastering
- Larry Crane – recording (tracks 4 and 9)
- Johnson and Wolverton – sleeve artwork
- Eric Matthies – sleeve photography

== Charts ==
=== Album ===
Chart performance for XO
Chart (1998–1999)	Peak position
Australian Albums (ARIA)	46
Swedish Albums (Sverigetopplistan)	41
US Billboard 200	104

Chart (2026)	Peak position
Greek Albums (IFPI)	73

=== Singles ===
Chart performance for singles from XO
Title	Year	Peak positions
Title	Year	UK
"Waltz #2 (XO)"	1998	52
"Baby Britain"	1999	55

== Certifications and sales ==
Certifications and sales for XO
Region	Certification	Certified units/sales
United Kingdom (BPI)	Silver	60,000^{‡}
United States	—	400,000
^{‡} Sales+streaming figures based on certification alone.
