= Dinosaur Jr. discography =

Music released by American alternative rock band

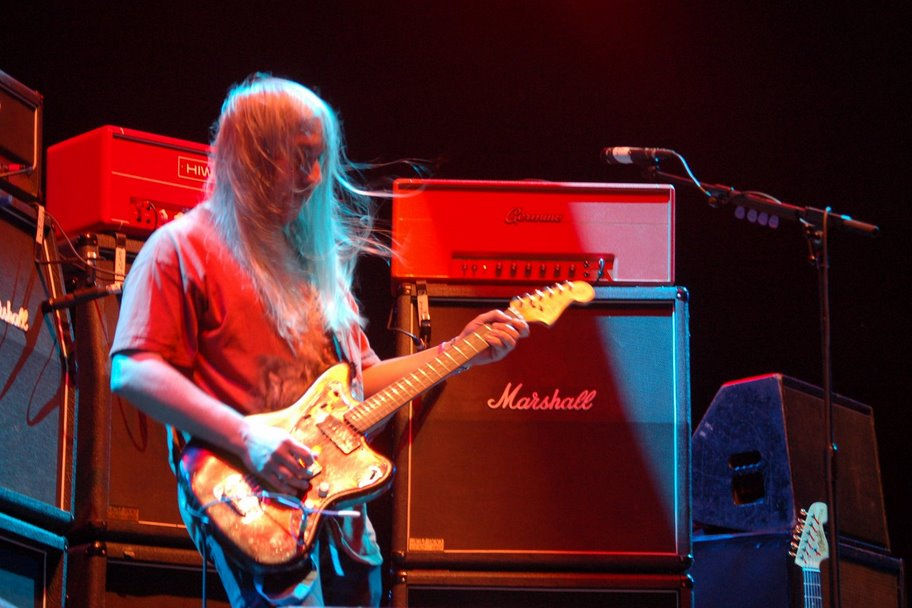
- Dinosaur Jr. in concert
- Studio albums: 13
- Extended plays: 15
- Live albums: 8
- Compilation albums: 7
- Singles: 14
- Video albums: 2
- Music videos: 28

The discography of Dinosaur Jr., an Amherst, Massachusetts-based alternative rock band, consists of 13 studio albums, two live albums, 15 extended plays (EP), seven compilations, and several singles. The band's first album Dinosaur was released under Homestead Records, and the majority of the band's albums were released under Blanco y Negro Records.

== Albums ==
=== Studio albums ===
Title	Album details	Peak chart positions								
Title	Album details	US	AUS	BEL	GER	JPN	NL	NZ	SWE	UK
Dinosaur	Released: 1985; Label: Homestead / Merge (reissue); Format:	–	–	–	–	–	–	–	–	–
You're Living All Over Me	Released: 1987; Label: SST / Merge (reissue); Format:	–	–	–	–	–	–	–	–	–
Bug	Released: 1988; Label: SST / Merge (reissue); Format:	–	–	–	–	–	–	–	–	–
Green Mind	Released: 1991; Label: Blanco y Negro / Sire / Rhino (reissue); Format:	168	108	–	–	–	–	24	–	36
Where You Been	Released: 1993; Label: Blanco y Negro / Sire / Rhino (reissue); Format:	50	45	–	69	–	82	29	24	10
Without a Sound	Released: 1994; Label: Blanco y Negro / Sire; Format:	44	13	–	–	–	91	17	7	24
Hand It Over	Released: 1997; Label: Blanco y Negro / Sire; Format:	188	–	–	–	–	–	–	30	82
Beyond	Released: 2007; Label: Fat Possum Records; Format:	69	94	34	49	42	–	–	30	52
Farm	Released: 2009; Label: Jagjaguwar; Format:	29	95	53	77	72	–	–	40	80
I Bet on Sky	Released: 2012; Label: Jagjaguwar; Format:	51	97	61	39	91	–	–	24	73
Give a Glimpse of What Yer Not	Released: August 5, 2016; Label: Jagjaguwar; Format: CD, vinyl, download	72	38	29	18	57	49	–	56	23
Sweep It Into Space	Released: April 23, 2021; Label: Jagjaguwar; Format: CD, vinyl, download	115	61	21	9	85	82	40	–	29
There Near	Released: August 28, 2026; Label: Jagjaguwar; Format: CD, vinyl, download	–	–	178	–	–	– (Note: There Near did not enter the Dutch Album Top 100, but peaked at number 25 on the Dutch Vinyl 33 chart.)	–	– (Note: There Near did not enter the Swedish Top Albums chart, but peaked at number five on the Swedish Physical Albums chart.)	– (Note: There Near did not enter the UK Albums Chart, but peaked at number 19 on the UK Albums Sales Chart.)

=== Live albums ===
Title	Album details	Peak chart positions
Title	Album details	US
Bug: Live at the 9:30 Club, Washington, DC, June 2011	Released: 2012; Label: Outer Battery Records; Format:	–
Chocomel Daze	Released: 2012; Label: Merge Records; Format:	
Swedish Fist (Live In Stockholm)	Released: 2020; Label: Cherry Red Records; Format:	–
Emptiness at the Sinclair	Released: 2021; Label: Jagjaguwar; Format:	
Seventytwohundredseconds - MTV Live	Released: 2022; Label: Cherry Red Records; Format:	
The Black Session	Released: 2024; Label: Cherry Red Records; Format:	
Guess I'll Crawl (Live In Santa Monica)	Released: 2025; Label: Cherry Red Records; Format:	–
Live in Hollywood 1991	Released: 2026; Label: Cherry Red Records; Format:	–

=== Compilation albums ===
Title	Album details	Peak chart positions
Title	Album details	JPN
Fossils	Released: 1991; Label: SST; Format:	–
Whatever's Cool with Me	Released: 1991; Label: Sire; Format:	–
BBC: In Session	Released: 1999; Label: Strange Fruit; Format:	–
Ear-Bleeding Country: The Best of Dinosaur Jr	Released: 2001; Label: Rhino; Format:	–
Zombie Worm	Released: February 22, 2006; Label: Imperial; Format:	148

== Box set ==
- 2011 – Cassette Trilogy
- 2014 – Visitors
- 2023 – Puke + Cry – The Sire Years 1990-1997

== EPs and singles ==
Year	Title	Tracks	Label
1985	Repulsion	A: "Repulsion"; B: "Bulbs of Passion"	Homestead Records (1985)
1987	Little Fury Things	A: "Little Fury Things" (3:07); B: "In a Jar" (3:28); "Show Me the Way" (3:49)	SST
1988	Freak Scene	A: "Freak Scene" (3:35); B: "Keep the Glove" (2:51)	SST
1989	Just Like Heaven	A1: "Just Like Heaven" (2:54); B1: "Throw Down" (0:47); B2: "Chunks" (2:10)	SST
1991	The Wagon (7")	A: "The Wagon"; B: "Better Than Gone"	Glitterhouse / Sub Pop
1991	The Wagon (12")	"The Wagon" (4:57); "Pebbles + Weeds" (5:23); "The Little Baby" (4:31); "Quicksand" (Wagon reprise) (4:29)	Blanco y Negro / Sire
1991	Whatever's Cool with Me	"Whatever's Cool With Me" (4:34); "Sideways" (4:11); "Thumb" (live) (7:42); "Keep the Glove" (live) (3:16)	Blanco y Negro / Sire
1992	Get Me (12")	Side A: "Get Me"; Side B: "Hot Burrito #2", "Quest" (live)	Blanco y Negro (UK)
1993	Start Choppin'	"Start Choppin" (5:39); "Turnip Farm" (5:49); "Forget It" (4:04)	Blanco y Negro / Sire
1993	Out There (CD1)	"Out There" (5:55); "Quest" (live) (5:48); "Kracked" (live) (3:29); "Keeblin'" (3:41)	Blanco y Negro / Sire
1993	Out There (CD2)	"Out There" (5:57); "Get Me" (Peel session) (4:18); "Severed Lips" (Goodier session) (2:56); "Thumb" (Goodier session) (3:03)	Blanco y Negro / Sire
1994	Feel the Pain	"Feel the Pain" (4:18); "Get Out of This" (no words just solo) (5:30); "Repulsion" (acoustic live at CBGB's) (2:41)	Blanco y Negro / Sire
1995	I Don't Think So	"I Don't Think So" (3:30); "What Else Is New" (live) (10:13); "Sludge" (live) (8:22)	Blanco y Negro / Sire
1997	Take a Run at the Sun	"Take a Run at the Sun" (3:33); "Don't You Think It's Time" (2:29); "The Pickle Song" (1:45)	Blanco y Negro / Sire
1997	I'm Insane	A: "I'm Insane"; B: "I Misunderstood"	Trade 2 / Island
2007	Been There All the Time	A: "Been There All the Time"; B: "Back to Your Heart"	Fat Possum Records
2009	Pieces	A: "Pieces" (4:27); B: "Houses" (3:35)	Jagjaguwar
2009	Over It	A: "Over It"; B: "Tarpit" (Live)	Play It Again Sam
2009	I Don't Wanna Go There	A: "I Don't Wanna Go There (live)"; B: "Tarpit (live)"	Jagjaguwar
2012	Watch the Corners	A: "Watch the Corners"; B: "Now the Fall"	Jagjaguwar
2012	Now the Fall	A: "Now the Fall"; B: "Ricochet"	Jagjaguwar
2016	Two Things	A: "Two Things"; B: "Center of the Universe"	Jagjaguwar
2018	Hold Unknown	"Hold Unknown"	Jagjaguwar
2024	Whenever You're Ready	"Whenever You're Ready"	Jagjaguwar

=== As lead artist ===
List of singles, with selected chart positions and certifications, showing year released and album name
Year	Title	Peak chart positions										Album
Year	Title	US	US Alt.	AUS	CAN	IRL	JPN	MEX	SCO	SWE	UK	Album
1988	"Freak Scene"	—	—	—	—	—	—	—	—	—	—	Bug
1989	"Just Like Heaven"	—	—	—	—	—	—	—	—	—	78	Fossils
1991	"The Wagon"	—	22	—	—	—	—	—	—	—	49	Green Mind
1992	"Get Me"	—	—	106	—	—	—	—	—	39	44	Where You Been
1993	"Start Choppin'"	—	3	137	—	20	—	—	—	40	20	Where You Been
1993	"Out There"	—	—	—	—	—	—	—	—	—	44	Where You Been
1994	"Feel the Pain"	62	4	61	54	—	—	—	21	—	25	Without a Sound
1994	"Over Your Shoulder"	—	—	—	—	—	18	—	—	—	—	Without a Sound
1995	"I Don't Think So"	—	—	101	—	—	—	—	61	—	67	Without a Sound
1997	"Take a Run at the Sun"	—	—	126	—	—	—	—	48	—	53	Hand It Over (UK and Australian versions only)
2005	"Freak Scene" / "Bulbs Of Passion"	—	—	—	—	—	—	—	—	—	108	non-album single
2007	"Almost Ready"	—	—	—	—	—	—	—	—	—	—	Beyond
2007	"Been There All the Time" UK 7"	—	—	—	—	—	—	—	—	—	—	Beyond
2007	"Crumble" UK 7"	—	—	—	—	—	—	—	—	—	—	Beyond
2009	"Over It"UK 7"	—	—	—	—	—	—	—	—	—	—	Farm
2009	"Pieces"7"	—	—	—	—	—	—	—	—	—	—	Farm
2016	"Tiny"	—	—	—	—	—	—	42	—	—	—	Give a Glimpse of What Yer Not
2021	"I Ran Away"	—	—	—	—	—	—	—	—	—	—	Sweep It Into Space
2021	"Garden"	—	—	—	—	—	—	—	—	—	—	Sweep It Into Space
2021	"Take It Back"	—	—	—	—	—	—	—	—	—	—	Sweep It Into Space
2026	"Several Got Away"	—	—	—	—	—	—	—	—	—	—	There Near
2026	"Everything At Once"	—	—	—	—	—	—	—	—	—	—	There Near

== Other appearances ==
Year	Track(s)	Title	Label
1989	"Lotta Love"	The Bridge: A Tribute to Neil Young	Caroline
1989	"I'll Feel a Whole Lot Better"	Time Between – A Tribute to The Byrds	Imaginary
1993	"Missing Link" (with Del Tha Funky Homosapien)	Judgment Night (Music From the Motion Picture)	Largo Entertainment
1993	"Out There"	Music from the Motion Picture Wayne's World 2	Reprise
1994	"Turnip Farm"	Reality Bites: Original Motion Picture Soundtrack	RCA
1994	"Goin' Blind"	Kiss My Ass: Classic Kiss Regrooved	Mercury
1994	"I Misunderstood"	Beat the Retreat (Songs by Richard Thompson)	EMI
1994	"Blah"	Melrose Place: The Music	Giant
1994	"Get Me"	Triple J Hottest 100, Volume 1	ABC Music
1995	"Feel the Pain"	Triple J Hottest 100, Volume 2	ABC Music
1995	"Not You Again"	This Is Fort Apache	Fort Apache/MCA Records
2003	"Feel the Pain"	The Work of Director Spike Jonze	Labels
2009	"The Backyard"	Ciao My Shining Star: The Songs of Mark Mulcahy	Shout! Factory
2009	"Just Like Heaven"	Pictures of You; A Tribute to Godlike Geniuses The Cure	NME Cover Mount
2012	"Start Choppin'"	Chasing Mavericks	Sony Classical

== Music videos ==
- "Little Fury Things" (1987)
- "Freak Scene" (1988)
- "No Bones" (1988)
- "Just Like Heaven" (1989)
- "The Wagon" (1990)
- "Whatever's Cool with Me" (U.S. Ver.)( 1991)
- "Whatever's Cool with Me" (U.K. Ver.) (1991)
- "Thumb" (1991)
- "Get Me" (1992)
- "Start Choppin'" (1993)
- "Out There" (1993)
- "Goin' Home" (1993)
- "Feel the Pain" (1994)
- "I Don't Think So" (1995)
- "Take a Run at the Sun" (1997)
- "I'm Insane" (1997)
- "Almost Ready" (2007)
- "Been There All the Time" (2007)
- "Over It" (2009)
- "Watch the Corners" (2012)
- "Pierce the Morning Rain" (2013)
- "Tiny" (2016)
- "Goin Down" (2016)
- "Knocked Around" (2017)
- "I Ran Away" (2021)
- "Garden" (2021)
- "Take It Back" (2021)
- "Several Got Away" (2026)
- "Everything At Once" (2026)
