= Ear-Bleeding Country: The Best of Dinosaur Jr =

Greatest hits album by Dinosaur Jr.
- Released: October 2, 2001
- Genre: Alternative rock
- Length: 75:18
- Label: Rhino
- Producer: Dinosaur Jr.

Dinosaur Jr. chronology
Hand It Over (1997)	Ear-Bleeding Country: The Best of Dinosaur Jr (2001)	Beyond (2007)

Ear-Bleeding Country: The Best of Dinosaur Jr is the first greatest hits compilation album by American alternative rock band Dinosaur Jr..

== Reception ==
Professional ratings
Review scores
Source	Rating
Allmusic	4.5/5 stars

In his Allmusic review, music critic Stephen Thomas Erlewine wrote "this generous 19-track collection never sags in its momentum, never has a dull spot, and pulls off a tricky move -- it makes Mascis seem consistent, which latter-day Dinosaur Jr. were not necessarily."

== Track listing ==
All songs performed by Dinosaur Jr. unless otherwise noted

No.	Title	Original release	Length
1.	"Repulsion"	Dinosaur (1985)	3:03
2.	"Little Fury Things"	You're Living All Over Me (1987)	3:06
3.	"In a Jar"	You're Living All Over Me	3:28
4.	"Freak Scene "	Bug (1988)	3:37
5.	"Budge"	Bug	2:32
6.	"Just Like Heaven" (The Cure cover)	"Just Like Heaven" single (1989)	2:54
7.	"The Wagon"	Green Mind (1991)	4:55
8.	"Thumb"	Green Mind	5:36
9.	"Whatever's Cool With Me"	Whatever's Cool with Me (1991)	4:32
10.	"Not You Again"	Whatever's Cool with Me	2:28
11.	"Out There"	Where You Been (1993)	5:53
12.	"Start Choppin"	Where You Been	5:37
13.	"Get Me"	Where You Been	5:50
14.	"Feel the Pain"	Without a Sound (1994)	4:18
15.	"I Don't Think So"	Without a Sound	3:36
16.	"Take a Run at the Sun" (performed by J Mascis)	Grace of My Heart soundtrack (1996)	3:29
17.	"Nothin's Goin' On"	Hand It Over (1997)	3:13
18.	"I'm Insane"	Hand it Over	3:52
19.	"Where'd You Go" (performed by J Mascis + The Fog)	More Light (2000)	3:20

== Personnel ==
=== Dinosaur Jr. ===
- J Mascis - Vocals, Guitar, Drums (tracks 7-10, 14-19), Bass (tracks 7-10)
- Lou Barlow - Bass (Tracks 1-6), Vocals (tracks 1-3)
- Murph - Drums (tracks 1-13)
- Don Fleming - Guitar (tracks 7-8)
- Jay Spiegel - Percussion (tracks 7-8)
- Mike Johnson - Bass (tracks 9-15, 17-18)

=== Guest musicians ===
- Kevin Shields - Guitar on track 19
