= The Wagon =

Single by Dinosaur Jr.

from the album Green Mind
- B-side: "Better Than Gone" (US); "The Little Baby" (UK)
- Released: January 21, 1991
- Genre: Alternative rock; indie rock; grunge
- Length: 4:54
- Label: Sub Pop (US); Blanco Y Negro (UK)
- Songwriter(s): J Mascis

Dinosaur Jr. singles chronology
"Just Like Heaven" (1989)	"The Wagon" (1991)	"Whatever's Cool With Me" (1991)

"The Wagon" is a song by alternative rock band Dinosaur Jr., released on their 1991 album Green Mind. Featuring lyrics inspired by the band's use of station wagons for transportation in its early days, the song was written by J Mascis and was one of the three songs on Green Mind to include drummer Murph.

The song was released as a single, reaching number 49 in the UK and number 22 on the US Modern Rock charts. It has since seen critical acclaim for its composition, production, and instrumental performance.

== Background ==
J Mascis stated in an interview that "The Wagon" was partly inspired by the station wagons that he and Lou Barlow used to get around in the early days of the band. He explained:

I don't know, we always had a [station] wagon. Me and Lou, our parents both had a wagon, and that's how we’d get around, in our parents' cars. On our first tour, we did it in a station wagon. I guess that was all we knew of cars. It was a good car 'cause it held a lot of stuff. It was kind of a part of the band when we started. I wish cars still had the wood paneling.

"The Wagon" was the group's first recording without original bassist Lou Barlow. The song was also one of the three on Green Mind which features drummer Murph, with Mascis and Jay Spiegel drumming on the other songs on the album. Don Fleming of Gumball appears on guitar.

== Release and reception ==
"The Wagon" was released as the sole single from Green Mind in 1991. The B-side, "Better Than Gone," was written and sung by Don Fleming. The song was a moderate chart success, reaching number 49 in the UK and number 22 on the US Modern Rock charts.

Melody Maker named "The Wagon" one of its two singles of the week, with writer Everett True describing the song as "Sheer exhilaration!" Tom Maginnis of AllMusic praised the song's wall-of-sound production and Murph's drum work, concluding that the song "sets the bar so high as an album opener that it's hard for what follows to match such intensity." Pitchfork said the song "snarls with nearly as much pop hookcraft and gnarly guitar spizz as Bug's opener 'Freak Scene'" Greg Kot of Chicago Tribune described the song as "pulverizing," while Michael Nelson of Stereogum called the track an "ebullient and wonderful rocker."

== Track listing ==
Vinyl, 7", (Sub Pop) SP68A

1. "The Wagon" – 4:40
2. "Better Than Gone" – 3:35

Vinyl, 7", (Blanco Y Negro)

1. "The Wagon" – 4:57
2. "The Little Baby" – 2:11

Vinyl, 12" (Blanco Y Negro, WEA)

1. "The Wagon" – 4:57
2. "The Little Baby" – 2:11
3. "Pebbles + Weeds" – 5:25
4. "Quicksand (Wagon Reprise)" – 4:34 (written by David Bowie)
