= Goodnight Unknown =

Studio album by Lou Barlow
- Released: October 6, 2009
- Studio: Ear Knife by Barlow and the Hobby Shop
- Genre: Folk rock, lo-fi, alternative rock
- Label: Merge, Domino
- Producer: Lou Barlow and Andrew Murdock

Lou Barlow chronology
Emoh (2005)	Goodnight Unknown (2009)	Brace the Wave (2015)

Professional ratings
Aggregate scores
Source	Rating
Metacritic	68/100 link
Review scores
Source	Rating
AllMusic	link
The A.V. Club	(B−)
CHARTattack	4/5 stars
Drowned in Sound	(8/10)
NME	(favorable)
Pitchfork Media	(7.3/10)
Prefix Mag	(6.5/10)
Tiny Mix Tapes	3.5/5 stars

Goodnight Unknown is a solo studio album by Lou Barlow, the second with his real name; it was released in 2009 by Merge Records in the USA and by Domino Recording Company in the UK.

== Track listing ==
1. "Sharing"
2. "Goodnight Unknown"
3. "Too Much Freedom"
4. "Faith In Your Heartbeat"
5. "The One I Call"
6. "The Right"
7. "Gravitate"
8. "I'm Thinking ..."
9. "One Machine, One Long Fight"
10. "Praise"
11. "Take Advantage"
12. "Modesty"
13. "Don't Apologize"
14. "One Note Tone"

== Personnel ==
- Lou Barlow – everything but the following
- Imaad Wasif – guitar on tracks 2,3,5,6,10,11,13 (mantis mural at Ear Knife)
- Dale Crover – drums on tracks 1,2,6,7,9,13
- Adam Harding – vocals on track 11, percussion on track 5 (video stills in CD booklet)
- Sebastian Steinberg – bass on tracks 7,11
- Lisa Germano – vocals on track 3
- Murph additional drums on track 7
