= Whatever's Cool with Me =

EP by Dinosaur Jr
- Released: October 22, 1991
- Genre: Alternative rock
- Label: Sire
- Producer: J Mascis

Dinosaur Jr chronology
Fossils (1991)	Whatever's Cool with Me (1991)	Where You Been (1993)

Whatever's Cool with Me is an EP by the American band Dinosaur Jr. It was released on Sire Records in 1991. It contains the "Whatever's Cool With Me" single and the European single of "The Wagon". The band supported the EP by touring with My Bloody Valentine. "Quicksand" is a cover of the David Bowie song.

A music video for the song "Whatever's Cool with Me" was shot at J Mascis's home in Amherst, Massachusetts, and was directed by Jim Spring and Jens Jurgensen. The EP sold more than 40,000 copies in its first six months of release.

Whatever's Cool with Me is the first Dinosaur Jr. recording to feature bassist Mike Johnson. The band's prior main release was the Green Mind album (their debut on a major label). Due to their increased exposure, a sticker was appended to various editions of Whatever's Cool with Me in order to clarify that it was not a proper album. The text stated "This is not an album. One new single and 7 b-sides. Never before released in the USA."

== Critical reception ==
Professional ratings
Review scores
Source	Rating
AllMusic	4/5 stars
Christgau's Consumer Guide	(neither)
The Encyclopedia of Popular Music	2/5 stars
Spin Alternative Record Guide	5/10

The St. Petersburg Times deemed the release "an eight-song EP full of cacophonous noise and hectic delight." The Hartford Courant called it "a searing EP." The Seattle Times wrote that the EP showcases "the Dinosaur at its most irresistibly rapacious, the irreverent noisemakers The Replacements would have been if they hadn't turned into The Knack." Trouser Press opined that "only the brisk and tight 'Not You Again', in which Mascis marvels woefully at 'the mess I made again…how do I do it?,' displays the kind of small effort it takes to elevate slack rubbish into slacker art."

== Track listing ==
CD Maxi-Single (Sire Records Company)

1. "Whatever's Cool with Me" - 4:34
2. "Sideways" - 4:14
3. "Not You Again" - 2:32
4. "The Little Baby" - 2:11
5. "Pebbles + Weeds" - 5:25
6. "Quicksand" (David Bowie, additional lyrics by J Mascis, contains the main guitar riff from "Andy Warhol") - 4:34
7. "Thumb (live)" - 7:45
8. "Keep the Glove (live)" - 3:16

12" Vinyl (Warner Music UK Ltd.)

Side A

1. "Whatever's Cool with Me" - 4:34
2. "Sideways" - 4:14

Side B

1. "Thumb (live)" - 7:45
2. "Keep the Glove (live)" - 3:16

CD, Maxi-Single (Blanco Y Negro, Warner Music UK Ltd.)

1. "Whatever's Cool with Me" - 4:34
2. "Sideways" - 4:14
3. "Thumb (live)" - 7:45
4. "Keep the Glove (live)" - 3:16

7" Vinyl (Blanco Y Negro)

1. "Whatever's Cool with Me" - 4:34
2. "Sideways" - 4:14

"The Little Baby", "Pebbles + Weeds", and "Quicksand" are the B-sides from "The Wagon" single released in 1991.

== Personnel ==
- J Mascis – vocals, guitar, bass guitar, drums, vibraphone
- Mike Johnson – bass guitar
- Murph – drums
