= Fossils (album) =

Compilation album by Dinosaur Jr.
- Released: August 1991
- Genre: Indie rock
- Length: 22:24
- Label: SST

Dinosaur Jr. chronology
Green Mind (1991)	Fossils (1991)	Where You Been (1993)

Professional ratings
Review scores
Source	Rating
AllMusic	4/5 stars
Christgau's Consumer Guide	(3-star Honorable Mention)
The Encyclopedia of Popular Music	3/5 stars
Spin Alternative Record Guide	9/10

Fossils is a compilation album by indie rock band Dinosaur Jr., released in August 1991 on SST Records. It contains three 7" singles the band had previously released on SST, including a version of the song 'Keep the Glove' which is different from the version on the reissue of Bug, as well as three covers. A deluxe 5"x7" edition, along with an accompanying book box set, was released on Record Store Day 2014.

== Track listing ==
All tracks are written by J. Mascis except where noted.

No.	Title	Writer(s)	Length
1.	"Little Fury Things"		3:05
2.	"In a Jar"		3:26
3.	"Show Me the Way"	Peter Frampton	3:45
4.	"Freak Scene"		3:35
5.	"Keep the Glove"		2:47
6.	"Just Like Heaven"	Simon Gallup, Robert Smith, Porl Thompson, Laurence Tolhurst, Boris Williams	2:52
7.	"Throw Down"		0:45
8.	"Chunks"	Jack Kelly, Tony Perez (both of Last Rights)	2:09

== Personnel ==
- Lee Ranaldo – backing vocals on "Little Fury Things"
- Murph – drums
- Lou Barlow – bass, ukulele, vocals
- J. Mascis – guitar, vocals
