= There Near =

Studio album by Dinosaur Jr.
- Released: August 28, 2026
- Studios: Bisquiteen Studio, Amherst, Massachusetts
- Genres: Alternative rock; indie rock
- Length: 42:13
- Label: Jagjaguwar
- Producer: J Mascis

Dinosaur Jr. chronology
Sweep It Into Space (2021)	There Near (2026)

Singles from There Near
- 1. "Several Got Away" Released: June 30, 2026; 2. "Blowin' Up" Released: July 29, 2026

There Near is the thirteenth studio album by the American alternative rock band Dinosaur Jr., released on August 28, 2026, via Jagjaguwar. It is the band's first studio album since 2021's Sweep It Into Space.

Lead singer J Mascis played the album on a Mesa Boogie Mark I guitar amplifier, the same the band used on their 1985's debut Dinosaur. Mascis said in a press release that "As the years went on into the MK 2 and so on, the Boogie got more metal sounding. But the MK 1 has a souped-up Fender sound" and that it has "a real interesting sound I haven't gotten for a while", which he wanted to return to. He got the idea from Rick Rubin's advice for bands to listen to their first album and get back to its sound.

== Background ==
On June 30, 2026, Dinosaur Jr. announced the album alongside an US tour on fall and released the lead single "Several Got Away". The second single "Blowin' Up" was released on July 29, 2026.

== Critical reception ==
At Metacritic, There Near received a score of 81 out of 100, based on 14 reviews, indicating "universal acclaim".

Professional ratings
Aggregate scores
Source	Rating
Metacritic	81/100
Review scores
Source	Rating
AllMusic	3.5/5 stars
Clash	7/10
Mojo	4/5 stars
Paste	B
Pitchfork	8.0/10
Uncut	4.5/5 stars

== Track listing ==
All tracks are written by J Mascis, except "Blowin' Up" and "No One's Ready" (written by Lou Barlow).

There Near – Standard edition
No.	Title	Length
1.	"Several Got Away"	3:33
2.	"No Friends"	3:48
3.	"Everything at Once"	4:14
4.	"Take Me With You"	3:23
5.	"Blowin' Up"	3:05
6.	"Gone Off"	3:33
7.	"Clam Along"	4:48
8.	"Walk Me Back"	3:56
9.	"Read the Room"	4:22
10.	"Put It Down"	4:17
11.	"No One's Ready"	3:14
Total length:		42:13

There Near – Deluxe edition
No.	Title	Length
12.	"Stay Warm"
13.	"Turning Sour"

== Personnel ==
Credits are adapted from the album's liner notes and Tidal.

=== Dinosaur Jr. ===
- J Mascis – guitars, production, engineering
- Lou Barlow – bass
- Patrick Murphy – drums

=== Additional personnel ===
- Mark Miller – engineering
- Will Killingsworth – engineering
- Don McAulay – drum sound sculpting
- John Agnello – mixing
- Steve Fallone – mastering
- Ken Mauri – piano (tracks 3, 10), organ (track 10)
- Andrea Dezsö – cover art
- Julia Fletcher – design

== Charts ==
Chart performance for There Near
Chart (2026)	Peak position
Austrian Albums (Ö3 Austria)	47
Belgian Albums (Ultratop Flanders)	146
Croatian International Albums (HDU)	5
French Physical Albums (SNEP)	47
German Albums (Offizielle Top 100)	15
Scottish Albums (Official Charts)	15
Swedish Physical Albums (Sverigetopplistan)	5
Swiss Albums (Schweizer Hitparade)	57
UK Independent Albums (Official Charts)	8
US Top Album Sales (Billboard)	22
US Indie Store Album Sales (Billboard)	6
