= Brace the Wave =

Studio album by Lou Barlow
- Released: September 4, 2015
- Genre: Folk rock, lo-fi, alternative rock
- Label: Joyful Noise Recordings, US - Domino Recording Company, UK & Europe

Lou Barlow chronology
Goodnight Unknown (2009)	Brace the Wave (2015)	Reason to Live (2021)

Professional ratings
Review scores
Source	Rating
AllMusic	4/5 stars
The A.V. Club	B
Consequence of Sound	B−
The Irish Times	3/5 stars
Pitchfork	7.1/10
Spin	6/10

Brace the Wave is the third solo studio album from Sebadoh and Folk Implosion frontman Lou Barlow. It was released in September 2015. All instruments were played by Barlow.

== Track listing ==
All tracks are written by Lou Barlow.

Side one
No.	Title	Length
1.	"Redeemed"	3:14
2.	"Nerve"	2:52
3.	"Moving"	4:08
4.	"Pulse"	4:13

Side two
No.	Title	Length
1.	"Wave"	2:52
2.	"Lazy"	2:33
3.	"Boundaries"	2:59
4.	"C + E"	3:18
5.	"Repeat"	4:01
Total length:		30:10

== Personnel ==
- Lou Barlow – All instruments
- Justin Pizzoferrato – producer and engineer
