= Emoh =

Studio album by Lou Barlow
- Released: January 24, 2005
- Recorded: 2004
- Studios: The Beech House Recording Megaplex in Wedgewood Sound, Nashville, Tennessee, United States
- Genres: Folk rock, lo-fi
- Length: 50:14
- Labels: Merge (U.S., MRG254); Domino (UK, WIG153)
- Producers: Mark Nevers, Mark Miller, Josh Schwartz, Wally Gagel

Lou Barlow chronology
Songs from Loobiecore (2002)	Emoh (2005)	Goodnight Unknown (2009)

Professional ratings
Aggregate scores
Source	Rating
Metacritic	63/100
Review scores
Source	Rating
AllMusic	link
Pitchfork	(7.9/10) link
Rolling Stone	no.967, p.84
Uncut	p.108

Emoh is a solo album by Lou Barlow, the first with his real name; the album was released in the US in 2005 by Domino and by Merge Records and recorded in 2004.

Rolling Stone gave the album 3 stars out of 5 and noted: "[F]ull of quiet lyricism and Nick Drake beauty..." Uncut (p. 108) gave 4 stars out of 5 and said: "Using acoustic guitar, piano and vocals, he delivers 14 sweetly somber neo-folk tunes that reveal just how subtly persuasive the man's influence really is."

The album was recorded when Barlow was "in a better place" after some years of struggling due to Sebadoh's hiatus, John Davis leaving The Folk Implosion and personal problems. When the album was re-released in 2020, Barlow reflected: "Though Emoh was an overwhelmingly positive step forward for me, listening now, I realize the songs have a lot of pain in them. They clearly track the slow dissolution of my first marriage, the fatal break of several partnerships, and my struggle to acclimate to living in LA. Emoh is primarily an acoustic LP with live performances at its core, and that was a personal achievement for me. I’m still very pleased with it."

== Track listing ==
1. "Holding Back the Year" – 3:30
2. "Home" – 3:23
3. "Caterpillar Girl" – 3:35
4. "Legendary" – 4:11
5. "Royalty" – 3:45
6. "Puzzle" – 3:36
7. "If I Could" – 3:42
8. "Monkey Begun" – 3:02
9. "Morning's After Me" – 3:44
10. "Round-N-Round" – 2:34
11. "Mary" – 3:10
12. "Confused" – 3:45
13. "Imagined Life" – 4:14
14. "The Ballad of Daykitty" – 4:03

=== 2020 reissue ===
15. Finger (Demo) 16. Helpless (Demo) 17. Legendary (Demo) 18. Puzzle (Demo) 19. Home (Demo) 20. If I Could (Demo) 21. Mary (Demo) 22. Confused (Demo)

== Personnel ==
- Lou Barlow – vocals, acoustic and electric guitars, baritone electric guitar, bass, harp, piano, Korg bass and Roland Juno synthesizer, chord organ, Roland percussion pad, (sampled) percussion, xylophone, glockenspiel, backing vocals
- Imaad Wasif – acoustic guitar (tracks 1, 4), electric guitar (1, 4, 12), slide guitar (12), percussion (4, 5), backing vocals (4)
- Carey Kotsionis – harmony vocals (1, 7)
- Jason Loewenstein – drums, knee slapping (1, 12)
- Erin Hugely – cello (2, 11)
- Russell Pollard – cut-up drums (3)
- Abby Barlow – cello (6)
- Mark Schwaber – electric guitar and bass (6)
- Adam Harding – harmony vocals, electric guitar and piano (9)

Production

- Mark Nevers – recording (1, 2, 7, 11, 12, Beech House, Nashville, TN), mix (1, 2, 7, 11, Wedgewood, Nashville)
- Josh Schwartz – recording (4), mix (4, 10, 12, 14, Spaceshed, Los Angeles)
- Lou Barlow – recording (5, 8, 9, 10, 13, 14, at home, Los Angeles), mix (5, 8, 9, 13, at home)
- Mark Miller – recording and mix (6, Slaughterhouse, Hadley, MA)
- Mark Chalecki – mastering (Capitol Studios, Hollywood, CA)
