= Losers (album) =

Studio album by Lou Barlow
- Released: 1991
- Studio: home-recorded album
- Genres: Folk rock, lo-fi
- Label: Shrimper
- Producer: Lou Barlow

Lou Barlow chronology
Losers (1991)	Most of the WORST and Some of the Best of Sentridoh (1992)

Losers is the first official album by Sentridoh, the solo home recording project of American rock musician, Lou Barlow, of Sebadoh and Folk Implosion. It was self-released on cassette in 1990, and officially released by Shrimper Records on cassette in 1991.

In 1995 it was re-issued by Shrimper with an altered track listing as The Original Losing Losers, on CD and as a double album on vinyl.

Several songs on the album were re-released on future Sentridoh albums. "Only Losers," "Breakdown Day," "Rise Below Slowly" and "Mellow, Cool and Painfully Aware" were re-released on Winning Losers: A Collection of Home Recordings (1994). "Blonde in the Bleachers" was re-released on Another Collection of Home Recordings (1994). These songs were omitted from The Original Losing Losers, along with other revisions to the track listing.

== Music ==
The liner notes to The Original Losing Losers note that the album was "recorded at home on whatever." The album contains an early version of the Sebadoh song "The Freed Pig," which appeared on the band's 1991 album III, and a cover of "Blonde in the Bleachers" by Canadian folk musician, Joni Mitchell.

== Reception ==
In a review of The Original Losing Losers, Allmusic's Peter J. D'Angelo wrote "the real beauty of the record is the way that the chronologically distanced recordings interact with one another to turn the entire record into a sort of bizarre musical experiment...Sentridoh is wild ride of bizarre recordings that will certainly appeal to die-hard Barlow fans and will even more likely drive his detractors to madness."

== Track listing ==
1. "Columbus"
2. "The Freed Pig"
3. "Only Losers"
4. "Normal Way"
5. "I See You Running"
6. "Antheneezal"
7. "K-Sensa-My II"
8. "Coolest Hurt"
9. "Growing"
10. "Love Up Above"
11. "You Fell Down The Stairs/Pink Twinkie"
12. "Blonde In The Bleachers"
13. "Face Down/High-D"
14. "Strange Love"
15. "Mellow, Cool And Painfully Aware"
16. "Bay City Baby/Blind Dove"
17. "I Feel Good Inside About Me Inside Me"
18. "Breakdown Day"
19. "Afraid Of Babies"
20. "Old Wife Cried"
21. "I Will Be Lonely All My Life"
22. "Favorite Letter"
23. "Rise Below Slowly"
24. "Give Up"
25. "Morning Rain"
26. "Six Days Without Shaving"
27. "Wipe It Out"
28. "Fleshy True"
29. "Colix Jauntarah"
30. "Win Slow"
31. "Weed Forestin"
32. "Sebadough"
33. "Mojain Plane"
34. "Try To Get What You Want, Never Get It"
35. "I'm So Depressed"
36. "Wendin Will"
37. "The Free Man"

=== The Original Losing Losers (1995) ===
1. "Commercial"
2. "Columbus"
3. "Freed Pig"
4. "Brotherly Love"
5. "I See You Running"
6. "Antheneezal"
7. "K-Sensa-My II"
8. "Cause For Celebration"
9. "Afraid Of Babies"
10. "Old Wife Cried"
11. "Growing"
12. "The Love Up Above"
13. "Blind Dove"
14. "I Feel Good Inside About Me"
15. "Perfect Excuse"
16. "Strange Love"
17. "Face Down"
18. "Bay City Baby"
19. "Pet Your Puppy"
20. "King Of The Dull Thump"
21. "Give Up"
22. "Morning Rain"
23. "A Completely Gifted Man"
24. "Smuxek"
25. "Fleshy True"
26. "I Will Be Lonely All My Life"
27. "Take An Asprin II & I"
28. "Beyond The Barbwire"
29. "Purple And Green"
30. "Winslow"
31. "Try To Get What You Want"
32. "Nothing"
33. "Wipe It Out"
34. "Coolest Hurt"
35. "Colix Jguntarah"
36. "Weed Forestin"
37. "Normal Way"
38. "You Fell Down The Stairs, Pink Twinkie"
39. "Mojam Plane"
40. "Meaningless Dead End"
41. "Wond In Will"
42. "The Free Man"
43. "Untitled"
