= Give a Glimpse of What Yer Not =

Studio album by Dinosaur Jr.
- Released: August 5, 2016
- Recorded: Bisquiteen Studio, Amherst, Massachusetts
- Genres: Alternative rock; indie rock
- Length: 46:12
- Label: Jagjaguwar
- Producer: J Mascis

Dinosaur Jr. chronology
I Bet on Sky (2012)	Give a Glimpse of What Yer Not (2016)	Sweep It Into Space (2021)

Singles from Give a Glimpse of What Yer Not
- 1. "Tiny" Released: 2016; 2. "Goin Down" Released: 2016

Give a Glimpse of What Yer Not is the eleventh studio album by alternative rock band Dinosaur Jr. It was announced on May 24 and was released on August 5, 2016. The music video for first single "Tiny" was released on June 20. The second single, "Goin Down", was released on July 27. The name of the album is taken from the line of the "Knocked Around" lyrics.

The artwork was created by German painter Daniel Richter, who is a fan of the band. The image is based on the 2012 piece "A Flower in Flames", and consists of a background of meandering, psychedelic lines against a mountain range, and, in the foreground, an Asian fighter wielding a guitar.

== Critical reception ==
Professional ratings
Aggregate scores
Source	Rating
Metacritic	80/100
Review scores
Source	Rating
AllMusic	4.5/5 stars
The A.V. Club	A−
Exclaim!	7/10
Mojo	4/5 stars
Paste	8.7/10
Pitchfork	7.5/10
PopMatters	8/10 stars
Rolling Stone	3.5/5 stars
Slant Magazine	3.5/5 stars
Spin	7/10

Give a Glimpse of What Yer Not received positive reviews from critics upon its release. At Metacritic, which assigns a normalized rating out of 100 to reviews from mainstream publications, the album received an average score of 80, based on 31 reviews, indicating "generally favorable reviews". Writing for Exclaim!, Ian Gormely praised the band's ability to "push the boundaries of their sound without tarnishing their own legacy."

=== Accolades ===
Publication	Accolade	Year	Rank	Ref.
Mojo	The 50 Best Albums of 2016	2016	17	

== Track listing ==
All songs written by J Mascis except as noted.

No.	Title	Writer(s)	Length
1.	"Goin Down"		4:03
2.	"Tiny"		3:12
3.	"Be a Part"		4:38
4.	"I Told Everyone"		3:40
5.	"Love Is..."	Lou Barlow	3:40
6.	"Good to Know"		3:28
7.	"I Walk for Miles"		5:35
8.	"Lost All Day"		5:06
9.	"Knocked Around"		4:46
10.	"Mirror"		4:17
11.	"Left/Right"	Barlow	3:52
Total length:			46:12

== Charts ==
Chart (2016)	Peak position
Australian Albums (ARIA)	38
Austrian Albums (Ö3 Austria)	35
Belgian Albums (Ultratop Flanders)	39
Dutch Albums (Album Top 100)	49
French Albums (SNEP)	129
German Albums (Offizielle Top 100)	18
Irish Albums (IRMA)	49
New Zealand Heatseekers Albums (RMNZ)	3
Scottish Albums (Official Charts)	7
Swedish Albums (Sverigetopplistan)	56
Swiss Albums (Schweizer Hitparade)	31
UK Albums (Official Charts)	23
US Billboard 200	72

== Personnel ==
Dinosaur Jr.

- J Mascis – lead vocals (tracks 1–4, 6–10), guitars, producer
- Lou Barlow – bass, lead vocals (tracks 5, 11)
- Murph – drums, percussion

Technical

- Daniel Richter – artwork
- Miles Johnson – design
- Justin Pizzoferrato – sound engineer
- Marc Seedorf – sound engineer
- Mark Miller – sound engineer
- Mike McKoy – layout
- Serling Rooks Ferrara McKoy & Worob, LLP – layout
- Greg Calbi – mastering
- Ray Janos – mastering
- John Agnello – mixing
  - Recorded at Bisquiteen
  - Mastered at Sterling Sound
  - Mixed at Bisquiteen
