= I Bet on Sky =

Studio album by Dinosaur Jr.
- Released: September 18, 2012
- Genres: Alternative rock; indie rock
- Length: 46:53
- Labels: Jagjaguwar, PIAS
- Producer: J Mascis

Dinosaur Jr. chronology
Farm (2009)	I Bet on Sky (2012)	Give a Glimpse of What Yer Not (2016)

I Bet on Sky is the tenth studio album by the alternative rock band Dinosaur Jr. It was announced on June 13, 2012, and was released on September 17 in Europe and September 18 in the US. "Watch the Corners" was given a music video and promoted via a free MP3.

In 2012 it was awarded a silver certification from the Independent Music Companies Association, which indicated sales of at least 20,000 copies throughout Europe.

== Critical reception ==
At Metacritic, which assigns a weighted average rating out of 100 to reviews from mainstream critics, I Bet on Sky has received an average score of 75, based on 33 reviews, indicating "generally favorable reviews".

Professional ratings
Aggregate scores
Source	Rating
Metacritic	75/100
Review scores
Source	Rating
AllMusic	4/5 stars
Alternative Press	3/5 stars
Drowned in Sound	8/10
The Guardian	3/5 stars
Mojo	3/5 stars
NME	8/10
The Observer	3/5 stars
Paste	8.4/10
Pitchfork	7.9/10
Uncut	7/10

== Track listing ==
All songs written by J Mascis except as noted.

No.	Title	Writer(s)	Length
1.	"Don't Pretend You Didn't Know"		5:30
2.	"Watch the Corners"		5:00
3.	"Almost Fare"		4:50
4.	"Stick a Toe In"		5:20
5.	"Rude"	Lou Barlow	2:50
6.	"I Know It Oh So Well"		4:40
7.	"Pierce the Morning Rain"		2:45
8.	"What Was That"		5:28
9.	"Recognition"	Barlow	3:50
10.	"See It on Your Side"		6:40
Total length:			46:53

Japanese Edition Bonus Tracks
No.	Title	Writer(s)	Length
11.	"Black Betty"	Traditional	2:39

== Personnel ==
Dinosaur Jr.

- J Mascis - guitar, vocals, keyboards, production
- Lou Barlow - bass, vocals
- Murph - drums

Technical

- John Agnello - mixing, engineering
- Greg Calbi - mastering
- Justin Pizzoferrato - engineering
- Daniel Murphy - design
- Travis Millard - artwork
