= Farm (album) =

Studio album by Dinosaur Jr.
- Released: June 23, 2009
- Recorded: 2008 – 2009
- Studios: Bisquiteen Studio, Amherst, Massachusetts
- Genres: Alternative rock; grunge
- Length: 60:28
- Label: Jagjaguwar
- Producer: J Mascis

Dinosaur Jr. chronology
Beyond (2007)	Farm (2009)	I Bet on Sky (2012)

Farm is the ninth studio album by American alternative rock band Dinosaur Jr. It is the band's first release on the record label Jagjaguwar.

The first editions of the album came with a free white-vinyl 7 inch with the songs "I Don't Wanna Go There" and "Tarpit", recorded live for Pitchfork TV.

The original European version had a mastering error – the volume was 3 dB too loud. The European label PIAS Recordings recalled the affected copies to exchange them with correct ones.

The band released a video for "Over It," directed by Mark Locke. It featured the band members riding around an urban setting on BMX bikes and a skateboard, performing stunts and pratfalls; professional riders were used as stunt doubles. It featured a brief cameo from Mike Watt.

Farm debuted at No. 29 on the Billboard 200, making it the band's highest-charting album in the US. It has gone on to sell over 51,000 copies in US. In 2012 it was awarded a double silver certification from the Independent Music Companies Association, which indicated sales of at least 40,000 copies throughout Europe.

== Reception ==
Professional ratings
Aggregate scores
Source	Rating
Metacritic	76/100
Review scores
Source	Rating
AllMusic	4/5 stars
The A.V. Club	A−
Drowned In Sound	8/10
NME	7/10
Pitchfork	8.5/10
PopMatters	7/10 stars
Rolling Stone	3.5/5 stars
Spin	7/10
Sputnikmusic	4/5 stars
Uncut	4/5 stars

On Metacritic, Farm received a score of 76 out of 100, indicating "generally favorable reviews" based on 26 reviews.

== Track listing ==
All tracks are written by J Mascis except where noted.

No.	Title	Writer(s)	Length
1.	"Pieces"		4:30
2.	"I Want You to Know"		4:30
3.	"Ocean in the Way"		4:19
4.	"Plans"		6:40
5.	"Your Weather"	Lou Barlow	3:06
6.	"Over It"		3:47
7.	"Friends"		4:31
8.	"Said the People"		7:41
9.	"There's No Here"		3:37
10.	"See You"		5:46
11.	"I Don't Wanna Go There"		8:40
12.	"Imagination Blind"	Barlow	3:21
Total length:			60:28

Deluxe edition bonus tracks
No.	Title	Writer(s)	Length
13.	"Houses"	Elyse Weinberg	3:38
14.	"Whenever You're Ready"	Rod Argent	2:58
15.	"Creepies"		2:06
16.	"Show"		1:00
Total length:			70:47

== Personnel ==
Dinosaur Jr.

- J Mascis – lead vocals, guitars, producer, writer (1–4, 6–11, 15–16)
- Lou Barlow – bass, vocals, lead vocals (tracks 5, 12)
- Murph – drums, percussion

Technical

- Justin Pizzoferrato – sound engineer
- John Agnello – sound engineer, mixing
- Greg Calbi – mastering
- Marq Spusta – artwork
- Daniel Murphy – graphic design
- Mike McKoy – layout
  - Recorded at Bisquiteen
  - Mastered at Sterling Sound
  - Mixed at Bisquiteen
