= You're Living All over Me =

Studio album by Dinosaur Jr.
- Released: 1987
- Recorded: 1987
- Studios: Pine Tracks, Fun City
- Genres: Indie rock; alternative rock; noise rock
- Length: 36:08
- Label: SST (130)
- Producer: Wharton Tiers

Dinosaur Jr. chronology
| Dinosaur (1985) | You're Living All over Me (1987) | Bug (1988) |

You're Living All over Me is the second studio album by American alternative rock band Dinosaur Jr. It was released in 1987, through SST Records.

A refinement of the formula introduced on the band's debut album Dinosaur, You're Living All over Me features drawling vocals paired with loud guitars and driving rhythms, presaging grunge. The album was well-reviewed upon release, and is now regarded as one of the greatest and most influential albums in alternative rock.

== Background and release ==
The album was originally issued when the band was still known as Dinosaur, before a lawsuit forced the name change to Dinosaur Jr. The album was recalled by SST a few months after release, and new copies were printed crediting the band as Dinosaur Jr.

They released their first album, Dinosaur, in 1985, largely to critical indifference and low sales—only about 1,500 copies were sold in its first year.

After the record's release, Dinosaur often performed in New York. The New York-based alternative rock band Sonic Youth was unimpressed by the first Dinosaur performance they saw. However, after watching them play several months later, they approached the band declaring themselves fans, and invited the band to join them on tour in the American Northeast and northern Midwest in September 1986.

The album's title was long rumored to have been a phrase uttered by singer/guitarist J Mascis in frustration at the cramped conditions of a lengthy tour. However, Mascis has denied this story, claiming, "I thought of it more like my sister… You know someone just like, bugging me at the time."

The band made a music video for the song "Little Fury Things", which was directed by Jim Spring and Jens Jurgensen.

== Music ==
"Sludgefeast"
A sample of "Sludgefeast", the third track from the album.

You're Living All over Me has been primarily categorized as an indie rock, alternative rock, noise rock, and grunge album, and has often been noted for its influence on these genres. Pitchfork described the album's sound as "a mix of hardcore punk blitz, heavy metal guitars, folk rock freak-outs, and a touch of pure pop." The album represents a refinement in the band's craft following their debut album, Dinosaur, while retaining its lo-fi aesthetic.

While Mascis was again the primary songwriter, Lou Barlow contributed the last two songs, the punk-influenced "Lose" and the experimental "Poledo". "Poledo" is different from the rest of the album in that the first half is a low-fidelity recording of Barlow singing and playing ukulele, much like he did with his own group Sebadoh, while the second half is a collection of sound collages and abstract noise pieces.

Music critic Byron Coley described the guitar work as "unearthly". He wrote: "The sound on You're Living All over Me is mesmerizing, both distant and close at the same time."

== Critical reception ==
NME published a rave review of You're Living All over Me upon the album's 1987 release, with the magazine's Jack Barron declaring it "the most agape rock music to have come out of America this year" and calling the band "the missing link between Hüsker Dü and R.E.M.".

Critic Robert Christgau gave the album a "B+" grade in The Village Voice and wrote, "All these growing malcontents want is a little structure and meaning in their lives. Is that so much to ask?"

== Legacy ==
Retrospective professional ratings
Review scores
| Source | Rating |
|---|---|
| AllMusic | 5/5 stars |
| Entertainment Weekly | A |
| Mojo | 5/5 stars |
| Paste | 4.5/5 stars |
| Pitchfork | 9.1/10 |
| PopMatters | 8/10 |
| The Rolling Stone Album Guide | 2/5 stars |
| Spin Alternative Record Guide | 10/10 |
| Stylus Magazine | A− |
| Uncut | 5/5 stars |

The album is considered a classic of indie and alternative rock. In 1995, it was ranked fifth on Alternative Press magazine's "Top 99 Albums of '85 to '95" list. In 2005, it was placed at number 31 on Spin's list of the 100 greatest albums from 1985 through to 2005. Pitchfork included You're Living All over Me at number 40 on its 2002 list of the best albums of the 1980s, and at number 46 on a new edition of the list published in 2018. Beats per Minute listed the record as the 17th-best album of the 1980s. It was included in the book 1001 Albums You Must Hear Before You Die. It is J. Mascis' favorite album that Dinosaur Jr. made. Pitchfork wrote in 2018, "Nothing about Dinosaur Jr.'s chaotic music should have worked. [...] But on You're Living All over Me, the western Massachusetts trio made it mesh, and, in the process, altered the fabric of independent rock music forever."

You're Living All over Me has also proven to be greatly influential, especially on the shoegaze genre. Kevin Shields of My Bloody Valentine has named the album, among others, as an influence on his band's seminal You Made Me Realise EP; the two bands would eventually tour together. Several sources recognize the album's influence on Nirvana. The title of the song "Little Fury Bugs" from Death Cab for Cutie's 2000 album We Have the Facts and We're Voting Yes is a reference to "Little Fury Things".

In 2005, You're Living All over Me was performed live in its entirety as part of the All Tomorrow's Parties-curated Don't Look Back series.

In 2011, Nick Attfield wrote a book about the album as part of Continuum's 33⅓ series.

In 2016, Josh Gray of Clash wrote: "Living...'s influence on every major late 80s/early 90s guitar act cannot be overstated: it is likely that there would be no Bleach or Doolittle without it. Even Dinosaur Jr. themselves, upon reforming their original line-up twenty years later, seemed to single out this album as a high water mark of sound and energy that they would aim to recapture. Though its successor Bug turned out to be the band's breakthrough album, it was here that they set the sonic template they would continue to work from on every consequent record."

In 2023, Decibel wrote: "You’re Living All over Me is unquestionably one of the most important records in the development of alternative rock. This is a stone-cold fact. Four years before grunge catapulted underground music into the mainstream, Dinosaur Jr. laid out a practical blueprint for freaky, noisy “ear-bleeding country.” This is a style that has maintained its currency and continues to be particularly popular in contemporary music, even if it was more of an accidental invention for Dinosaur Jr., reflecting the trio’s enthusiasm for Black Sabbath and R.E.M."

== Track listing ==
All tracks are written by J Mascis, except as noted.

| No. | Title | Writer(s) | Length |
|---|---|---|---|
| 1. | "Little Fury Things" | | 3:06 |
| 2. | "Kracked" | | 2:50 |
| 3. | "SludgeFeast" | | 5:17 |
| 4. | "The Lung" | | 3:51 |
| 5. | "Raisans" | | 3:50 |
| 6. | "Tarpit" | | 4:36 |
| 7. | "In a Jar" | | 3:28 |
| 8. | "Lose" | Lou Barlow | 3:11 |
| 9. | "Poledo" | Lou Barlow | 5:43 |
| Total length: | | | 36:08 |

Bonus tracks
| No. | Title | Writer(s) | Length |
|---|---|---|---|
| 10. | "Show Me the Way" (on the SST CD version) | Peter Frampton | 3:45 |
| 11. | "Just like Heaven" (on the 2005 Merge and Imperial reissues) | Robert Smith, Simon Gallup, Porl Thompson, Boris Williams, Lol Tolhurst | 2:53 |
| 12. | "Throw Down" (on the 2005 Imperial reissue) | | 0:49 |
| 13. | "In a Jar" (live; on the 2005 Imperial reissue) |

== Personnel ==
Dinosaur Jr.

- J Mascis – guitar, percussion, lead vocals
- Lou Barlow – bass, ukulele, backing vocals, tape, lead vocals on "Lose" and "Poledo"
- Murph – drums

Additional personnel

- Lee Ranaldo – backing vocals on "Little Fury Things"

Technical personnel

- Wharton Tiers – producer, recording engineer
- Dave Pine – recording engineer
- Maura Jasper – artwork
