= Beyond (Dinosaur Jr. album) =

Studio album by Dinosaur Jr.
- Released: May 1, 2007
- Recorded: September–December 2006
- Venue: Bisquiteen (Amherst, MA)
- Genres: Alternative rock; indie rock; noise rock
- Length: 49:34
- Label: Fat Possum
- Producer: J Mascis

Dinosaur Jr. chronology
Hand It Over (1997)	Beyond (2007)	Farm (2009)

Beyond is the eighth studio album by the alternative rock band Dinosaur Jr. It was their first LP in a decade after 1997's Hand It Over, and the first album by the original lineup since 1988's Bug.

== Promotion ==
The band planned a full world tour in 2007 and played "Almost Ready" on the Late Show with David Letterman to support their album. A music video was made for "Been There All the Time", featuring Sonic Youth front-man Thurston Moore and his daughter, Coco. It was directed by Matt Dillon.

== Release ==
The album was released through Fat Possum Records in the US and through the Play It Again, Sam label in Europe, Australia, New Zealand and Japan. It was also released in Ukraine through Moon Records. Both Fat Possum and PIAS released limited edition versions of it containing an extra 7 inch with the 2:47 track "Yer Son". The respective labels would go on to reissue the album in 2014, 2015 and 2016, the former even releasing a downloadable 256 kbit/s MP3 version of it.

== Reception ==
Professional ratings
Aggregate scores
Source	Rating
Metacritic	79/100
Review scores
Source	Rating
AllMusic	4.5/5 stars
Blender	3.5/5 stars
Entertainment Weekly	B+
NME	8/10
Pitchfork	8.4/10
PopMatters	8/10 stars
Slant Magazine	4/5 stars
Spin	7/10
Sputnikmusic	3.5/5 stars
Stylus Magazine	B+

The album has a Metacritic score of 79 based on 31 reviews, indicating "[g]enerally favorable reviews". Zach Baron of Pitchfork gave the album a very positive review, comparing it favorably to other comebacks of the year. He writes: "Beneath Beyond's crystalline production is the sublime result: years and years of weariness and aging and conflict put back into the bottle. [...] Less a theme park of the past and more of an actual trip there [...] Beyond is nostalgic for everything but the band's own glory days. If anything, it's an exercise in making their entire twenty-year output sound contemporary again." Stephen Thomas Erlewine wrote that the "very existence of this new album is a surprise, but the real shock is that Beyond is a flat-out great record, a startling return to form for J Mascis as a guitarist and songwriter and Dinosaur Jr. as a band." He found the album to be less noisy and more stylistically diverse than the earlier efforts of the trio ("this sounds like the album that could have been released instead of Green Mind if Lou had stuck around, or if Dinosaur made the kind of grand major-label debut many expected them to deliver in the days before Nevermind.") He also finds the album to be "very different" from their past efforts "in that for the first time, Mascis is assertive about his talent. He sounds engaged -- in music, in life [...] -- and it gives the album a powerful sense of purpose that the classic Dinosaur albums were lacking by their very design." He concludes by writing that "Beyond isn't merely a worthy album from a reunited band, it's simply a great record by any standard."

A mixed review from Q said that "the spark that made initial albums such as Bug so special is still missing." [May 2007, p. 123]

=== Accolades ===
Publication	Country	Accolade	Rank
Paste	US	The 100 Best Albums of 2007	98
Pitchfork	US	The 50 Best Albums of 2007	28
WOXY.com	US	97 Best Albums of 2007	67
Classic Rock	UK	Top Albums of 2007	17
Uncut	UK	Top Albums of 2007	50
Glide	US	Glide's Best Albums of the Decade	42

== In popular culture ==
"Almost Ready" was used on the Major League Baseball 2K8 and Skate 3 soundtracks, and "Pick Me Up" is downloadable content from the Rock Band series. The songs "Almost Ready" and "Crumble" were used in Alien Workshop's skateboarding film Mind Field.

== Track listing ==
All tracks are written by J Mascis except where noted.

No.	Title	Writer(s)	Length
1.	"Almost Ready"		3:08
2.	"Crumble"		4:04
3.	"Pick Me Up"		6:32
4.	"Back to Your Heart"	Lou Barlow	4:31
5.	"This Is All I Came to Do"		5:21
6.	"Been There All the Time"		3:40
7.	"It's Me"		5:14
8.	"We're Not Alone"		4:35
9.	"I Got Lost"		4:37
10.	"Lightning Bulb"	Lou Barlow	3:45
11.	"What If I Knew"		4:01
Total length:			49:34

Japanese Edition Bonus Tracks
No.	Title	Length
12.	"Yer Son"	2:51
13.	"Tiny Town"	0:40

== Personnel ==
Dinosaur Jr.

- J Mascis – lead vocals, guitars, production, writer (1–3, 5–9, 11)
- Lou Barlow – bass, vocals, writer (4, 10)
- Murph – drums, percussion

Technical

- Rick Myers – design, artwork
- John Agnello – sound engineer
- Justin Pizzoferrato – sound engineer
- Greg Calbi – mastering
- John Agnello – mixing
- Burk Uzzle – cover photography
- Philipp Virus – photography
  - Recorded and mixed at Bisquiteen, Amherst, MA.
  - Mastered at Sterling Sound, NYC.

== Charts ==
Beyond debuted at No. 69 on the Billboard 200 and peaked at No. 19 on the Top Rock Albums chart. In 2012 it was awarded a double silver certification from the Independent Music Companies Association, which indicated sales of at least 40,000 copies throughout Europe.

Year	Chart	Peak position
2007	Billboard 200	69
