= Sweep It Into Space =

Studio album by Dinosaur Jr.
- Released: April 23, 2021
- Recorded: 2019–2020
- Studios: Bisquiteen Studio, Amherst, Massachusetts
- Length: 44:53
- Label: Jagjaguwar
- Producers: J Mascis, Kurt Vile

Dinosaur Jr. chronology
| Give a Glimpse of What Yer Not (2016) | Sweep It Into Space (2021) | There Near (2026) |

Singles from Sweep It Into Space
- 1. "I Ran Away" Released: February 23, 2021; 2. "Garden" Released: March 31, 2021; 3. "Garden" Released: April 21, 2021

Sweep It Into Space is the twelfth studio album by alternative rock band Dinosaur Jr., which was released on April 23, 2021, through Jagjaguwar. The first single from the album, "I Ran Away", was released on February 23, 2021, with a music video for the song being released on March 3, 2021. A music video for the album's second single, "Garden", was released on March 31, 2021.. The album's third and final single and music video for "Take It Back" was released on April 21, 2021.

== Background ==
Originally scheduled for release in mid-2020, the record was delayed due to the COVID-19 pandemic. The album was recorded at Amherst's Bisquiteen in late 2019 following the group's West Coast/South East tour. Lou Barlow wrote two of the twelve songs, with the only other musician credited aside from the group being Kurt Vile who played Twelve-string guitar on "I Ran Away".

== Reception ==
Professional ratings
Aggregate scores
| Source | Rating |
|---|---|
| Metacritic | 80/100 |
Review scores
| Source | Rating |
| AllMusic | 4/5 stars |
| Exclaim! | 8/10 |
| Paste | 7.8/10 |
| Pitchfork | 7.3/10 |
| Slant Magazine | 4/5 stars |

Sweep It Into Space earned a great deal of critical praise with an overall 80/100 score on Metacritic. Charley Ruddell of WBUR-FM called the album "lively and homespun" and said "The album isn’t meant to build on anything the band has already done, but instead revive the spontaneity and DIY of a tight rock band making a rock record." Brad Cohan of the Chicago Reader called it "the best of their version 2.0 output." Ed Condran of The Spokesman-Review singled out Lou Barlow's contributions calling them "two of the album’s finest cuts."

== Track listing ==
All tracks are written by J Mascis, except where noted.

Sweep It Into Space track listing
| No. | Title | Writer(s) | Length |
|---|---|---|---|
| 1. | "I Ain't" | | 4:10 |
| 2. | "I Met the Stones" | | 3:45 |
| 3. | "To Be Waiting" | | 4:12 |
| 4. | "I Ran Away" | | 3:30 |
| 5. | "Garden" | Lou Barlow | 3:02 |
| 6. | "Hide Another Round" | | 3:58 |
| 7. | "And Me" | | 3:35 |
| 8. | "I Expect It Always" | | 3:40 |
| 9. | "Take It Back" | | 4:02 |
| 10. | "N Say" | | 3:15 |
| 11. | "Walking to You" | | 4:40 |
| 12. | "You Wonder" | Lou Barlow | 3:04 |
| Total length: | | | 44:53 |

Japanese edition bonus tracks
| No. | Title | Length |
|---|---|---|
| 13. | "To Be Waiting" (Live from Look Park) | 3:59 |
| 14. | "Garden" (Live from Look Park) | 3:24 |
| Total length: | | 46:41 |

== Personnel ==
Dinosaur Jr.

- J Mascis – lead vocals (1–4, 6–11), guitars (1–4, 6–11), production, sound engineer, bass (5, 12)
- Lou Barlow – bass (1–4, 6–11), backing vocals, lead vocals (5, 12), guitars (5, 12)
- Murph – drums, percussion

Additional personnel

- Kurt Vile – production, guitars (2, 4, 10), backing vocals (1, 2, 4, 6, 8, 10)
- Greg Calbi – mastering
- John Agnello – mixing
- Justin Pizzoferrato – sound engineer
- Marc Seedorf – sound engineer
- Mark Miller – sound engineer
- Joe Nino-Hernes – lacquer cut
- Miles Johnson – layout
- Andy Hope 1930 – artwork

== Charts ==
Chart performance for Sweep It Into Space
| Chart (2021) | Peak position |
|---|---|
| Australian Albums (ARIA) | 61 |
| Austrian Albums (Ö3 Austria) | 35 |
| Belgian Albums (Ultratop Flanders) | 21 |
| Belgian Albums (Ultratop Wallonia) | 111 |
| Dutch Albums (Album Top 100) | 82 |
| German Albums (Offizielle Top 100) | 9 |
| New Zealand Albums (RMNZ) | 40 |
| Scottish Albums (Official Charts) | 6 |
| Swedish Physical Albums (Sverigetopplistan) | 5 |
| Swiss Albums (Schweizer Hitparade) | 34 |
| UK Albums (Official Charts) | 29 |
| UK Independent Albums (Official Charts) | 2 |
| US Billboard 200 | 115 |
| US Independent Albums (Billboard) | 15 |
| US Top Rock Albums (Billboard) | 18 |
