= Without a Sound =

Studio album by Dinosaur Jr.
- Released: August 23, 1994
- Recorded: 1994
- Genre: Alternative rock
- Length: 45:42
- Label: Blanco y Negro/Sire
- Producer: J Mascis

Dinosaur Jr. chronology
Where You Been (1993)	Without a Sound (1994)	Hand It Over (1997)

Singles from Without a Sound
- 1. "Feel the Pain" Released: 1994; 2. "I Don't Think So" Released: 1994

Without a Sound is the sixth studio album by alternative rock band Dinosaur Jr., released on August 23, 1994 through Blanco y Negro Records and Sire Records. It is the first Dinosaur Jr. album not to feature Murph on drums, who is replaced by vocalist and guitarist J Mascis. It is also their most commercially successful album, peaking at number 44 on the Billboard Top 200. "Feel the Pain" and "I Don't Think So" were released as singles, with "Feel the Pain" reaching number 4 on the Billboard Modern Rock Tracks chart, becoming one of their biggest hits. Mascis later admitted that his father's death hung over this album, and he took three years to deliver the next Dinosaur Jr. LP, 1997's Hand It Over.

== Production and background ==
J Mascis said the album was his hardest to write. His father had died around the time they were making the album. The cover artwork is a painting by former professional skateboarder Neil Blender, an early fan and friend of the band. The album title comes from a lyric in the song "Even You".

== Reception ==
Professional ratings
Review scores
Source	Rating
AllMusic	4/5 stars
Chicago Tribune	2.5/4 stars
Entertainment Weekly	B+
Los Angeles Times	3/4 stars
The Philadelphia Inquirer	2/4 stars
PopMatters	8/10
Rolling Stone	2/5 stars
The Rolling Stone Album Guide	2.5/5 stars
Spin Alternative Record Guide	6/10
Uncut	7/10

In July 2014, Guitar World put Without a Sound in their "Superunknown: 50 Iconic Albums That Defined 1994" list.

The closing song "Over Your Shoulder" was frequently used on the Japanese boxing reality show Gachinko Fight Club. In February 2019, 25 years after the album's release, "Over Your Shoulder" unexpectedly charted at number 18 on the Billboard Japan Hot 100 based on digital streaming. The phenomenon was credited to YouTube postings of clips from Gachinko Fight Club registered as containing the song. For a period, clips from the series — which was a segment of a Japanese variety show — had frequently been favored by YouTube's algorithmic suggestions in Japan for unknown reasons.

== Track listing ==
All tracks are written by J Mascis.

No.	Title	Length
1.	"Feel the Pain"	4:18
2.	"I Don't Think So"	3:35
3.	"Yeah Right"	2:45
4.	"Outta Hand"	4:59
5.	"Grab It"	3:31
6.	"Even You"	3:23
7.	"Mind Glow"	4:02
8.	"Get Out of This"	5:21
9.	"On the Brink"	3:11
10.	"Seemed Like the Thing to Do"	5:45
11.	"Over Your Shoulder"	4:52
Total length:		45:42

=== 2019 remaster bonus tracks ===
In 2019, the album was reissued as an expanded 2-CD deluxe edition that contained bonus tracks, including a recording of a full live performance at Brixton Academy on October 8, 1994. A double vinyl version was also released, albeit with a smaller selection of bonus tracks.

CD 1: "Bonus Stuff"
No.	Title	Length
12.	"Get Out of This (No Words Just Solo)" ("Feel the Pain" single b-side)
13.	"Blah" (from Melrose Place soundtrack)
14.	"I Don't Think So (Instrumental)" (previously unreleased)
15.	"Outta Hand (Instrumental)" (previously unreleased)
16.	"Get Out of This (Instrumental)" (previously unreleased)
17.	"On The Brink (Instrumental)" (previously unreleased)
18.	"Seemed Like The Thing To Do (Alternate Mix)" (previously unreleased)

CD 2: "Live In London, 1994"
No.	Title	Length
1.	"Freak Scene" (previously unreleased)
2.	"Out There" (previously unreleased)
3.	"Get Me" ("I Don't Think So" single b-side)
4.	"Not You Again" (previously unreleased)
5.	"Grab It" ("Feel the Pain (Live)" Japanese-only EP b-side)
6.	"Feel The Pain" ("Feel the Pain (Live)" Japanese-only EP b-side)
7.	"Little Fury Things" (previously unreleased)
8.	"What Else Is New" ("I Don't Think So" CD single b-side)
9.	"Quest" (previously unreleased)
10.	"Thumb" (previously unreleased)
11.	"Sludgefeast" ("I Don't Think So" CD single b-side)

== Personnel ==
Dinosaur Jr.

- J Mascis - drums, guitar, keyboards, vocals
- Mike Johnson - bass, vocals
- Thalia Zedek - vocals on "Yeah Right," "Grab It," "Get Out of This"
- Greg Dwinell - pedal steel on "I Don't Think So"
- Walter Sear - theremin on "Outta Hand"
- Kurt Fedora - rhythm guitar on "Even You," "Get Out of This"

Technical

- John Agnello - Engineer, Mixing
- Danny Kadar - Assistant Engineer
- Mark Miller - Assistant Engineer
- Brian Sperber - Assistant Engineer
- John McLaughlin - Assistant Engineer
- Bryce Goggin - Assistant Engineer
- Bill Emmons - Assistant Engineer
- Joe Pirrera - Assistant Engineer
- Bob Ludwig - Mastering
- Woody Jackson - Paintings
- Roger Mayer - Sound Effects

== Charts ==
Album - Billboard (United States)

Year	Chart	Position
1994	The Billboard 200	44

Singles - Billboard (United States)

Year	Single	Chart	Position
1994	"Feel the Pain"	Modern Rock Tracks	4
