= Feel the Pain =

Single by Dinosaur Jr.

from the album Without a Sound
- Released: 1994
- Genre: Alternative rock; indie rock; grunge
- Length: 4:18
- Label: Blanco y Negro/Sire
- Songwriter: J Mascis
- Producer: J Mascis

Dinosaur Jr. singles chronology
"Out There" (1993)	"Feel the Pain" (1994)	"I Don't Think So" (1995)

"Feel the Pain" is a single by alternative rock band Dinosaur Jr. from their 1994 album Without a Sound. It was released as the debut single from the album the same year, reaching number four on the Modern Rock charts in the US and number 25 in the UK. A music video for the song was also released, helping boost the song's popularity.

Since its release, the song has been praised by critics for its guitar work and lyrics. It has since become one of the band's most popular songs.

== Background ==
Written by Dinosaur Jr. frontman J Mascis, "Feel the Pain" was recorded for the band's 1994 album Without a Sound. The track originated from a riff that Mascis had written while on tour; he recalled the song's creation in an interview, saying:

I had a riff for it. It might have been on that Jesus and Mary Chain tour, on the tour bus or van; I don't think we had a bus. I think it was in England. I was singing, "I feel the pain of everyone," when I was playing the riff. Then a friend, John Brattin, who was with me, said, "and then I feel nothing." And he let me keep the line.

When interviewed by Billboard, Dinosaur Jr. producer and mixer John Agnello explained that he attempted to achieve a "dry" sound on "Feel the Pain," saying, "That song is bone dry, except for a little plate reverb on the vocals. Because it is so dry, it jumps out more. I think you reap the benefits of sounding good on music television when you do that." The song opens with the sound of a cork being popped.

== Release ==
In addition to its release on Without a Sound, "Feel the Pain" was released as a single in 1994. The B-side was Without a Sound album track "Get Out of This." The song was a moderate hit for the band, reaching number 25 in the UK and number 4 on the Billboard Modern Rock Tracks.

"Feel the Pain" was accompanied by a music video that saw success on music television upon its release. The video, directed by Spike Jonze, featured Mascis and bassist Mike Johnson playing golf in the streets of New York City. Mascis later claimed the video was intended to be more violent but had been edited to be more MTV-friendly. J Mascis attributed the song's success to the song's video, explaining, "Right around when 'Feel the Pain' came out, it was on MTV, which was still happening then. If you had a video on, suddenly you were way bigger than you had been. So yeah, you could definitely tell. It was cool at the time. We weren't huge but we'd gotten a bit bigger."

== Reception and legacy ==
"Feel the Pain" has since seen positive reception from music critics. Matt Diehl of Rolling Stone wrote that the song "demonstrates how Dinosaur Jr at their best can make three chords played at deafening volume sound as stirring as Leonard Cohen." Despite criticizing Without a Sound as a whole, "Feel the Pain" was one of the two songs (the other being "I Don't Think So") that music critic Stephen Thomas Erlewine felt was a success. Mike Duffy of Fender called the song "an indie-pop dream" and "one of the era's essential anthems." Nick Soulsby of PopMatters wrote that the song "pulls the classic Mascis trick of effervescent guitar work that lures the listener in with promise of fun, only to be greeted with lyrics overwhelmed by regret and uncertainty." Timothy and Elizabeth Bracy of Stereogum called the song "infectious."

The song is featured in the films Houseguest and Young Adult. The song is a playable track in Rock Band 2 and Guitar Hero World Tour as well as a downloadable track for Rocksmith 2014. The video was later featured on Beavis and Butt-Head. The song was also featured in the second episode of Dexter: New Blood, "Storm of Fuck."

== Charts ==
Chart (1994)	Peak position
Australia (ARIA)	61
UK Singles (Official Charts)	25
US Radio Songs (Billboard)	62
US Alternative Airplay (Billboard)	4
