= Green Mind =

Studio album by Dinosaur Jr.
- Released: February 19, 1991
- Recorded: 1990–1991
- Genre: Alternative rock
- Length: 41:14
- Label: Blanco y Negro/Sire
- Producer: J Mascis

Dinosaur Jr. chronology
Bug (1988)	Green Mind (1991)	Fossils (1991)

Singles from Green Mind
- 1. "The Wagon" Released: 1990

Green Mind is the fourth studio album by alternative rock band Dinosaur Jr., released in 1991. It was the band's first release after bassist Lou Barlow's departure, as well as the first released by a major label. The record is close to being a J Mascis solo album: he played most of the instruments, with founding drummer Murph only featuring on three tracks (1, 7 and 9).

The cover photograph depicting a child smoking a cigarette, Priscilla, Jones Beach, 1969, is by Joseph Szabo and taken from his book of photographs Almost Grown.

"Turnip Farm" is also featured in the film Reality Bites.

== Critical reception ==
Professional ratings
Review scores
Source	Rating
AllMusic	4.5/5 stars
Chicago Tribune	4/4 stars
Christgau's Consumer Guide	B
The Philadelphia Inquirer	3.5/4 stars
Pitchfork	7.1/10
Q	4/5 stars
Rolling Stone	4/5 stars
Select	4/5
Sounds	4.5/5 stars
Uncut	8/10

In a contemporary review for Rolling Stone, Tom Sinclair said that compared to Dinosaur Jr.'s previous album Bug (1988), Green Mind "sounds every bit as energetic and full-blooded" despite much of the record being performed solely by Mascis, whose guitar playing, Sinclair remarked, "will bowl over even confirmed louder-is-better zealots." Chicago Tribune critic Greg Kot found that the album revealed Mascis to be "a craftsmanlike songwriter and arranger" with "one of rock's most unusual sensibilities—the bewildered couch potato". Ralph Traitor of Sounds declared that "Dinosaur Jr have given us two great sides of born innocent modern punk", while Graeme Kay commented in Q that Green Mind should "consolidate their reputation as purveyors of quality hardcore." Tom Moon, in The Philadelphia Inquirer, noted that, "while the solos include some brilliantly snarling episodes, it is the remarkably restrained rhythm parts that fully reveal Mascis' unorthodox approach."

Graham Linehan was more reserved in his praise, calling Green Mind "a relief, not a bolt from the sky" in his review for Select and finding that Dinosaur Jr. had yet to make a "masterpiece". In NME, Stuart Maconie deemed the album "under-done" at times but concluded that the band "remain a fascinating oddment in rock's haberdashery", playing "grunge with feeling and added cleverness." Robert Christgau considered Mascis more effective as an instrumentalist than as a vocalist.

Writing in retrospect for AllMusic, Fred Thomas opined that Green Mind "ushered in the version of Dinosaur Jr. that would live out the rest of the '90s, with Mascis' lyrical language of slang and vaguities hemming him into a lonely stoner figure and the warm-but-distant tone of the songwriting exposing an enormous debt to Neil Young for the first time in the band's catalog." Pitchfork's Jess Harvell observed that while "the music is just a step on from where Dino had arrived at on Bug ... throughout the album, Mascis' solos become more controlled bursts of classic rock, less spirals off the dirt track into the ditch of fuzz and mud." Stephen Deusner, reviewing for Uncut, noted that the "casual guitar jangle" of Green Mind emphasized the pop elements of Mascis's songwriting, while Drowned in Sound's Chris Power remarked on the "expansiveness" of Green Mind and its 1993 follow-up Where You Been.

== Track listing ==
All tracks are written by J Mascis, except where noted.

No.	Title	Length
1.	"The Wagon"	4:53
2.	"Puke + Cry"	4:27
3.	"Blowing It"	2:43
4.	"I Live for That Look"	1:56
5.	"Flying Cloud"	2:35
6.	"How'd You Pin That One on Me"	4:23
7.	"Water"	5:38
8.	"Muck"	4:15
9.	"Thumb"	5:38
10.	"Green Mind"	4:56
Total length:		41:14

Bonus tracks (2006 Re-release)
No.	Title	Writer(s)	Length
11.	"Hot Burrito #2" (Bonus track on 2006 re-release)	Chris Ethridge, Gram Parsons	3:22
12.	"Turnip Farm" (Bonus track on 2006 re-release)	J Mascis, Kurt Fedora	5:51
13.	"Forget It" (Bonus track on 2006 re-release)		4:07

B-sides & Singles (2019 2CD Deluxe Expanded Reissue)
No.	Title	Length
11.	"Pebbles + Weeds" (Bonus track on 2019 re-release)
12.	"The Little Baby" (Bonus track on 2019 re-release)
13.	"Not You Again" (Bonus track on 2019 re-release)
14.	"Quicksand (Wagon Reprise)" (Bonus track on 2019 re-release)
15.	"Throw Down" (Bonus track on 2019 re-release)
16.	"Whatever's Cool With Me" (Bonus track on 2019 re-release)
17.	"Sideways" (Bonus track on 2019 re-release)
18.	"The Wagon (7" DJ Edit)" (Bonus track on 2019 re-release)

CD 2: Live in Hollywood 1991 (2019 2CD Deluxe Expanded Reissue)
No.	Title	Length
19.	"The Lung" (Bonus track on 2019 re-release, previously unreleased. Live from Hollywood Palladium, June 14th, 1991.)
20.	"Water" (Bonus track on 2019 re-release, previously unreleased. Live from Hollywood Palladium, June 14th, 1991.)
21.	"The Wagon" (Bonus track on 2019 re-release, previously unreleased. Live from Hollywood Palladium, June 14th, 1991.)
22.	"Keep the Glove" (Bonus track on 2019 re-release, previously unreleased. Live from Hollywood Palladium, June 14th, 1991.)
23.	"Blowing It/I Live for That Look" (Bonus track on 2019 re-release, previously unreleased. Live from Hollywood Palladium, June 14th, 1991.)
24.	"Tarpit" (Bonus track on 2019 re-release, previously unreleased. Live from Hollywood Palladium, June 14th, 1991.)
25.	"Kracked" (Bonus track on 2019 re-release, previously unreleased. Live from Hollywood Palladium, June 14th, 1991.)
26.	"Freak Scene" (Bonus track on 2019 re-release, previously unreleased. Live from Hollywood Palladium, June 14th, 1991.)
27.	"Thumb" (Bonus track on 2019 re-release, previously unreleased. Live from Hollywood Palladium, June 14th, 1991.)
28.	"They Always Come" (Bonus track on 2019 re-release, previously unreleased. Live from Hollywood Palladium, June 14th, 1991.)
29.	"Budge" (Bonus track on 2019 re-release, previously unreleased. Live from Hollywood Palladium, June 14th, 1991.)
30.	"Sludgefeast" (Bonus track on 2019 re-release, previously unreleased. Live from Hollywood Palladium, June 14th, 1991.)
31.	"Thumb" (Live B-Side)
32.	"Keep the Glove" (Live B-Side)
33.	"The Lung" (Live B-Side)
34.	"The Post" (Live B-Side)

== Personnel ==
Dinosaur Jr.

- J Mascis - vocals, guitar, bass, drums, producer
- Murph - drums (tracks 1, 7, 9)

with:

- Joe Harvard - guitar, tape (track 8)
- Jay Spiegel - large drum, tambourine (track 5), tom-tom (track 1)
- Don Fleming - guitar, backing vocals (track 1), acoustic bass (track 5)
- Sean Slade - engineer, mellotron (tracks 7, 9)
- Tom Walters - assistant engineer
- Matt Dillon - backing vocals (track 11)

== Charts ==
Album - Billboard (United States)

Year	Chart	Position
1991	The Billboard 200	168

Singles - Billboard (United States)

Year	Single	Chart	Position
1991	"The Wagon"	Modern Rock Tracks	22
