= Bug (Dinosaur Jr. album) =

1988 studio album by Dinosaur Jr.

Studio album by Dinosaur Jr.
- Released: October 31, 1988
- Recorded: 1988
- Studio: Fort Apache in Cambridge, Massachusetts
- Genre: Alternative rock; indie rock; noise rock
- Length: 35:24
- Label: SST (216), Blast First, Au Go Go
- Producer: J Mascis

Dinosaur Jr. chronology
| You're Living All Over Me (1987) | Bug (1988) | Green Mind (1991) |

Singles from Bug
- 1. "Freak Scene" Released: 1988

Bug is the third studio album by the American alternative rock band Dinosaur Jr., released in October 1988 through SST Records. Blast First and Au Go Go Records released the album in the United Kingdom and Australia, respectively. It was the last Dinosaur Jr. album with original bassist Lou Barlow until Beyond in 2007.

Despite it being a favorite of many Dinosaur Jr. fans, J Mascis has said it is his least favorite Dinosaur Jr. album. The version of 'Keep The Glove' included on the 2005 reissue is not the same as the version on the b-side of the 'Freakscene' single or the compilation album Fossils (1991).

== Critical reception ==
Professional ratings
Review scores
| Source | Rating |
|---|---|
| AllMusic | 4.5/5 stars |
| Entertainment Weekly | A− |
| Mojo | 4/5 stars |
| NME | 8.999999/10 |
| Paste | 4.5/5 stars |
| Pitchfork | 7.3/10 |
| PopMatters | 8/10 |
| The Rolling Stone Album Guide | 2/5 stars |
| Spin Alternative Record Guide | 8/10 |
| Stylus Magazine | A |

Sample of "Freak Scene"

NME critic Jack Barron deemed Bug "the most comprehensive rock statement of the year so far" in a 1988 review for the magazine, noting Dinosaur Jr.'s predominantly "torpid" approach and commenting that the music "trepidates everyday reality away", while rating the album "8.999999" on a ten-point scale.

In a retrospective review of Bug for AllMusic, Stephen Thomas Erlewine described "Freak Scene" as the album's "masterpiece" and opined, "Although the majority of the album is firmly situated in the sprawling, noisy metallic fusion of hard rock and avant noise, Bug also demonstrates that J Mascis has a talent for winding folk-rock". While finding its songs "quite uneven", Erlewine concluded that the album nonetheless constitutes "a major step forward for Mascis".

Writing for Drowned in Sound in 2005, Mike Diver said of Bug, "The songwriting has increased tenfold since You're Living All Over Me ... really, if you like music – be it grunge, indie, punk, whatever – you will love this. Period. Go spend some money already." Keith Cameron of Mojo wrote, "Bug marks the emergence of Mascis writing by rote. When applied to such an outlandishly great song as 'Freak Scene' his skills still blazed, however, and as formulaic exercises in discordant alienation go, Bug is better than most."

Bug is included in the book 1001 Albums You Must Hear Before You Die. Beats Per Minute ranked it the 41st best album of the 1980s.

== Track listing ==
All tracks are written by J Mascis.

| No. | Title | Length |
|---|---|---|
| 1. | "Freak Scene" | 3:36 |
| 2. | "No Bones" | 3:43 |
| 3. | "They Always Come" | 4:37 |
| 4. | "Yeah We Know" | 5:24 |
| 5. | "Let It Ride" | 3:37 |
| 6. | "Pond Song" | 2:53 |
| 7. | "Budge" | 2:32 |
| 8. | "The Post" | 3:38 |
| 9. | "Don't" | 5:41 |
| Total length: | | 35:24 |

Bonus track
| No. | Title | Length |
|---|---|---|
| 10. | "Keep the Glove" (Bonus track on 2005 Merge Records reissue) | 2:52 |

== Personnel ==
Dinosaur Jr.

- J Mascis – vocals, guitar
- Lou Barlow – bass, vocals on "Don't"
- Murph – drums

Additional personnel

- Sean Slade – engineering
- Paul Q. Kolderie – engineering
- Maura Jasper – cover art
