= Hand It Over =

Album by Dinosaur Jr.

Studio album by Dinosaur Jr.
- Released: March 25, 1997
- Genre: Alternative rock; hard rock
- Length: 48:08
- Label: Blanco y Negro; Reprise
- Producer: J Mascis

Dinosaur Jr. chronology
Without a Sound (1994)	Hand It Over (1997)	Beyond (2007)

Professional ratings
Review scores
Source	Rating
AllMusic	4/5 stars
Chicago Tribune	2/4 stars
Christgau's Consumer Guide	(dud)
The Encyclopedia of Popular Music	3/5 stars
Entertainment Weekly	C+
Los Angeles Times	3/4 stars
The New Rolling Stone Album Guide	3/5 stars
Rolling Stone	3.5/5 stars
NME	7/10

Hand It Over is the seventh studio album by alternative rock band Dinosaur Jr., released on March 25, 1997, on Reprise Records. It peaked at No. 188 in the United States. According to a 2007 Magnet interview with band leader J Mascis, Hand It Over is his favorite album from the group's major label period of the 1990s.

The band enjoyed a somewhat renewed appreciation from critics on Hand It Over. However, in the years following the band's hiatus, Hand It Over would become hard to find due to it not having the same success in sales as the band's prior two albums, Where You Been and Without a Sound, which both sported moderate radio hits in the US. Hand It Over ultimately sold 34,000 units in the US.

"Take a Run at the Sun" was released as a single to promote the album; however, it was initially only included on the European and Australian versions of the album. The single peaked at No. 53 on the UK Singles Chart and at No. 2 on the UK Rock & Metal Singles Chart.

== Track listing ==
All tracks are written by J Mascis.

No.	Title	Length
1.	"I Don't Think"	3:21
2.	"Never Bought It"	3:42
3.	"Nothin's Goin On"	3:13
4.	"I'm Insane"	3:53
5.	"Can't We Move This"	3:41
6.	"Alone"	8:01
7.	"Sure Not Over You"	4:09
8.	"Loaded"	3:27
9.	"Mick"	4:39
10.	"I Know Yer Insane"	3:03
11.	"Gettin Rough"	2:12
12.	"Gotta Know"	4:47
Total length:		48:08

Bonus Tracks (2019 2CD Deluxe Expanded Reissue) Disc 1
No.	Title	Length
13.	"Take a Run at the Sun" (Previously released on the Take a Run at the Sun EP)	3:21
14.	"Don't You Think It's Time" (Previously released on the Take a Run at the Sun EP)	3:42
15.	"The Pickle Song" (Previously released on the Take a Run at the Sun EP)	3:13
16.	"I Misunderstood" (Bonus track on 2019 re-release, disc 1.)
17.	"What We Do Is Secret" (Bonus track on 2019 re-release, disc 1.)
18.	"Never Bought It" (Bonus track on 2019 re-release, disc 1. Live on ABC. Previously unreleased.)
19.	"Sure Not Over You" (Bonus track on 2019 re-release, disc 1. Live on ABC. Previously unreleased.)

Live in Stockholm, 1997
No.	Title	Length
1.	"Out There" (Bonus track on 2019 re-release, disc 2. Live from Stockholm Water Festival, August 13th, 1997. Previously unreleased.)
2.	"Never Bought It" (Bonus track on 2019 re-release, disc 2. Live from Stockholm Water Festival, August 13th, 1997. Previously unreleased.)
3.	"Repulsion" (Bonus track on 2019 re-release, disc 2. Live from Stockholm Water Festival, August 13th, 1997. Previously unreleased.)
4.	"Feel The Pain" (Bonus track on 2019 re-release, disc 2. Live from Stockholm Water Festival, August 13th, 1997. Previously unreleased.)
5.	"Get Me" (Bonus track on 2019 re-release, disc 2. Live from Stockholm Water Festival, August 13th, 1997. Previously unreleased.)
6.	"Freak Scene" (Bonus track on 2019 re-release, disc 2. Live from Stockholm Water Festival, August 13th, 1997. Previously unreleased.)
7.	"Sludgefeast" (Bonus track on 2019 re-release, disc 2. Live from Stockholm Water Festival, August 13th, 1997. Previously unreleased.)
8.	"Alone" (Bonus track on 2019 re-release, disc 2.Live from Stockholm Water Festival, August 13th, 1997. Previously unreleased.)
9.	"What Else Is New" (Bonus track on 2019 re-release, disc 2. Live from Stockholm Water Festival, August 13th, 1997. Previously unreleased.)

== Personnel ==
- J Mascis – lead vocals, guitars, drums, percussion, keyboards, production
- Mike Johnson – bass
- Maura Jasper – artwork
- John Yates – sound engineer
- Andy Wilkinson – sound engineer
- Brian Paulson – sound engineer
- Dan McLoughlin – sound engineer
- Greg Calbi – mastering
- John Agnello – mixing
- Brian Sperber – mixing (assistant)
- Philip Reichenheim (Inlay Photographs) – photography
- Kevin Shields – record producer, vocals (track 1, 2)
- Bilinda Butcher – vocals (track 1)
- Tiffany Anders – vocals (track 2, 4)
- Varsh Farazdel – vocals (track 10)
- Kurt Fedora – bass (track 6)
- Dan Mclughlin – keyboards (track 7)
- George Berz – drums, percussion (track 10)
- Donna Gauger – trumpet
  - Recorded at Bob's Place, Bearsville Barn and MBV Studio.
  - Mixed at Electric Lady Studios
  - Mastered at Masterdisk
