= Dinosaur (Dinosaur Jr. album) =

Studio album by Dinosaur Jr.
- Released: 1985
- Recorded: "At Chris Dixon's house"
- Genre: Alternative rock; indie rock; cowpunk
- Length: 40:25
- Label: Homestead
- Producer: Dinosaur Jr.

Dinosaur Jr. chronology
Dinosaur (1985)	You're Living All Over Me (1987)

Singles from Dinosaur
- 1. "Repulsion" Released: 1985

Dinosaur is the debut album by the American alternative rock band Dinosaur Jr. It was released in 1985 on Homestead Records. The album exhibits a folkier side of the band than on future releases, but some of the tracks on the album showed off a much heavier, more hardcore punk-based side to the band in songs such as "Does it Float", "Mountain Man" and "Bulbs of Passion".

== Background and recording ==
After the break-up of his hardcore punk band Deep Wound in 1984, J. Mascis wrote a number of songs by himself and showed them to bandmate Lou Barlow and invited him to play bass in a new band. Homestead Records impresario Gerard Cosloy promised Mascis that if he were to make a record, Homestead would release it. Mascis enlisted vocalist Charlie Nakajima, also formerly of Deep Wound, and drummer Emmett Patrick Murphy (otherwise known as Murph) to complete the band. Mascis explained the concept behind the group as "ear-bleeding country". After a gig at U Mass Amherst, Mascis fired Nakajima and took Cosloy up on his offer to release an album on Homestead. Dinosaur recorded their debut album for $500 at a home studio in the woods outside Northampton, Massachusetts. Mascis wrote all of the songs and sang most of the lead vocals.

The album was originally released when the band was still known simply as Dinosaur, before a lawsuit forced the name change to Dinosaur Jr. Therefore, it was originally a self-titled album, but subsequent issues kept the Dinosaur title.

== Release and reception ==
Professional ratings
Review scores
Source	Rating
AllMusic	3/5 stars
Entertainment Weekly	B
Pitchfork Media	6.2/10

When Dinosaur was released in July of 1985, critical indifference led to low sales; only about 1,500 copies were sold in its first year.

Critical reception of the album has since been mixed. In a retrospective review, AllMusic's Stephen Thomas Erlewine described Dinosaur as "impressive" and said it had several standout songs. However, he said the album was overall "uneven" due to the band's apparent struggle to successfully integrate hardcore punk and hard rock with touches of experimental music. Pitchfork Media described it as "a fucking mess" with overly lengthy tracks drawing on too many styles to be consistent.

== Track listing ==
All tracks are written by J Mascis.

No.	Title	Length
1.	"Forget the Swan"	5:09
2.	"Cats in a Bowl"	3:35
3.	"The Leper"	4:04
4.	"Does It Float"	3:18
5.	"Pointless"	2:46
6.	"Repulsion"	3:04
7.	"Gargoyle"	2:11
8.	"Severed Lips"	4:02
9.	"Mountain Man"	3:28
10.	"Quest"	4:27
11.	"Bulbs of Passion"	4:13
Total length:		40:25

Note: "Bulbs of Passion" was not featured on the original vinyl LP; it was a B-side to the "Repulsion" single. Subsequent reissues on cassette and compact disc featured it as the last song. The 2005 reissue on Merge Records placed "Bulbs of Passion" as the first track at J Mascis' request. "Yeah, I asked for that," J recalls, "because [that song] gave our new direction - it felt like we were our own sound." Also featured was a 1987 live performance of "Does It Float" as a bonus track to close out the album.

== Personnel ==
Dinosaur Jr.

- J Mascis - vocals, guitar, tom tom, cymbal, big muff
- Lou Barlow - bass, vocals, synthesizer (credited as casio)
- Murph - drums, vocals on "Mountain Man", synthesizer (credited as casio)

Additional Personnel

- Chris Dixon and Glen - engineering
- Jason Talerman - photography
- Maura Jasper - cover art
- Lou Barlow - back cover art
