= Dinosaur Jr. =

American rock band

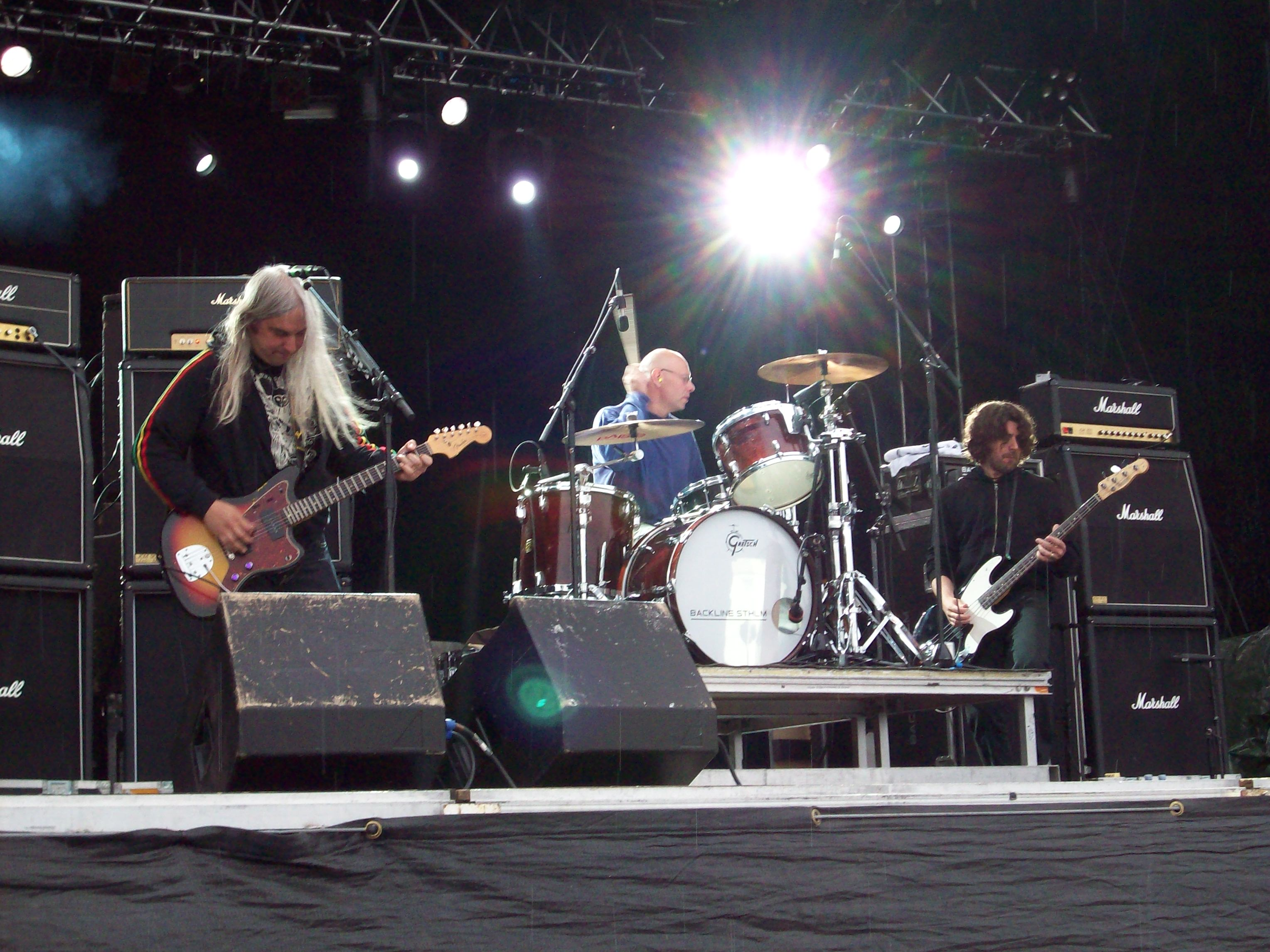
- Dinosaur Jr. performing in Stockholm, Sweden, in June 2008 (Left to right: J Mascis, Murph, Lou Barlow)

Background information
- Also known as: Dinosaur (1984–1987)
- Origin: Amherst, Massachusetts, U.S.
- Genres: Alternative rock; indie rock; noise rock; hardcore punk (early)
- Works: Discography
- Years active: 1984–1997; 2005–present
- Labels: Joyful Noise Recordings; Homestead; SST; Blanco y Negro/Sire; Merge; Fat Possum; PIAS Recordings; Jagjaguwar; Blast First; Au Go Go; Cherry Red
- Spinoffs: Sebadoh; J Mascis + The Fog; Witch; Folk Implosion
- Spinoff of: Deep Wound, Mogo
- Members: J Mascis; Murph; Lou Barlow
- Past members: Mike Johnson
- Website: dinosaurjr.com

Dinosaur Jr. is an American rock band formed in Amherst, Massachusetts, in 1984. The band was founded by J Mascis (guitar, vocals, primary songwriter), Lou Barlow (bass, vocals), and Murph (drums). After three albums on independent labels, the band earned a reputation as one of the formative influences on American alternative rock. Creative tension led to Mascis firing Barlow, who later formed Sebadoh and Folk Implosion. His replacement, Mike Johnson, came aboard for three major-label albums. Murph eventually quit, with Mascis taking over drums on the band's albums before the group disbanded in 1997. The original lineup reformed in 2005, releasing six albums thereafter.

Mascis's drawling vocals and distinct guitar sound, harking back to 1960s and 1970s classic rock and characterized by extensive use of feedback and distortion, were highly influential in the alternative rock movement of the 1990s.

== History ==
=== 1984: Formation ===
Mascis and Barlow played together, on drums and guitar respectively, in the hardcore punk band Deep Wound, formed in 1982 while the pair were attending high school in western Massachusetts. After high school, they began exploring slower yet still aggressive music like Black Sabbath, the Replacements, and Neil Young. Mascis's college friend Gerard Cosloy introduced him to psychedelic-influenced pop bands like Dream Syndicate, which Mascis in turn showed to Barlow. Barlow explained, "We loved speed metal ... and we loved wimpy-jangly stuff".

Deep Wound broke up in mid-1984. Cosloy had dropped out of the University of Massachusetts Amherst to focus on running his independent record label, Homestead Records. He promised Mascis that if he were to make a record, Homestead would release it. Mascis wrote a number of songs by himself and showed them to Barlow, to whom he offered the bassist position. Barlow described the songs as "... fucking brilliant ... They were so far beyond. I was still into two-chord songs and basic stuff like 'I'm so sad.' While I was really into my own little tragedy, J was operating in this whole other panorama." Mascis enlisted vocalist Charlie Nakajima, also formerly of Deep Wound, and drummer Emmett Patrick Murphy (otherwise known as Murph) to complete the band. Mascis explained the concept behind the group as "ear-bleeding country".

The band was initially named Mogo, and they played their first show on the University of Massachusetts Amherst campus in the first week of September 1984. However, Nakajima used the performance to launch an extended anti-police tirade. Mascis was so appalled by Nakajima's behavior at the show that he disbanded the group the next day. A few days later, Mascis invited Barlow and Murph to form a new band without telling Nakajima. "I was kind of like too wimpy to kick him out, exactly," Mascis later admitted. "Communicating with people has been a constant problem in the band." The trio named themselves Dinosaur, and Mascis and Barlow took over shared lead vocal duties.

=== 1985–1986: Dinosaur ===
Dinosaur began playing gigs all over Amherst. Their extremely loud live performances often alienated audience members and angered venue owners. The band quickly found themselves banned from all but one venue in town for playing too loud. This forced them to play frequent out of town shows, and early gigs at such venues as New York's CBGB and Boston's the Channel would give Dinosaur a much needed boost. A gig opening for Big Black at Maxwell's in Hoboken led to the band meeting Sonic Youth.

Mascis took Cosloy up on his offer to release an album on Homestead, and Dinosaur recorded their debut album for $500 at a home studio in the woods outside Northampton, Massachusetts. Their debut album Dinosaur was released in 1985, for which Mascis wrote all of the songs. Mascis sang his vocal parts in his trademark nasal drawl, which was often compared to singer Neil Young. With Mascis not yet feeling comfortable with the lead vocalist role, many songs featured lead vocals by Barlow.Mascis would sing most or all of the lead vocals on all of their subsequent releases. The album did not make much of an impact commercially or critically. It sold only about 1,500 copies in its first year and was largely ignored by the majority of the music press.

Though originally unimpressed by the first Dinosaur performance they saw, Sonic Youth approached the band after watching them play several months later, declaring themselves fans. Sonic Youth invited Dinosaur to join them on tour in the American Northeast and northern Midwest in September 1986.

=== 1987: You're Living All Over Me and name change ===
Dinosaur recorded much of their second album, You're Living All Over Me, with Sonic Youth engineer Wharton Tiers in New York. Tensions emerged during the recording process between Mascis and Murph due to Mascis' very specific ideas for the drum parts. Barlow recalled, "J controlled Murph's every drumbeat ... And Murph could not handle that. Murph wanted to kill J for the longest time." Gerard Cosloy was excited by the completed album, but was devastated when Mascis told him the band was going to release it on California-based SST Records. Mascis was reluctant to sign a two-album deal with Homestead, which Cosloy felt betrayed by, "There was no way I couldn't take it personally." After the album's completion, Mascis moved to New York, leaving the rest of the band feeling alienated.

You're Living All Over Me was released in 1987; early copies of the record in the Boston area were packaged with the Weed Forestin' tape, the first release by Barlow's side project Sebadoh. The album received much more attention in the indie-rock community than the debut. Barlow also composed two songs: the hardcore-influenced "Lose" and an acoustic song entitled "Poledo" that anticipated his work with Sebadoh.

Immediately following the release of You're Living All Over Me, a supergroup called Dinosaurs (featuring ex-members of Country Joe and the Fish, Quicksilver Messenger Service, Hot Tuna, the Grateful Dead, and Jefferson Airplane) sued Dinosaur over the use of the name, prompting the addition of "Jr."

=== 1988–1990: Bug and Barlow's departure ===
Dinosaur Jr. had a significant breakthrough in the United Kingdom with their debut single for Blast First, "Freak Scene", in 1988. A version with censored lyrics was issued for radio use, reaching number 4 in the UK independent chart. It stayed on the chart for 12 weeks. The band's third album, Bug, followed shortly afterwards, reaching number 1 on the UK independent chart and spending 38 weeks on the chart. The band's first UK singles chart placing came in 1989 with their cover of the Cure's "Just Like Heaven".

Bug was similar in musical style to You're Living All Over Me, with contrasting distorted instruments and the melodic vocals, as was the band's unique blend of musical influences. However, Bug was considered to be more melodic, accompanied by more conventional song structures. Barlow's only lead vocal was on the album's final track, featuring an overdriven, noise-rock backing track and Barlow screaming "Why don't you like me?" Mascis took lead vocals on all the other tracks and exhibited even tighter control over the band's sound, composing the parts for Murph and Barlow to play. Yet, he has described Bug as his least favorite of the band's albums, saying in a 2005 interview, "I like some of the songs but, I dunno, I guess I really don't like the vibe of it."

Despite the album's success, tension between Mascis and Barlow began interfering with the band's productivity. In 1989, after touring in support of Bug, Barlow was kicked out of the band. Barlow focused his attention on his former side-project Sebadoh. "The Freed Pig", the opening track on 1991's Sebadoh III, documents Barlow's frustration with Mascis and feeling of being treated poorly in Dinosaur Jr.

Meanwhile, the band embarked on an Australian tour with Donna Dresch filling in for Barlow. In 1990, the band released a new single,"The Wagon", on Sub Pop, their first release since Barlow's departure. The single featured a short-lived lineup including guitarist Don Fleming and drummer Jay Spiegel from the band Gumball, in addition to Mascis and Murph.

=== 1990–1997: Major label years and break-up ===
Despite the ongoing turmoil in their lineup, Dinosaur Jr. signed with Sire Records in 1990, and made their major-label debut with Green Mind in 1991. This record heavily featured Mascis, with Murph playing drums on only a few songs, as well as minimal contributions from Fleming and Spiegel, who were out of the band by the time the album was released. Mascis recorded many of the drum parts by himself and layered the various instrumental parts through overdubbing.

For touring purposes, Mascis first added Van Conner, and then Mike Johnson on bass. Together they embarked on several tours to support Green Mind, with support acts that included Nirvana. In 1991, Sire Records released an EP titled Whatever's Cool with Me that featured old B-sides coupled with one new track. In 1992, the band was part of the Rollercoaster Tour, a package tour based on the successful Lollapolooza festival, which featured the Jesus and Mary Chain, My Bloody Valentine, and Blur.

The band found their live shows well received in the changing musical climate of the early 1990s and decided to record new material with the new lineup. This time, the recording sessions included full participation from Murph and Johnson, with the former playing most of the drums and the latter playing all of the bass parts, singing harmony vocals, and even contributing a few guitar solos. This material represented the peak of the band's commercial success, with the single Start Choppin' reaching the top 20 in the UK, and the album that followed, Where You Been, reaching the UK top 10 and the US top 50. The opening track, "Out There", had an accompanying video and was aired on MTV for a short time on the show 120 Minutes. Although their new material was more accessible than the band's 1980s albums, in terms of playing, it represented a partial return to the more unrestrained power-trio sound of the original lineup.

Murph left the band after touring for Where You Been and was replaced for the band's live shows by George Berz, leaving Mascis as the sole remaining original member. However, the band's subsequent albums would be recorded mostly by Mascis on his own, playing everything except for the bass and some of the harmony vocals, which continued to be handled by Mike Johnson. The commercial success continued with 1994's Without a Sound, which placed well in both the US and UK album charts. Without a Sound notably contained the lead single "Feel the Pain", which became the band's highest-charting single (No. 4 on the Alternative Airplay chart and No. 25 on the UK Singles chart). 1997's Hand It Over suffered from a lack of promotion by the band's label, as Mascis claimed that the album did not contain a "hit single" (although "Take a Run at the Sun", which only appeared on certain editions of the album, peaked at No. 53 on the UK Singles chart). Due to the lack of promotion and a low turnout during their 1997 tour, Mascis finally retired the Dinosaur Jr. name, with the group's final live performance being an appearance on the American talk show The Jenny Jones Show. In 2000, Mascis released the first of two solo albums under the name J Mascis + The Fog.

=== 2005–2011: Reunion, Beyond and Farm ===
Mascis and Barlow began to reconcile when Mascis began showing up at Sebadoh shows. "I think he was kind of aware of how much shit I was talking about him," Barlow noted in a 2005 interview, "but I don't think he really ever pursued any of it. One of the things that really triggered this, for me to finally just go, 'Hey, you know, maybe this could work,' is when I realized that maybe J wasn't really holding any kind of grudge against me because he didn't like me. I was thinking, maybe he just didn't realize what he had done, or maybe he wasn't really aware of how much he'd actually hurt me. And when I started to realize that, he kind of became more human to me."

In 2002, the two shared the stage for two shows in London, with Barlow singing "I Wanna Be Your Dog" along with Mascis, Ron Asheton, Scott Asheton and Mike Watt, who had been performing Stooges songs as "Asheton, Asheton, Mascis and Watt".

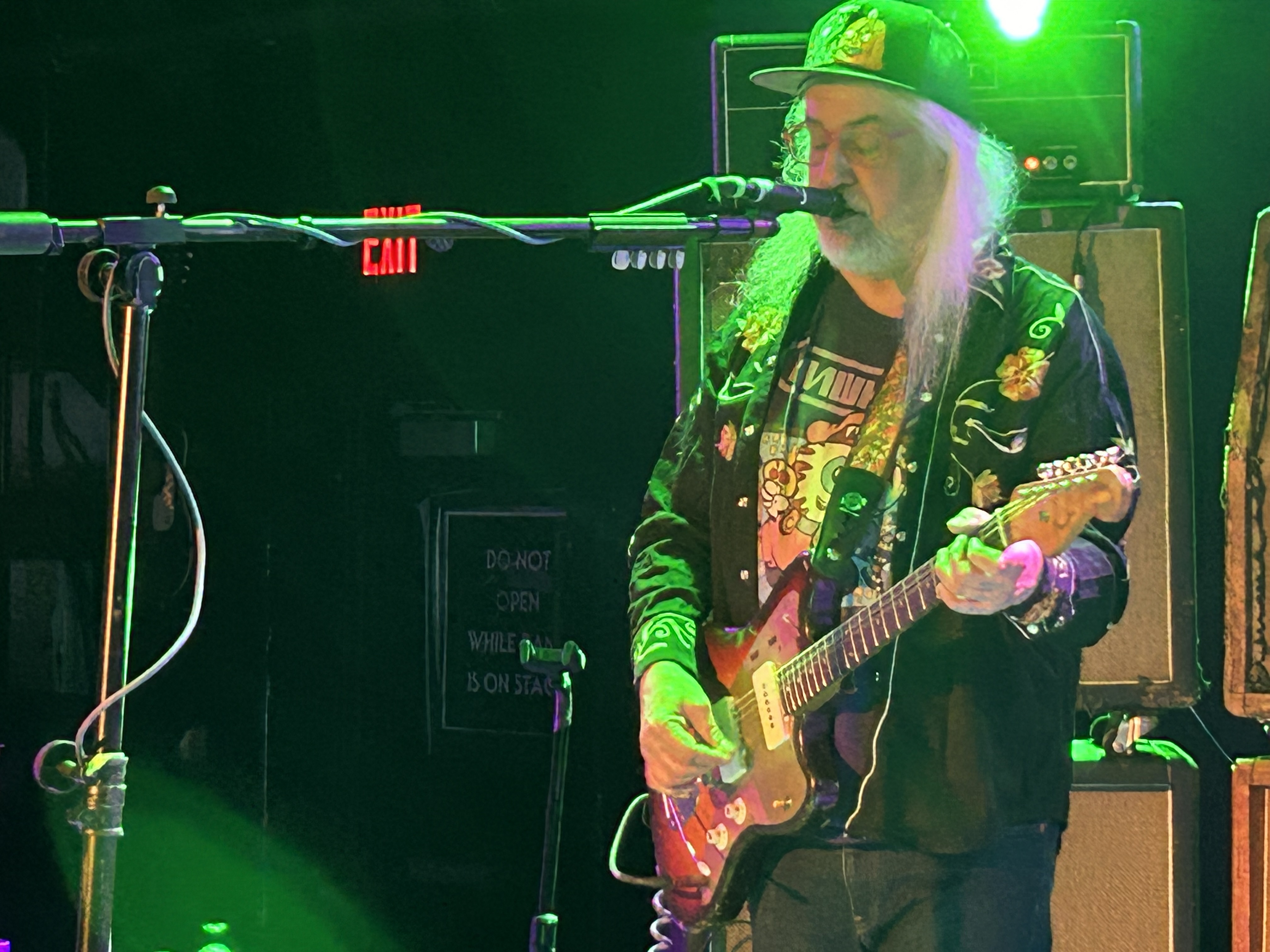
J Mascis performs with Dinosaur Jr. at The Stone Pony in Asbury Park, NJ on January 24, 2024.

Mascis regained the master rights to the band's first three albums from SST in 2004 and arranged for their reissue on Merge in early 2005. Later that year, he and Barlow shared the stage at a benefit show for autism at Smith College in Northampton, Massachusetts organized by Barlow's mother, and played together as Deep Wound after Mascis and Sebadoh had completed their respective sets.

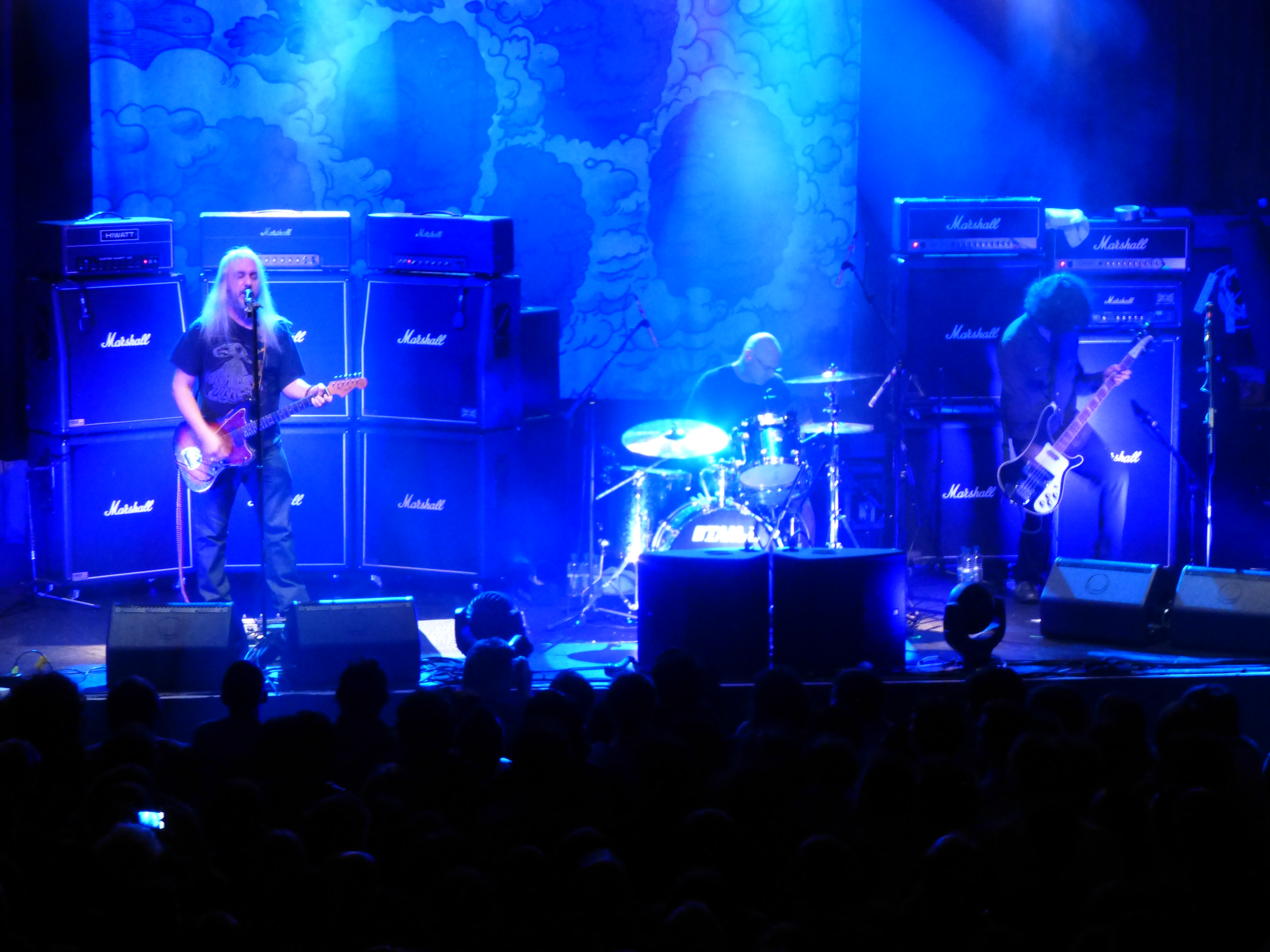
Dinosaur Jr. on stage at the Manchester Ritz during the I Bet on Sky tour, February 1, 2013

Following the reissues in 2005, Mascis, Barlow, and Murph finally reunited to play on The Late Late Show with Craig Ferguson on April 15, 2005. In June that year, they kicked off a tour of Europe. While performing in New York City in 2006, much of the band's equipment was stolen while stored outside their hotel. The band members were later among the curators of 2006's All Tomorrow's Parties festival.

In 2007, the original members of Dinosaur Jr. released Beyond on Fat Possum Records, their first album of new material as a trio since Bug in 1988. It was met with critical acclaim, receiving an 8.4 rating from Pitchfork Media and garnering positive reviews from the music press as a whole. It was considered somewhat of a sonic paradox in that even though it featured the original members who produced "two records so drenched in noise they still sound like aural assaults decades after their original release," sonically it resembled the major label releases of the 1990s in both production values and stylistic range. On the other hand, while the sound was not as extreme as the original lineup's 1980s albums, it did feature a bigger, more unrestrained, and more live-sounding feel than their 1990s albums, though Barlow's bass was noticeably quieter. Barlow made his mark on the music in other ways; for the first time since You're Living All Over Me, he contributed to the songwriting. The album went on to have good commercial success, debuting on the Billboard 200 at number 69 its opening week.

In February 2009, the band signed with indie label Jagjaguwar. The band's first release on the new label was an album titled Farm which was released on June 23, 2009. Murph said the album was recorded at Mascis's home and marked a return to the heavier, Where You Been LP era. The album reached number 29 on the Billboard 200, making it the band's highest-charting album in the US. To promote the album, the band played Farm's lead-off track, "Pieces", on Late Night with Jimmy Fallon on June 25, 2009.

=== 2012–2025: I Bet on Sky, Give a Glimpse of What Yer Not and Sweep It Into Space ===
Dinosaur Jr. released their second album for Jagjaguwar, I Bet on Sky, in September 2012, to favourable reviews. In December 2015, Murph confirmed the band had entered the studio to begin working on their follow up to I Bet on Sky. The album Give a Glimpse of What Yer Not was released on August 5, 2016, on Jagjaguwar. In February 2019, the song "Over Your Shoulder" from the band's 1994 album Without a Sound reached number 18 on Japan's Billboard charts. The cause is suspected to be the song's use on the Japanese TV show called Gachinko Fight Club.

In February 2021, the band announced their 12th album Sweep It Into Space, which was released on April 23, 2021. The album was originally scheduled for release in mid-2020 but was delayed due to the COVID-19 pandemic. The album was preceded by the single "I Ran Away" on February 23, 2021, with a music video for the song being released on March 3, 2021. The second single, "Garden", was released with a music video on March 31, 2021. The band announced a 2021 North American tour to support the album was planned to begin in September 2021 and would conclude in February 2022. In 2024, the band, along with The Flaming Lips, served as the opening act for Weezer during their Voyage to the Blue Planet concert tour. Dinosaur Jr. announced a 2025 American summer tour with Snail Mail.

=== 2026–present: There Near ===
In June 2026, Dinosaur Jr. announced their thirteenth studio album, There Near, scheduled for release on August 28, 2026, through Jagjaguwar. The announcement was accompanied by the lead single "Several Got Away".

== Musical style and influences ==
Dinosaur Jr. has been categorized as alternative rock indie rock, slacker rock, noise rock, hardcore punk (early albums) and grunge (early 1990s).

"Freak Scene"
Sample of "Freak Scene" from the band's third album Bug (1988), a song that features Mascis's distinctive "slacker" vocal drawl and a layered guitar sound.

The band's musical style differed from its underground contemporaries in several ways, which included the influence of classic rock on the band's music, their use of feedback, extreme volume as well as loud-quiet dynamic, combined with Mascis's droning vocals. Music critic Byron Coley described the sound as an "orgone cloud of noise-terror."

Gerald Cosloy, head of Homestead Records, summarized the band's music: "It was its own bizarre hybrid. ... It wasn't exactly pop, it wasn't exactly punk rock—it was completely its own thing".

Lou Barlow has described the Phoenix, Arizona band Meat Puppets as "the singularly most influential band on both Dinosaur Jr. and Sebadoh." The band has also highlighted the influence of Neil Young, Black Sabbath, the Birthday Party, Scratch Acid, Sonic Youth, Green on Red, the Dream Syndicate, and Throbbing Gristle.

The band's sound has been described as "combining an insouciant cool with explosions of pure guitar noise." Mascis listened to classic rock artists such as the Rolling Stones and the Beach Boys, elements of which were incorporated into Dinosaur Jr.'s sound. In addition, Mascis was also a fan of many punk and hardcore bands such as the Birthday Party, and has frequently noted Nick Cave as an influence. Dinosaur Jr. combined elements of hardcore punk and noise rock into their songs, which often featured a large amount of feedback, distortion and extreme volume. When the master tape of You're Living All Over Me arrived at SST, the label's production manager noticed the level on the tape was so high it was distorting; however, Mascis confirmed it was the way he wanted the album to sound.

Similar to Mascis's guitar work, Barlow's bass lines with their alternating heavily distorted, fast chords and pulverizing lows, draw heavily from both his hardcore past and musicians such as Lemmy and Johnny Ramone. On his influences, Barlow stated that "...Johnny Ramone is my hero. I wanted to make that rhythmic chugging sound like he got playing guitar with the Ramones. And, I found that I got a bigger sound by strumming farther up the neck."

Mascis's vocals are another distinctive feature of Dinosaur Jr.'s music. A characteristic of Mascis's vocal style is frequent use of vocal fry. He attributed his "whiny low-key drawl", the opposite of the hardcore punk "bark", to artists such as John Fogerty and Mick Jagger. His style also resembled Neil Young's, but Mascis disputed this and later commented: "That got annoying, being compared all the time." His drawl epitomized the band's slacker ethos and relaxed attitude; author Michael Azerrad said "even Mascis seemed removed from the feelings he was conveying in the music."

== Legacy ==
Stephen Thomas Erlewine of AllMusic conferred the title of "one of the most distinctive, influential alternative bands of the '80s" on Dinosaur Jr. He also said, "Dinosaur Jr. were largely responsible for returning lead guitar to indie rock and, along with their peers the Pixies, they injected late-'80s alternative rock with monumental levels of pure guitar noise." In a BBC review of their reissued albums You're Living All Over Me and Bug, Zoe Street called them "Frighteningly ahead of their time." The Seattle Times called them "one of post-punk's most influential bands."

Dinosaur Jr.'s music has influenced many other musicians such as Kurt Cobain of Nirvana, Billy Corgan of the Smashing Pumpkins, Radiohead, Slowdive, Mudhoney, Tad, Superchunk, Doug Martsch of Built to Spill, Kevin Shields of My Bloody Valentine, Ride, Aidan Moffat of Arab Strap, Swervedriver, Uncle Tupelo, Evan Dando of the Lemonheads, Tom DeLonge of Blink-182, Band of Horses, and Kurt Vile.

Their album You're Living All Over Me has been called "the first perfect indie rock album." Spin named it one of "The 300 Best Albums of the Past 30 Years (1985–2014)". Pitchfork placed the album at number 40 on its Top 100 Albums of the 1980s list in 2002.

== Band members ==
Current members

- J Mascis – lead vocals, guitar, keyboards, occasional bass, percussion (1984–1997, 2005–present), drums (1993–1997; in-studio only)
- Murph – drums, occasional keyboards and vocals (1984–1993, 2005–present)
- Lou Barlow – bass, backing and occasional lead vocals, ukulele, tape loops, occasional guitar and synthesizer (1984–1989, 2005–present)

Former members

- Mike Johnson – bass, backing vocals (1991–1997)

Former touring musicians

- Donna Dresch – bass, backing vocals (1990)
- Van Conner – bass, backing vocals (1990–1991)
- George Berz – drums (1993–1997)

Timeline

== Discography ==
- Dinosaur (1985)
- You're Living All over Me (1987)
- Bug (1988)
- Green Mind (1991)
- Where You Been (1993)
- Without a Sound (1994)
- Hand It Over (1997)
- Beyond (2007)
- Farm (2009)
- I Bet on Sky (2012)
- Give a Glimpse of What Yer Not (2016)
- Sweep It Into Space (2021)
- There Near (2026)

== Filmography ==
- Freakscene – The Story of Dinosaur Jr. (2022)
