= Freak Scene =

Single by Dinosaur Jr.

from the album Bug
- B-side: "Keep the Glove"
- Released: September 1988
- Recorded: 1988 at Fort Apache North
- Genre: Indie rock; alternative rock; noise pop
- Length: 3:35
- Label: SST (220)
- Songwriter(s): J Mascis
- Producer(s): J Mascis

Dinosaur Jr. singles chronology
"Little Fury Things" (1987)	"Freak Scene" (1988)	"Just Like Heaven" (1989)

"Freak Scene" is a song by American alternative rock band Dinosaur Jr., the opening track on the group's third studio album Bug (1988). Written and produced by frontman J Mascis, the song was recorded at Fort Apache Studios by engineers Paul Q. Kolderie and Sean Slade. "Freak Scene" was released as a single on SST Records in the United States and was also Dinosaur Jr.'s first release on Blast First in the United Kingdom. The band also made a music video to promote the single.

== Content ==
Music journalist Everett True writes that "Freak Scene" "invented the slacker generation. J. plays the guitar like he skis: effortlessly and fully in control. The song slows down, catches on fire, whispers sweet harmony and then starts blowing a tornado. 'So fucked ...you'd see it,' J. sings with heavy resignation ... 'Don't let me fuck up will you?' J. pleads, helpless in his slumber. 'Because when I need a friend, it's still you.'"

== Reception ==
"Freak Scene" is rated as one of the best songs by Dinosaur Jr. In his review of Bug, Stephen Thomas Erlewine of Allmusic called the track "the masterpiece of the record, . . . a surprisingly catchy song encapsulating the appeal and pitfalls of indie rock within three minutes." Jess Harvell of Pitchfork believes "'Freak Scene' is probably indie rock's greatest guitar performance and the band's greatest pop song, somehow finding room for Psychedelic Furs jangle, Edge-style ascending harmonies, Eddie Van Halen in the drunk tank, pickled country, and a cherry on top in three and a half minutes without feeling at all cluttered." The single reached number seven in the UK Indie Chart, and spent 12 weeks on the chart in total.

== Covers ==
"Freak Scene" would eventually be covered by pop-punk band Blink-182 on their debut demo Flyswatter. Belle & Sebastian would also cover the track live.

== Accolades ==
"Freak Scene" has been ranked the number 1 song in the 'All Time Indie Top 50'.

"Freak Scene"
Sample of "Freak Scene", featuring Mascis' distinctive "slacker" vocal drawl and a layered guitar sound.

The track also received the following accolades over the years:

Publication	Country	Accolade	Rank
Toby Creswell	Australia	1001 Songs	*
Beats Per Minute	US	The Top 100 Tracks of the 1980s	81
Blender	US	500 Greatest Songs From 1980-2005	407
Pitchfork	US	The 200 Best Songs of the 1980s	74
Robert Dimery	US	1001 Songs You Must Hear Before You Die	*
NME	UK	The 500 Greatest Songs Of All Time	153
Q	UK	40 Best Tracks Of The 1980s	35
Uncut	UK	The 100 Greatest Singles Of The Post-Punk Era	13
Rockdelux	Spain	The Top 100 Songs from 1984-1993	5

* denotes an unordered list.

== Track listing ==
Both songs written by J Mascis.

1. "Freak Scene" – 3:35
2. "Keep the Glove" – 2:52
