= Lou Barlow =

American musician (born 1966)

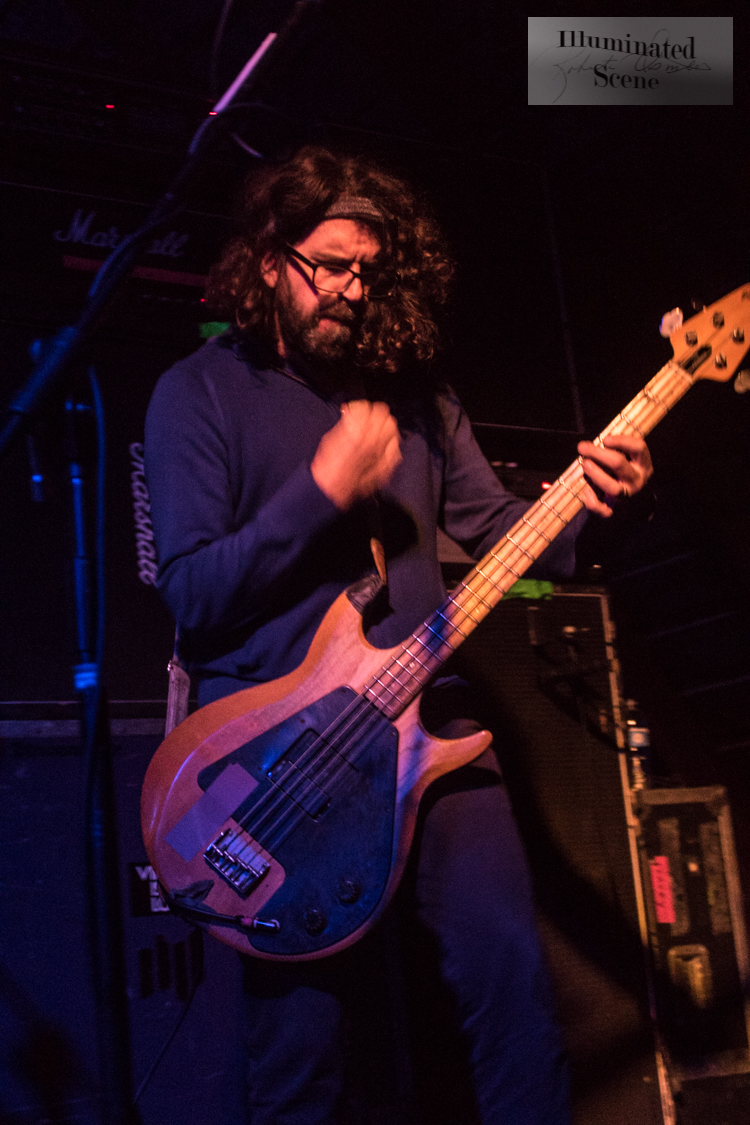
- Barlow performing in 2018

Background information
- Born: Louis Knox Barlow; July 17, 1966 (age 60); Dayton, Ohio, U.S.
- Genres: Alternative rock; indie rock; slacker rock; hardcore punk
- Occupations: Musician, songwriter
- Instruments: Vocals; guitar; bass; percussion; keyboards; drums; ukulele
- Years active: 1982–present
- Labels: Joyful Noise; Shrimper; Smells Like; Mint; Sub Pop; Lo-Fi; Little Brother; Dark Beloved Cloud; City Slang; Merge; Acuarela; Domino
- Member of: Dinosaur Jr.; Sebadoh; The Folk Implosion
- Formerly of: Deep Wound
- Website: loobiecore.com

Louis Knox Barlow (born July 17, 1966) is an American alternative rock musician and songwriter. A founding member of the groups Dinosaur Jr., Sebadoh and The Folk Implosion, Barlow is credited with helping to pioneer the lo-fi style of rock music in the late 1980s and early 1990s. His first band, which was formed in Amherst, Massachusetts, was Deep Wound.

Barlow has released four solo albums.

== Early life ==
Barlow was born in Dayton, Ohio on July 17, 1966, and raised in Jackson, Michigan, and Westfield, Massachusetts.

== Dinosaur Jr. ==
Barlow attended high school in Westfield, Massachusetts, where he met Scott Helland. The two formed the Massachusetts-based hardcore punk band Deep Wound. J Mascis joined the band after answering their ad for a "drummer wanted to play really fast". After becoming disillusioned with the constraints of hardcore, Deep Wound broke up in 1984. Mascis and Barlow reunited that year to form Dinosaur, later Dinosaur Jr. Mascis and Barlow had personality conflicts throughout Dinosaur Jr.'s early existence, and after the 1988 release of their third album, Bug, and the initial supporting tour, Barlow was kicked out of the band.

In 2005, Barlow rejoined the band alongside the original drummer, Murph. Since then, the band has reissued its first three records, toured extensively worldwide and released 6 new records, Beyond, Farm, I Bet on Sky, Give a Glimpse of What Yer Not, Sweep It Into Space and There Near.

== Sebadoh, Sentridoh and the Folk Implosion ==
After his dismissal from Dinosaur Jr., Barlow turned his attention to his band Sebadoh, which he had formed earlier with multi-instrumentalist Eric Gaffney. The project featured low fidelity recording techniques and combined Barlow's introspective, confessional songwriting with Gaffney's discordant noise collages. Bassist and songwriter Jason Loewenstein was added to the line-up in 1989. Sebadoh's early releases include The Freed Man (1989) and Weed Forestin' (1990), the latter of which was originally self-released under the name Sentridoh in 1987. Both albums were officially released by Homestead Records, as was the band's third album, Sebadoh III (1991), which helped establish the "lo-fi" subgenre and became a defining album of 90s indie rock. The band released several studio-recorded albums on Sub Pop Records throughout the 1990s.

As Sebadoh grew in popularity and critical acclaim, Barlow continued work on the Sentridoh side project, which featured mostly home-recorded material similar to his output on the first three Sebadoh albums, but often recorded solo and with a less consistent sound quality. Sentridoh released a trio of cassette-only albums on Shrimper Records in the early 1990s, with the highlights later being collected on CD and vinyl compilations like Winning Losers: A Collection of Home Recordings 89–93 (1994) and Another Collection of Home Recordings (1994). In 1993, Sentridoh released a popular single for the song "Losercore," on the label Smells Like Records founded by Steve Shelley of the American rock band, Sonic Youth. Barlow has called it "the most finely executed of all my releases" thanks to Shelley, who "made sure this looked and sounded great." Numerous other Sentridoh releases on a variety of record labels followed, including releases on his own Loobiecore label.

In 1994, Barlow formed the Folk Implosion with singer-songwriter John Davis. The band released several singles and EPs, and in 1995 reached the Top 40 with the song "Natural One", from the soundtrack to the film Kids by Larry Clark. It remains Barlow's biggest commercial hit.

After the release of Sebadoh's eighth album, The Sebadoh, in 1999, the band went on hiatus and its members went on to pursue other projects. Barlow continued to work with the Folk Implosion, releasing One Part Lullaby in 1999. Barlow took a break from the Folk Implosion in 2000 to collaborate on the album Subsonic 6 with Belgian musician, Rudy Trouvé. In 2003, Barlow released The New Folk Implosion featuring Imaad Wasif on guitar and Sebadoh drummer Russ Pollard on drums. The same year, he appeared as a musician in the film Laurel Canyon. In the spring of 2004, Barlow briefly reunited with Loewenstein for the "Turbo Acoustic" Sebadoh tour. During this tour, he also reunited with J Mascis for a performance of the song "Video Prick" with former Deep Wound vocalist Charlie Nakajima. This performance led to a full-fledged Dinosaur Jr. reunion in 2005, with original members Barlow, Mascis and Murph performing "The Lung" on The Late Late Show with Craig Ferguson on April 15, 2005, and a show at Spaceland in Los Angeles the following night. The band then played well-received tours of the U.S. and Europe throughout the rest of the year, and in 2006 headed to Japan, Australia and New Zealand. In 2007, Barlow reunited with Loewenstein and Gaffney to perform the first Sebadoh shows with the "classic" lineup in 14 years. In June 2013, Sebadoh released their first new music in 14 years; the music was released as an EP precursor to their new album, "Defend Yourself," which was released in September 2013. Both of the new EP and LP albums were released through Joyful Noise Recordings.

== Other collaborations ==
- Released the instrumental split album Subsonic 6 (2000) with Belgian musician, Rudy Trouvé
- Sings on the track "Some" by Sharon Stoned, on the album License to Confuse (1995)
- Sings on the tracks "My Brother Moves" and "Everything You Know Is Wrong" by Production Club, from the album Follow Your Bliss (2003)
- Sings on the track "In the City in the Rain" by the 6ths on Wasps' Nests 6 6/6"
- Plays bass on the track "Strange Song" by Supreme Dicks, on the album The Unexamined Life (1993)

== Solo work ==
Barlow released the first album under his own name, Emoh, in January 2005 on Merge Records. It featured long-time collaborators such as Sebadoh members Jason Loewenstein and Russ Pollard and Lou's sister Abby Barlow, and featured a higher production value than many of his previous solo releases. Jason Crock of Pitchfork called it "the most consistently strong record he's released since the Folk Implosion's One Part Lullaby" and wrote that "even if much of it was recorded at home, Emoh's 14 unassuming folk songs sound like they were created in a professional setting." In November 2005, Barlow performed in Spain, including an appearance at the Tanned Tin festival in Castellón.

Barlow released his second solo album, Goodnight Unknown, in October 2009 on Merge. It was produced by Andrew Murdock and featured numerous guest musicians, including Imaad Wasif on guitar and Dale Crover of the Melvins and Murph on drums. Barlow toured the album in the U.S. in the fall of 2009, opening for Dinosaur Jr. and backed by The Missingmen of Mike Watt + the Missingmen.

Barlow's third solo album, Brace the Wave, was released on September 4, 2015, on Joyful Noise Recordings. It was recorded in six days with Justin Pizzoferrato, who also worked as a sound engineer for Dinosaur Jr. at Sonelab Studios in Massachusetts. The tracks from Brace the Wave feature Barlow's ukulele playing. Barlow also took 100 original Polaroid selfies to accompany the VIP vinyl edition of the album.

On October 28, 2016, Barlow released a 5 track EP entitled Apocalypse Fetish on Joyful Noise Recordings.

In April 2021, it was announced that a solo album entitled Reason to Live would be released on May 28 via Joyful Noise.

== Personal life ==
Barlow's first marriage was to Kathleen Billus, with whom he has two children, Hendrix and Hannelore.

In May 2015, he married knitwear designer Adelle Louise Burda, with whom he has a daughter, Izetta.

Barlow has suffered from social anxiety and low self-esteem.

== Discography ==
=== Albums ===
Year	Title	Name	Label
1990/1991	Losers (re-released in 1995 as "The Original Losing Losers" with altered track listing)	Sentridoh	Shrimper
1992	Most of the Worst and Some of the Best of Sentridoh	Sentridoh	Shrimper
1993	Wasted Pieces (re-issued in 2003 as "Lou B's Wasted Pieces '87 - '93")	Lou B's Acoustic Sentridoh	Shrimper
1994	Winning Losers: A Collection of Home Recordings 89-93 (re-issued in 2006)	Louis Barlow Acoustic Sentridoh	Smells Like Records
1994	Another Collection of Home Recordings	Lou Barlow and Friends	Mint
2000	Subsonic 6 (split album with Rudy Trouvé)	Lou Barlow	Sub Rosa
2002	Free Sentridoh: Songs from Loobiecore	Sentridoh	Loobiecore
2005	Emoh	Lou Barlow	Merge
2009	Goodnight Unknown	Lou Barlow	Merge
2009	Songs from Loobiecore 2.5 - Tour Edition	Lou Barlow as Sentridoh	Loobiecore
2015	Brace the Wave	Lou Barlow	Joyful Noise Recordings
2021	Reason to Live	Lou Barlow	Joyful Noise Recordings

=== Singles ===
Year	Title	Tracks	Name	Label
1992	Losercore (later included on 2006 Winning Losers reissue)	1. "Losercore"; 2. "Really Insane"	Sentridoh	Smells Like Records
2005	Holding Back the Year	1. "Holding Back The Year"; 2. "Finger"; 3. "Terrorize"; 4. "Refused"	Lou Barlow	Domino
2009	The Right	1. "The Right"; 2. "Author"	Lou Barlow	Domino
2011	Welcome Home	1. "Welcome Home" – 2:56	Lou Barlow	Joyful Noise Recordings
2014	State Of Mine (Uke Version)	1. "State Of Mine (Uke Version)"	Lou Barlow	Joyful Noise Recordings
2015	Boundaries	1. "Boundaries"	Lou Barlow	Joyful Noise Recordings
2015	?	1. "Wave"	Lou Barlow	Joyful Noise Recordings
2016	Apocalypse Fetish	1. "Apocalypse Fetish"	Lou Barlow	Joyful Noise Recordings
2016	Anniversary Song	1. "Anniversary Song"	Lou Barlow	Joyful Noise Recordings
2016	The Breeze	1. "The Breeze"	Lou Barlow	Joyful Noise Recordings
2016	Try 2 B	1. "Try 2 B"	Lou Barlow	Joyful Noise Recordings
2016	Pour/Reward	1. "Pour/Reward"	Lou Barlow	Joyful Noise Recordings
2018	Love Intervene	1. "Love Intervene" - 3:45; 2. "Don't Like Changes" - 3:44	Lou Barlow	Joyful Noise Recordings
2019	Over You/How Do I Know	1. "Over You"; 2. "How Do I Know"	Lou Barlow	Joyful Noise Recordings
2019	Cold One/Thirsty	1. "Cold One"; 2. "Thirsty"	Lou Barlow	Joyful Noise Recordings

=== EPs ===
Year	Title	Tracks	Name	Label
1993	The Mysterious Sentridoh e.p.	1. "Good in Others"; 2. "The Spirit That Kills"; 3. "Weakness Is The Secret"; 4. "Cold Love"; 5. "No One Taught Me"; 6. "No Matter What"	Sentridoh	Little Brother Records
1993	Sub Pop Singles Club – Dec 93	1. "I Am Not Mocking You"; 2. "Survival"; 3. "Helpless Heartbreak"; 4. "Dirty Mind"; 5. "Forever Instant"	Lou Barlow	Sub Pop
1993	Louis Barlow's Acoustic Sentridoh	1. "Natural Nature"; 2. "Don't Need"; 3. "Endless Tease"; 4. "Paranoid Revolution"	Louis Barlow's Acoustic Sentridoh	Lo-Fi Recordings
2007	Mirror the Eye	1. "Yawning Blue Messiah" 3:02; 2. "Faith Defies The Night" 2:13; 3. "You're A Goa"t 2:49; 4. "My Surrender" 2:59; 5. "Mirror The Eye" 1:37	Lou Barlow as Sentridoh	Acuarela
2010	Sentridoh III	1. "Apologize"; 2. "Gravitate"; 3. "One Machine, One Long Fight"; 4. "On The Face"; 5. "Caterpillar Girl"; 6. "Faith Defies The Night"; 7. "Losercore"; 8. "Praise"; 9. "I'm So Glad"	lou barlow + missingmen	Merge
2016	Apocalypse Fetish	1. The Breeze; 2. Apocalypse Fetish; 3. Anniversary Song; 4. Pour/Reward; 5. try 2 b	Lou Barlow	Joyful Noise

=== Live ===
Year	Title	Name	Label
1996	Lou Barlow Plays Waterfront	Lou Barlow	Spun
2011	Live at Missing Link Records	Lou Barlow	Missing Link

=== Compilation ===
Year	Title	Name	Label
1994	A Collection of Previously Released Songs	Lou Barlow and his Sentridoh	City Slang

=== Featured in compilations ===
Year	Track(s)	Title	Label
1991	"Commercial Losers: Sensive Dull Thump, King of the Dry Hump I"	Capgun – A Shrimper Compilation	Shrimper
1991	"Me and My Arrow"	Ghost of a Rollercoaster	Shrimper
1991	"Revolution #37'"	Back to the Egg, Asshole	Shrimper
1992	"Certain Dance Circumstance"	Pawnshop Reverb	Shrimper
1993	"Same Old, Say Mould"	Caution! Hot Tips!	Dedicated / Melody Maker
1993	"Certain Dance – Circumstance / Revolution #37"	Abridged Perversion	Shrimper
1994	"I Stopped Singing"	Ow, Quit It! Vol.2	Volvolo
1994	"Morning Rain '92"	Cool Beans #3 Split; split 7-inch with Matt, Dis- and sold with Cool Beans zine #3	Cool Beans
1994	"Black Sheep"	Our Band Could Be Your Life; a Minutemen tribute album	Little Brother Records
1995	"Sorry"	Escargot (EP); sold with Escargot zine	Sick & Tired / Dark Beloved Cloud
1995	"Loving Limbs"/ "No Telling"	Chemical Imbalance Vol.3, #1; included with Chemical Imbalance zine	Chemical Imbalance
1996	"Skull"	Pipeline! Live Boston Rock on WMBR	Kimchee / Slow River
1996	"Blown Pony"	More of Our Stupid Noise	Squirtgun Records
1997	"Riding"	Flygirl (EP) #7; sold with Flygirl zine #7	Flygirl / Blue Bunny
1998	"Blown Pony"	More of Our Stupid Noise '98	Squirtgun Records/ Nettwerk
2001	"Morning's After Me"	Colonel Jeffrey Pumpernickel	Off
2003	"None of Your Goddam Bizness"	In the Film They Made Us a Little More Articulate	Escape Goat
2005	"A Man in Love"	Comes with a Smile Vol.13; came with the Comes with a Smile zine #17	Comes with a Smile
2006	"Forever Instant"	Rough Trade Shops – Singer Songwriter 1	Mute Records Ltd.
2009	"The Ballad of Daykitty"/ "I'm So Glad"	Score! 20 Years of Merge Records – Volume 6	Merge
2009	"Sit Back and Watch"	Local Currency Digital EP	Fayettenam
2009	"Song of the Tall Poppy"	Stroke: Songs for Chris Knox	A Major
2010	"Smooth Sounds for Your Fucking Face"	Smooth Sounds: The Future Hits of WCKR SPGT	Shrimper
2010	"Imagination Blind" (live)	It Happened Here	St. Ives Records
2011	"Game of Pricks"	Sing for Your Meat; a Guided by Voices tribute album	No More Fake Labels

=== with Dinosaur Jr ===
- Dinosaur (1985)
- You're Living All Over Me (1987)
- Bug (1988)
- Beyond (2007)
- Farm (2009)
- I Bet on Sky (2012)
- Give a Glimpse of What Yer Not (2016)
- Sweep It Into Space (2021)
- There Near (2026)

=== Tribute ===
(2012) Just Gimme Lou Barlow (A Paperheart Tribute to)
