= Murph (drummer) =

American drummer

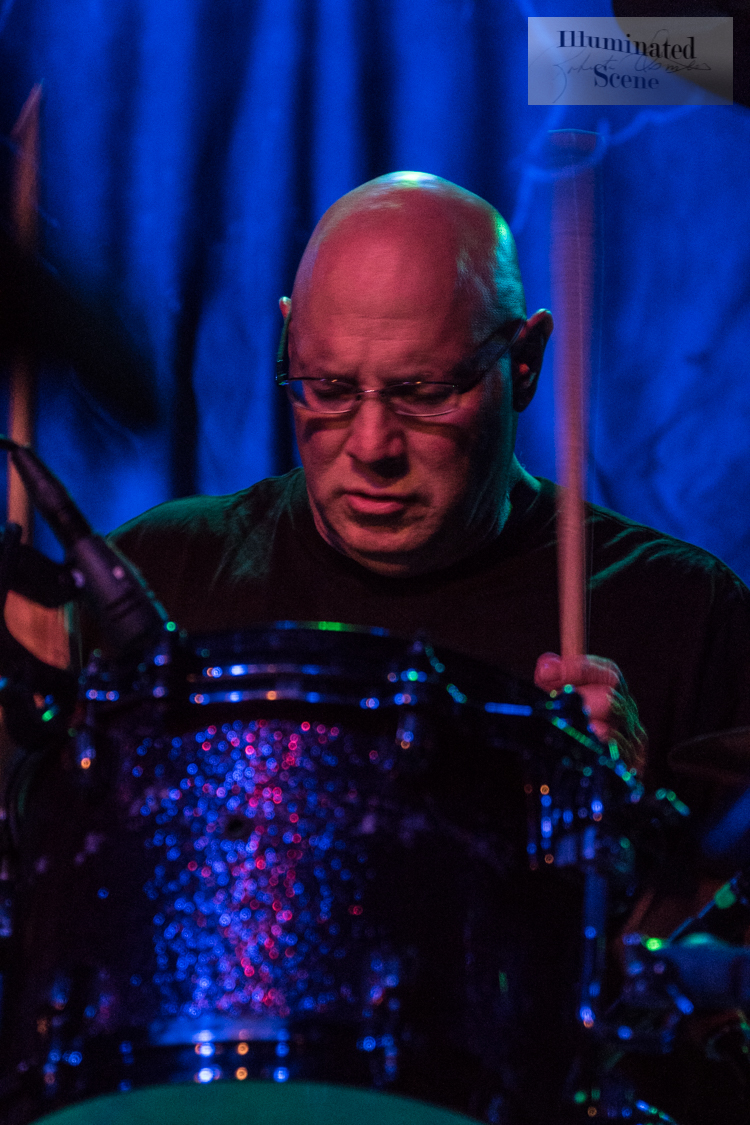
- Murphy with Dinosaur Jr. 2018

Background information
- Born: Emmett Jefferson "Patrick" Murphy III; December 21, 1964 (age 61); Washington, DC
- Genre: Alternative rock
- Occupation: Musician
- Instruments: Drums, synthesizer
- Years active: 1984–present
- Labels: Homestead, SST, Blanco y Negro/Sire, Merge, Fat Possum, Atlantic

Emmett Jefferson Murphy III (born December 21, 1964), professionally credited as both Patrick Murphy and Murph, is an American musician best known for being the drummer for the alternative rock band Dinosaur Jr. He was a member of the group from its founding in 1984 through 1993, and since the original lineup reformed in 2005.

== Musical career ==
Murph was initially the drummer in the hardcore punk band All White Jury. He met J Mascis and Lou Barlow through Mascis' friend Charlie Nakajima and was soon after invited to join their band Deep Wound. Deep Wound disbanded and Mascis, Barlow, and Murph formed Dinosaur Jr without Nakajima. Murph would remain in the band until leaving the group in 1993. He joined The Lemonheads in 1995.

In April 2005, Murph returned to Dinosaur Jr. with J Mascis and Lou Barlow, reforming the original line-up. The trio has released six Dinosaur Jr. albums since reforming: the comeback album Beyond in 2007, Farm in 2009, I Bet on Sky in 2012, Give a Glimpse of What Yer Not in 2016, Sweep It Into Space in 2021, and most recently There Near in 2026. The band has steadily toured the world since reforming.

Since 2000 he has been the drummer of the Massachusetts space rock band, Architectural Metaphor.

He is the son of E. Jefferson Murphy, a professor of African studies at Smith College.
