= Russell Pollard =

American rock musician (born 1975)

- Born: 1975 (age 50–51)
- Genres: Indie rock, Americana
- Instruments: Bass guitar, guitar, drums, vocals
- Years active: Late 1990s–present

Russell "Russ" Pollard (born 1975) is an American rock musician, who has been a member of Sebadoh, The Folk Implosion, Alaska!, Everest, and the Calf Fiends, a trio fronted by Louisville-born writer J.D. Daniels which also included stalwart Louisville musician Tony Bailey, who died in 2009 at age 31.

== Biography ==
Pollard started off as a member of Louisville post-hardcore stalwarts Hedge and Out, before moving on to the energetic prog-punk of the Calf Fiends in 1996-1997. Pollard joined Sebadoh in the late 1990s as drummer, playing on the band's seventh studio album, The Sebadoh. He formed Alaska! in 2000 with Imaad Wasif in Los Angeles, the band releasing their debut album Emotions in 2003. His working relationship with Sebadoh's Lou Barlow continued when he played on Sentridoh's Free Sentridoh: Songs from Loobiecore album, and he is also a member of the Folk Implosion, becoming Barlow's main songwriting partner after the departure of John Davis. He also played drums on Barlow's 2005 solo album Emoh.

After Alaska!'s final album Rescue Through Tomahawk was released in 2005 he formed Everest in Los Angeles, as singer and guitarist. The debut Everest album, Ghost Notes, was released in 2008. Everest toured with Wilco and Neil Young in 2008-09, signed to Young's Vapor Records label, and played live on Late Night with Jimmy Fallon. Pollard's second album with Everest, On Approach, was released in 2010.

Pollard also recorded with former Sebadoh bandmate Jason Loewenstein as Amnesiac Godz, and played bass and drums on Earlimart's 2007 album Mentor Tormentor.

Pollard also produced and performed on The Watson Twins debut EP Southern Manners, and co-produced their albums Fire Songs and Talking to You, Talking to Me.

He also acted in the 2002 movie Laurel Canyon, playing the part of Rowan, a drummer in Ian's (Alessandro Nivola) band. He co-composed The Folk Implosion's "Make it With the Best", which was included on the soundtrack of the film Thirteen, and Alaska!'s "Resistance", which was used in the soundtrack of Catch and Release.

== Discography ==
=== with Sebadoh ===
Albums

- The Sebadoh (1999), Domino - UK #45

Singles

- "Flame" (1999), Domino - UK #30
- "It's All You" (1999), Domino

=== with Amnesiac Godz ===
- Guided Missile Split Single (1999), Guided Missile

=== with Sentridoh ===
- Free Sentridoh: Songs from Loobiecore (2002), Domino

=== with The Folk Implosion ===
Albums

- The New Folk Implosion (2003), Domino

Singles

- Brand Of Skin (2003), Domino
- Pearl (2003), Domino

=== with Alaska! ===
- Emotions (2002), B-Girl/Flying Nun
- Rescue Through Tomahawk (2005), Altitude

=== with Lou Barlow ===
- Emoh (2005), Merge/Domino

=== with Earlimart ===
- Mentor Tormentor (2007), Shout! Factory

=== with Everest ===
Albums

- Ghost Notes (2008), Vapor
- On Approach (2010), Vapor/Warner Bros.
- Ownerless (2012), Vapor/ATO Records

Singles

- Everest EP (2008) - self-released
- "Let Go" (2010), Vapor

=== Other appearances ===
- Laurel Canyon (Original Soundtrack) (2003), Hollywood: "Shade & Honey"/"Someday I Will Treat You Good" - Alessandro Nivola Featuring Lou Barlow, Ahmad Wasif And Russ Pollard
