= The Folk Implosion (EP) =

1996 EP by the indie rock band The Folk Implosion

EP by The Folk Implosion
- Released: January 30, 1996
- Genre: Indie rock; lo-fi
- Length: 17:00
- Label: Communion Label

The Folk Implosion chronology
| Take a Look Inside (1994) | The Folk Implosion (1996) | Dare to Be Surprised (1997) |

The Folk Implosion is a compilation EP by American indie rock band The Folk Implosion. It was released in 1996 on the Communion Label. The release consisted of songs from the band's 1994 EP Electric Idiot and 1995 single "Palm of My Hand".

== Track listing ==
| No. | Title | Length |
|---|---|---|
| 1. | "Palm of My Hand" | 2:12 |
| 2. | "Mood Swing" | 2:38 |
| 3. | "Opening Day" | 1:47 |
| 4. | "Electric Idiot" | 1:55 |
| 5. | "Lo-Fi Suicide" | 2:21 |
| 6. | "I Reserve the Right to Rock" | 2:17 |
| 7. | "Final Score" | 3:50 |

== Personnel ==
- Lou Barlow - bass guitar, drums, vocals
- John Davis - guitar, drums, vocals
