= Catch and Release (2006 film) =

- Theatrical release poster
- Directed by: Susannah Grant
- Written by: Susannah Grant
- Produced by: Jenno Topping
- Starring: Jennifer Garner; Timothy Olyphant; Kevin Smith; Sam Jaeger; Fiona Shaw; Juliette Lewis
- Cinematography: John Lindley
- Edited by: Anne V. Coates
- Music by: Brian Transeau; Tommy Stinson
- Production companies: Columbia Pictures; Relativity Media
- Distributed by: Sony Pictures Releasing
- Release dates: October 20, 2006 (Austin Film Festival); January 26, 2007 (United States)
- Running time: 107 minutes
- Country: United States
- Language: English
- Budget: $25 million
- Box office: $16 million

Catch and Release is a 2006 American romantic comedy film written and directed by Susannah Grant, her first film as director, and starring Jennifer Garner, Timothy Olyphant, Kevin Smith, Sam Jaeger and Juliette Lewis.

In the film, after a woman's fiancé dies, she seeks comfort in his friends, learning his secrets while falling for his best friend.

Filming took place in 2005 in Vancouver and Boulder, Colorado. Catch and Release premiered at the Austin Film Festival on October 20, 2006, and was released in the United States on January 26, 2007. The film bombed at the box office, earning $16 million against a $25 million budget.

== Plot ==
In Boulder, Gray Wheeler attends the funeral of her fiancé, Grady Douglas, on the day they were supposed to be married. Seeking solitude behind a shower curtain, she hears Grady's best friend, Fritz, having sex with the caterer.

Eve, Grady's attorney, confirms that, as they were not married, Gray will get nothing. Grady secretly had an investment account with a million dollars in it, which she had known nothing about.

Gray realizes that she can no longer afford to rent the house that they had picked out. With the help of Grady's two close friends, Dennis and Sam, she puts her things into storage and moves in with them. Fritz, currently between directing commercials in California, also comes to stay, causing tension between him and Gray.

Gray discovers that Grady transferred $3,000 every month to an unknown person. Later, finding Grady's phone, she listens to a string of messages from a woman asking about money. Gray asks Fritz for answers (as it is a Los Angeles number), and he reveals that Grady had a son, whose massage therapist mother depended on the money he sent. Fritz tells Gray that the boy is eight and therefore was conceived before she met Grady.

Gray is further troubled when Mrs. Douglas asks her to return the family heirloom engagement ring. She refuses and keeps it. The other woman, Maureen, and her son, Mattie, come looking for Grady. Gray sees Mattie is actually four, and realizes Grady was cheating on her. Confronting Fritz, they end up in a passionate kiss.

Gray does not want anything to do with Maureen, but the guys are reluctant to send the son of their dead friend away so quickly, so they all get to know each other over dinner. Trying to understand how Grady could secretly cheat on her, Gray blurts out her belief that "catch and release" fishermen are cruel and should just eat the fish.

Sam and Maureen have similar scattered personalities and connect well, but he stops her when she initiates sex while Mattie is near. Gray and Fritz become intimate. On a day trip to a river, Sam teaches Mattie to fly fish, while Dennis tells Gray he has feelings for her. He is upset to learn that Gray and Fritz hooked up, but she dismisses it as "less than nothing", not realizing Fritz can hear them. Believing she does not care, he returns to Malibu.

Mrs. Douglas insists Mattie take a DNA test before inheriting Grady's money; the test shows Mattie is not his. Maureen has no idea how to find Rafael, the likely father who she had sex with a few days before Grady, and is unsure how to support Mattie without the money. Gray tells Mrs. Douglas to either give money to this child that Grady had loved as his own, or Gray will sell the family engagement ring to help Maureen support him.

Gathering at the dedication ceremony for the peace garden Dennis has built to memorialize Grady, Mrs. Douglas gives Maureen $1 million. She then tells Gray to keep the ring, as she just wanted her boy back. Dennis moves out and Maureen and Mattie move in with Sam, finding new support and keeping the Douglas family money. Gray goes to Malibu and finds Fritz playing with his dog on the beach—they embrace and kiss.

== Cast ==
- Jennifer Garner as Gray
- Timothy Olyphant as Fritz
- Kevin Smith as Sam
- Sam Jaeger as Dennis
- Tina Lifford as Eve
- Fiona Shaw as Mrs. Douglas (Ellen)
- Juliette Lewis as Maureen

== Production ==
Filming began in March 2005, in Vancouver, British Columbia, Canada. Additional filming took place in December 2005. In July 2005, several scenes were filmed in Boulder, Colorado, where the story takes place.

Kevin Smith said while filming this movie, he and Lewis went to the set of the Uwe Boll film In the Name of the King because Smith had heard they had Krispy Kreme doughnuts, which were flown in by Burt Reynolds, who was appearing in that film. They took boxes of doughnuts back to the Catch and Release set, and someone on set asked if they had stolen the doughnuts from the set of In the Name.., because Reynolds saw someone running away with them.

== Soundtrack ==
The original film score is produced by Brian Wayne Transeau (BT) and Tommy Stinson.

Songs used in the official trailer for the film included "Just a Ride" by Jem and "Breathe (2 AM)" by Anna Nalick.

Music featured in Catch and Release is performed by:

1. Foo Fighters – "Razor"
2. The Lemonheads – "My Drug Buddy"
3. Blinker the Star – "A Nest for Two"
4. The Magic Numbers – "Mornings Eleven"
5. Gary Jules – "Pills"
6. Steve Durand – "Electrified and Ripe"
7. New Radiant Storm King – "The Winding Staircase"
8. Audible – "Sky Signal"
9. Peter Maclaggan – "Leaving the Ground"
10. Joshua Radin – "What if You"
11. Gomez – "These 3 Sins"
12. Alaska! – "Resistance"
13. Paul Westerberg – "Let the Bad Times Roll"
14. The Swallows – "Turning Blue"
15. Andrew Rodriguez – "What I Done"
16. Death Cab for Cutie – "Soul Meets Body"
17. Doves – "There Goes the Fear"

AllMusic gave the soundtrack 2.5 out of 5.

== Reception ==
=== Box office ===
The film grossed $15,539,051 in the United States and $456,458 in other territories, making it a bomb at the box office.

=== Critical response ===
On the review aggregator website Rotten Tomatoes, 23% of 132 critics' reviews are positive. The website's consensus reads: "A romantic dramedy with boring, stock characters and contrived situations." Metacritic, which uses a weighted average, assigned the film a score of 43 out of 100, based on 28 critics, indicating "mixed or average" reviews. Audiences surveyed by CinemaScore gave the film a grade B.

Lael Loewenstein of Variety called it "Neither as bad as its early buzz and January berth would suggest nor as good as it should have been". The film received "Two Thumbs Up" from Richard Roeper and guest critic Govindini Murty on At the Movies with Ebert & Roeper. Even with most of the reviews being negative, a number of critics praised the performance given by Smith.
