= Songs from Loobiecore =

Studio album by Lou Barlow
- Released: 2002
- Recorded: 2001
- Studio: home-recorded album
- Genre: Folk rock, lo-fi
- Label: Domino

Lou Barlow chronology
Another Collection of Home Recordings (1994)	Songs from Loobiecore (2002)	Emoh (2005)

Songs from Loobiecore is a solo album by Lou Barlow, released in 2002 as "Free Sentridoh" in the United States by himself and in the UK by Domino.

== Music ==
According to Barlow, the album was released during a low point in his career, "with the dual major label failures of The Sebadoh...and the Folk Implosion’s One Part Lullaby," and the album "chronicles the time well."

The songs were recorded at different times, mostly in 2000 and 2001, but some dating back to 1990. "What Would Jesus Do" was recorded live in a small house in Kentucky by Sebadoh member Jason Loewenstein during rehearsals for the band's 1999 release, The Sebadoh, and was co-written by that album's drummer Russ Pollard, who also provided backup vocals. Other songs, such as "Don't Call Me Writer," address the personal problems he was going through at this time.

== Reception ==
The album received mixed reviews from critics. Eric Carr of Pitchfork wrote that "some truly fantastic songs can be found here," but that "ultimately there isn't much to redeem Tales from Loobiecore. It slips into a coma before the five-minute mark, and though it shows promise here and there, even a die-hard Lou Barlow fan might consider pulling the plug."

In a 2016 interview with Noisey, Barlow listed the album as his third favorite of his solo albums, saying it was "easily one of the most fluids, carefree, dark and tuneful things I’ve done."

== Track listing ==
1. "Intro"
2. "Mountain on the Hill"
3. "Open Door War"
4. "Blue Sunshine"
5. "Choke the Rhythm"
6. "The Devil +"
7. "That Kind of a Year"
8. "What Would Jesus Do?"
9. "Over the Fall"
10. "None of your Goddam Bizness"
11. "I Love My Momma"
12. "Up From the Well"
13. "On the Face"
14. "U Can Drive"
15. "Impulse"
16. "No More Parties"
17. "Bad Habits"
18. "Ride a Hearse, Build a Throne"
19. "Girls Come First"
20. "Don't Call Me Writer"
21. "Songfull/ Rehole"
22. "Spacescape Imagination Station"
23. "The Cougar Hood"
