= Beachwood Canyon =

Beachwood Canyon may refer to:

- Beachwood Canyon, Los Angeles
- Beachwood Canyon (album), a 2016 album by Jem
