= It's Amazing =

Single by Jem

from the album Down to Earth and Sex and the City: Original Motion Picture Soundtrack
- Released: 3 June 2008
- Length: 4:00
- Label: ATO
- Songwriter(s): Jem; Lester Mendez
- Producer(s): Jem; Lester Mendez; Kim Pinola

Jem singles chronology
| "24" (2005) | "It's Amazing" (2008) | "Crazy" (2008) |

Alternative cover
- US cover

"It's Amazing" is a song by Welsh singer Jem, released as the first single from her second album Down to Earth on 3 June 2008 in the United States and on 2 February 2009 in Europe. The song was featured in the 2008 film Sex and the City and on the official soundtrack. It was also used in the official trailer of Julie & Julia, episodes 89 and 90 (season 5, 2009) of the television series Medium, and in the episode "By Accident" (season 1) of 90210.

== Music video ==
The official music video was directed by Saam Gabbay and Jem.

== Track listing ==
=== US single ===
1. "It's Amazing" (album version) – 4:00

=== European single ===
1. "It's Amazing" (radio edit) – 3:30
2. "It's Amazing" (album version) – 4:00

== Charts ==
Chart performance for "It's Amazing"
| Chart (2009) | Peak position |
|---|---|
| Germany (GfK) | 77 |
