= Cold Night =

Cold Night may refer to:

- Cold Night, a novel by Al Sarrantonio
- "Cold Night" (You Me at Six song), 2014
- "Cold Night", a song by The Folk Implosion from Dare to Be Surprised, 1997
- "Cold Nights", a song by Stan Walker from All In, 2022
