= Sex and the City (soundtracks) =

2008 film score recorded by various artists

The film score for Sex and the City was composed by Aaron Zigman and recorded with a large ensemble of the Hollywood Studio Symphony at the Newman Stage at 20th Century Fox in April 2008. The soundtrack to the film also features original and traditional songs and compositions. Two soundtracks were released in 2008.

== Sex and the City: Original Motion Picture Soundtrack ==
Sex and the City: Original Motion Picture Soundtrack

Soundtrack album by various artists
- Released: May 26, 2008
- Genres: Pop; rock; R&B; soul
- Length: 58:06
- Label: New Line
- Producers: India Arie; Lenny B; Finn Bjarnson; Bliss; Steve Booker; Jack Evans; Jem; Greg Kurstin; Rico Love; Frank "Blame" Macek; Madison Park; Lester Mendez; Willie Mitchell; Gil Norton; Jeff Pfeifer; Rob Pfeifer; Ryan Raddon; Rick Rubin; Salaamremi.com; Russell Simmons; Jack Splash; Deb Talan; Steve Tannen

Professional ratings
Review scores
Source	Rating
AllMusic	2.5/5 stars

The first soundtrack to Sex and the City was released on May 26, 2008, in the United Kingdom and on May 27 in the United States.

The soundtrack debuted at number two on the Billboard 200 with 66,000 copies sold in its first week, the highest debut for a multi-artist theatrical film soundtrack since 2005's Get Rich or Die Tryin'.

=== Track listing ===
No.	Title	Writer(s)	Producer(s)	Length
1.	"Labels or Love" (performed by Fergie)	Salaam Remi; Rico Love; Douglas Cuomo	Salaamremi.com; Love^{[a]}	3:52
2.	"All Dressed in Love" (performed by Jennifer Hudson)	Jack Splash; Cee-Lo Green; Remi	Splash^{[b]}; Salaamremi.com^{[b]}	3:22
3.	"Mercy" (performed by Duffy)	Aimée Ann Duffy; Steve Booker	Booker	3:40
4.	"The Look of Love" (Madison Park vs. Lenny B Remix) (performed by Nina Simone)	Burt Bacharach; Hal David	Madison Park^{[c]}; Lenny B^{[c]}	3:42
5.	"New York Girls" (performed by Morningwood)	Pedro Yanowitz	Gil Norton	2:56
6.	"All This Beauty" (performed by The Weepies)	Deb Talan; Steve Tannen	Talan; Tannen	3:17
7.	"I Like the Way" (performed by Kaskade)	Finn Bjarnson; Colette Marino; Ryan Raddon	Raddon; Bjarnson	3:40
8.	"It's Amazing" (performed by Jem)	Jem Griffiths; Lester Mendez	Mendez; Jem^{[d]}	3:55
9.	"How Deep Is Your Love" (performed by The Bird and the Bee)	Barry Gibb; Robin Gibb; Maurice Gibb	Greg Kurstin	3:22
10.	"The Heart of the Matter" (performed by India Arie)	Don Henley; Michael W. Campbell; John Souther	Arie^{[b]}; Frank "Blame" Macek^{[b]}	4:42
11.	"Auld Lang Syne" (performed by Mairi Campbell and Dave Francis)	Robert Burns	Jack Evans	3:22
12.	"Kissing" (performed by Bliss)	Steffen Aaskoven; Marc Andersen; Salvador Embalo; Lars Erlandsson; Sanne Gottlieb; Klaus Jensen; Paw Lagermann; Fredrik Lenander	Bliss	6:09
13.	"How Can You Mend a Broken Heart" (performed by Al Green featuring Joss Stone)	B. Gibb; R. Gibb	Willie Mitchell; Salaamremi.com^{[c]}^{[d]}	7:00
14.	"Walk This Way" (performed by Run-DMC featuring Steven Tyler and Joe Perry of Aerosmith)	Tyler; Anthony Perry	Russell Simmons; Rick Rubin	5:11
15.	"Sex and the City Movie Theme" (performed by The Pfeifer Broz. Orchestra)	Cuomo	Jeff Pfeifer; Rob Pfeifer	0:50

Notes

- ^{^a} signifies a vocal producer
- ^{^b} signifies a main and vocal producer
- ^{^c} signifies a remixer
- ^{^d} signifies an additional producer
- "Mercy" does not appear on the US release of the soundtrack.

Sample credits

- "Labels or Love" contains an interpolation of "Sex and the City Theme" by Douglas Cuomo.

=== Charts ===
==== Weekly charts ====
Chart (2008)	Peak position
Australian Albums (ARIA)	4
Austrian Albums (Ö3 Austria)	10
Canadian Albums (Billboard)	3
Czech Albums (ČNS IFPI)	20
Danish Albums (Hitlisten)	4
Finnish Albums (Suomen virallinen lista)	8
French Albums (SNEP)	58
German Albums (Offizielle Top 100)	26
Hungarian Albums (MAHASZ)	7
Irish Compilation Albums (IRMA)	5
Mexican Albums (Top 100 Mexico)	66
New Zealand Albums (RMNZ)	20
Polish Albums (ZPAV)	31
Swiss Albums (Schweizer Hitparade)	24
UK Compilation Albums (Official Charts)	6
US Billboard 200	2
US Soundtrack Albums (Billboard)	1

==== Year-end charts ====
Chart (2008)	Position
Hungarian Albums (MAHASZ)	89
US Billboard 200	145
US Soundtrack Albums (Billboard)	17

=== Certifications ===
Region	Certification	Certified units/sales
United Kingdom (BPI)	Gold	100,000^{*}
^{*} Sales figures based on certification alone.

=== Release history ===
Region	Date	Label
United Kingdom	May 26, 2008	Decca
United States	May 27, 2008	New Line

== Sex and the City: Volume 2 ==
Sex and the City: Volume 2

Soundtrack album by various artists
- Released: September 22, 2008
- Genres: Pop; rock; R&B; soul
- Length: 54:26
- Label: New Line
- Producers: Cason Cooley; Ian Cross; Jermaine Dupri; Darryl Farmer; Dean Gillard; Ken Gioia; Alison Goldfrapp; Shep Goodman; Will Gregory; Andrew Hale; Shana Halligan; Katie Herzig; Rico Love; Ingrid Michaelson; Buddy Miller; Nick Phillips; Salaamremi.com; Manuel Seal; Kiran Shahani; Jack Splash; Stargate; Matt Ward

Sex and the City: Volume 2 is the follow-up album to Sex and the City: Original Motion Picture Soundtrack soundtrack. It was released on September 22, 2008, in the United Kingdom and on September 23, 2008, in the United States, followed by a worldwide release the following weeks.

=== Track listing ===
No.	Title	Writer(s)	Producer(s)	Length
1.	"Click Flash" (performed by Ciara)	Remi; Love	Salaamremi.com; Love^{[e]}	3:53
2.	"My First Love" (performed by Craig David)	David; Remi	Salaamremi.com	4:17
3.	"2nite" (performed by Janet Jackson)	Phillip "Taj" Jackson; Mikkel S. Eriksen; Tor Erik Hermansen	Stargate; Jermaine Dupri^{[e]}; Manuel Seal^{[e]}; Ian Cross^{[e]}	4:08
4.	"Beautiful" (performed by Goldfrapp)	Alison Goldfrapp; Will Gregory	Goldfrapp; Gregory	4:45
5.	"Real Girl" (performed by Mutya Buena)	Lenny Kravitz; Niara Scarlett; Matt Ward; Dean Gillard	Ward; Gillard	3:25
6.	"Pretty Please (Love Me)" (performed by Estelle featuring Cee-Lo)	Estelle Swaray; Jack Splash; Thomas Callaway; John Stephens; Drew Dixon	Splash	3:55
7.	"Trouble" (performed by Bitter:Sweet)	Kiran Shahani; Shana Halligan	Shahani; Halligan	3:15
8.	"Dangerous" (performed by Elijah Kelley)	Kelley; Darryl Farmer	Farmer	3:49
9.	"Look at You" (performed by Katie Herzig)	Herzig	Herzig; Cason Cooley	2:41
10.	"Little Romance" (performed by Ingrid Michaelson)	Michaelson	Michaelson; Ken Gioia; Shep Goodman	2:43
11.	"We Got Love" (performed by Ryan Shaw)	Shaw; Jimmy Bralower; Johnny Gale		3:41
12.	"Fool's Gold" (performed by Amy Winehouse)	Winehouse	Salaam "The Chameleon" Remi	3:37
13.	"Mockingbird" (performed by Allison Moorer)	Moorer	Buddy Miller	3:17
14.	"Hey Baby" (performed by The Champagne Flutes)	Remi; Dale; Gstettenbauer	Salaamremi.com	2:39
15.	"You Look So Good" (performed by Owen Brady)	Brady; Pat Donne	Andrew Hale; Nick Phillips	4:14

Notes

- ^{^e} signifies a vocal producer

Sample credits

- "Real Girl" contains excerpts from "It Ain't Over 'til It's Over" by Lenny Kravitz

=== Charts ===
Chart (2008)	Peak position
UK Soundtrack Albums (Official Charts)	23
US Billboard 200	45
US Soundtrack Albums (Billboard)	3

=== Release history ===
Region	Date
United Kingdom	September 22, 2008
United States	September 23, 2008
Europe	September 30, 2008
