= Tell It to My Heart =

Tell It to My Heart may refer to:

- Tell It to My Heart (album), by Taylor Dayne, 1988
- "Tell It to My Heart" (Meduza song), featuring Hozier, 2021
- "Tell It to My Heart" (Taylor Dayne song), 1987
- "Tell It to My Heart", a season five episode of Degrassi: The Next Generation
- "Tell It to My Heart", a song by Jem from the 2016 album Beachwood Canyon
