= They (song) =

2004 single by Jem

Single by Jem

from the album Finally Woken
- B-side: "Maybe I'm Amazed"
- Released: 17 February 2004
- Studio: Mum's spare bedroom
- Length: 3:15
- Label: ATO; Sony BMG
- Songwriters: Jem Griffiths; Gerard Young
- Producers: Yoad Nevo; Jem; Ge-ology

Jem singles chronology
"They" (2004)	"Just a Ride" (2005)

Alternative cover
- UK CD2 and Australian cover

Alternative cover
- They: Remixes

Audio sample
- "They": file; help

"They" is the first single released from Welsh singer Jem's debut album, Finally Woken (2004). It includes a sample of the Swingle Singers' 1963 adaptation of Johann Sebastian Bach's Prelude in F minor (BWV 881) from their album Jazz Sebastian Bach. Jem recorded the song's vocals in her mother's spare bedroom.

"They" was released in the United States in February 2004 and was issued worldwide the following year. The song became Jem's most successful single, reaching number six on the UK Singles Chart, number one in Hungary, and the top 10 in Greece, Ireland, and the Commonwealth of Independent States.

== Music videos ==
Jem released two music videos for "They". The UK version, directed by Laurent Briet, features Jem stripping herself in a spaceship in the style of Jane Fonda in the opening scene of Barbarella (although she remains covered by strategically placed light based holograms of planetary orbital paths); this is actually a boy dreaming about her as he constructs a model of the same spaceship back on Earth. The US version features Jem walking at a park while being accompanied by a number of children. She then encounters several signs and decides to disobey them. Some intercut scenes show her at a roundabout being spun by children.

== Track listings ==
UK CD1

1. "They"
2. "Maybe I'm Amazed" (Paul McCartney)

UK CD2 and Australian CD single

1. "They" (original version)
2. "They" (Cut Chemist remix)
3. "They" (MDK & Ayesha Mix) (Eye in the Sky mix)
4. "They" (video)

== Credits and personnel ==
Credits are lifted from the Finally Woken album booklet.

Locations

- Vocals recorded in Jem's mother's spare bedroom
- Mixed and mastered at Sanctuary Townhouse Studios (London, England)

Personnel

- Jem – writing (as Jem Griffiths), production, arrangement
- Gerard Young – writing
- Yoad Nevo – instruments, production, arrangement, mixing, mastering
- Ge-ology – production
- Andy Saunders – mixing assistance
- Dan Porter – mixing assistance

== Charts ==
=== Weekly charts ===
Chart (2005)	Peak position
Australia (ARIA)	28
Austria (Ö3 Austria Top 40)	15
Belgium (Ultratip Bubbling Under Flanders)	11
Belgium (Ultratip Bubbling Under Wallonia)	7
CIS Airplay (TopHit)	10
Germany (GfK)	45
Greece (IFPI)	8
Hungary (Rádiós Top 40)	1
Ireland (IRMA)	8
Italy (FIMI)	47
Netherlands (Dutch Top 40)	27
Netherlands (Single Top 100)	29
Russia Airplay (TopHit)	11
Scottish Singles Sales (Official Charts)	7
Sweden (Sverigetopplistan)	47
Ukraine Airplay (TopHit)	8
UK Singles (Official Charts)	6
US Adult Alternative Airplay (Billboard)	18

=== Year-end charts ===
Chart (2005)	Position
CIS Airplay (TopHit)	25
Hungary (Rádiós Top 40)	17
Russia Airplay (TopHit)	26
Ukraine Airplay (TopHit)	21
UK Singles (OCC)	64

== Release history ==
Region	Date	Format(s)	Label(s)	Ref.
United States	17 February 2004	Triple A radio	ATO	
United Kingdom	14 March 2005	CD	ATO; Sony BMG	
Australia	23 May 2005	CD	ATO; Sony BMG	
United States	20 June 2005	Hot adult contemporary radio	ATO	
