= Lowercase (band) =

American rock band

lowercase
- Origin: Palm Desert, California
- Genres: Post-hardcore, noise rock, post-punk, slowcore, emocore
- Years active: 1993–2000; 2025–present
- Labels: Amphetamine Reptile, Punk in my Vitamins
- Past members: Imaad Wasif, Brian Girgus, Justin Halterlein, Tiber Scheer

Lowercase (sometimes stylized as lowercase) is a band from Palm Desert, California, led by Imaad Wasif on vocals and guitar and Brian Girgus on drums. The band put out 2 full-length albums on the Minneapolis label Amphetamine Reptile before recording their last LP for Vern Rumsey of Unwound's label, Punk in my Vitamins. Tours with Sebadoh, Karp, Unwound, Hovercraft, Caustic Resin, The Lies, Faith No More, and Chokebore helped gain them a national as well as international following.

== History ==
The band first formed in 1993 in Palm Desert, California by guitarist and vocalist Imaad Wasif and drummer Brian Girgus. Initially, Girgus played bass, however he switched to the drums when the group faced difficulty finding a drummer. The band issued their debut 7-inch single titled Two Songs in early 1994 through Punk in my Vitamins?, an independent label operated by Vern Rumsey, the bassist of Unwound. The duo followed this up with a second 7-inch single, Brass Tracks, which was issued in 1995 through X-Mas Records. That same year, the band was signed onto Amphetamine Reptile Records, who issued their debut full-length All Destructive Urges... Seem So Perfect on November 11, 1996. That same year, the band moved out to San Francisco, where they would stay until their disbandment in 2000.

After moving to San Francisco, the band began production for their next album, Kill the Lights. For this album, the duo recruited bassist Justin Halterlein. The album's production was rocky, for the trio did not get along well and tension began to build. Halterlein would leave the band soon after the release of the album on July 8, 1997. After the release of Kill the Lights, the group left Amphetamine Reptile amicably. For their next album, the duo recruited bassist Tiber Scheer, who previously performed in the band P.E.E. The group then released The Going Away Present through Punk in my Vitamins? on May 4, 1999, before their break-up in 2000.

The founding members of the band went on to various solo projects as well as playing in The Folk Implosion, Track Star, Yeah Yeah Yeahs, Wooden Shjips, and others. Wasif and Girgus currently reside in Los Angeles, while Scheer relocated to Chicago.

Lowercase reformed in January 2025, playing shows in California throughout the year

== Members ==
- Imaad Wasif – vocals and guitar (1993–2000)
- Brian Girgus – drums (1993–2000)
- Justin Halterlein – bass (1996–1997)
- Tiber Scheer – bass (1997–2000)
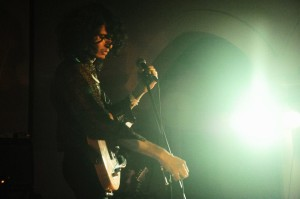
Imaad Wasif in performance some years after Lowercase disbanded

== Discography ==
Studio albums

- All Destructive Urges... Seem So Perfect (Amphetamine Reptile, 1996)
- Kill the Lights (Amphetamine Reptile, 1997)
- The Going Away Present (Punk in my Vitamins?, 1999)

Singles and EPs

- Two Songs (Punk in my Vitamins?, 1994)
- Brass Tracks (X-Mas, 1995)
- Cadence (Amphetamine Reptile, 1995)
- The Open Sea (Kill Rock Stars, 1998)
- Imbedded in Ice (Punk in my Vitamins?, 1999)
- Very Early Recordings (Self-released, 2020)

Compilations

- Aside and Besides: A Singles Compilation (Self-released, 2020)
