= The New Folk Implosion =

Studio album by The Folk Implosion
- Released: March 4, 2003
- Length: 42:53
- Label: iMusic
- Producer: Lou Barlow; Imaad Wasif; Russell Pollard; Wally Gagel; Mickey Petralia; Aaron Espinoza

The Folk Implosion chronology
One Part Lullaby (1999)	The New Folk Implosion (2003)

Singles from The New Folk Implosion
- 1. "Brand of Skin" Released: 2003; 2. "Pearl" Released: 2003

The New Folk Implosion is the fourth studio album by the Folk Implosion. It was released on iMusic in 2003. In Europe, it was released on Domino Recording Company. The album was the group's first release without co-founder John Davis.

A music video was released for "Brand of Skin", directed by The Brothers Chaps.

== Critical reception ==
Professional ratings
Aggregate scores
Source	Rating
Metacritic	57/100
Review scores
Source	Rating
AllMusic	2.5/5 stars
The Encyclopedia of Popular Music	2/5 stars
Pitchfork	4.6/10
The New Rolling Stone Album Guide	2/5 stars
Uncut	2/5 stars

At Metacritic, which assigns a weighted average score out of 100 to reviews from mainstream critics, the album received an average score of 57, based on 11 reviews, indicating "mixed or average reviews".

Exclaim! wrote that the album "features Barlow in fine voice and exploring the catchy guitar rock that's marked his career." Now wrote that "the grittier, guitar-heavy sound stands in contrast to "Natural One"'s slick hiphop slinkiness and One Part Lullaby’s multi-layered marriage of indie rock and electronica."

== Track listing ==
No.	Title	Lyrics	Music	Length
1.	"Fuse"	Lou Barlow	The Folk Implosion	4:49
2.	"Brand of Skin"	Barlow	The Folk Implosion	4:36
3.	"Pearl"	Barlow	Barlow	4:51
4.	"Releast"	Barlow; Imaad Wasif	The Folk Implosion	5:36
5.	"End of Henley"	Barlow; Wasif	The Folk Implosion	4:02
6.	"Coral"	Barlow; Wasif	The Folk Implosion	5:11
7.	"Leaving It Up to Me"	Barlow	The Folk Implosion	4:05
8.	"Creature of Salt"	Barlow	The Folk Implosion	5:01
9.	"Easy"	Barlow	Barlow	4:42
Total length:				42:53

== Personnel ==
Credits adapted from liner notes.

The Folk Implosion

- Lou Barlow – vocals, bass guitar, loop (2, 7), production, recording (2, 7), mixing (1–3, 5, 6, 9)
- Imaad Wasif – guitar, sitar (6), production, mixing (1–3, 5, 6, 9)
- Russell Pollard – drums, bass guitar (3, 9), vocals (9), production, mixing (1–3, 5, 6, 9)

Additional personnel

- Aaron Espinoza – piano (3, 5), recording (1, 3, 5, 6, 9), mixing (1, 3, 5, 6, 9)
- Mickey Petralia – production (4, 8), recording (4, 8), mixing (4, 8)
- Greg Kurstin – electric piano (4)
- David McConnell – mixing (1, 3, 9)
- Eddie Schreyer – mastering
- Carol Sheridan – photography
