= Everest (band) =

American rock band

- Origin: Los Angeles, California
- Genres: Rock, alternative rock, indie rock, folk rock, alternative country
- Years active: 2007–present
- Labels: Vapor Records, Warner Bros., ATO, MapleMusic (Canada)
- Members: Russell Pollard; Joel Graves; Elijah Thomson; Dan Bailey
- Past members: Jason Soda; Davey Latter; Rob Douglas; Aaron Lee Tasjan; Derek Brown; Kyle Crane, Byron Reynolds, Richard Gowen
- Website: everestband.com

Everest is a rock band from Los Angeles, California and Nashville, Tennessee, which consists of Russell Pollard (vocals, guitar, drums), Joel Graves (guitar, keyboards, vocals), Elijah Thomson (bass, vocals), and Dan Bailey (drums). The band released three acclaimed full-length albums respectively on Neil Young and Elliot Roberts's Vapor Records, Warner Bros. Records and ATO Records. The group toured extensively in the United States, Canada, Mexico and Europe with artists such as Neil Young, Wilco, My Morning Jacket, Death Cab for Cutie, Hayden, Minus the Bear and Young the Giant and more. The band performed on live national television broadcasts including Late Night with Conan O'Brien ("Rebels In The Roses", 2009), Late Night with Jimmy Fallon ("Let Go", 2010), Late Late Show with Craig Ferguson ("Let Go", 2011), and The Late Show With David Letterman ("Into The Grey", 2013).

== History ==
=== Everest EP and Ghost Notes (2007–2008) ===
In an interview with CityBeat, bassist Elijah Thomson explained the origin of band name: "Russ and Jason had named their studio Everest Recordings because of a pack of cigarettes that Geoff Emerick had. He was an engineer on a lot of the Beatles stuff and supposedly Abbey Road was originally going to be named Everest and they were going to do a photo shoot in Nepal. It became a logistical nightmare and, as the legend goes, Paul or somebody said, "Let’s shoot a picture out front and be done with it." So the name Everest has significance to them, however it is sort of a common thing for something to be named. It is hard to Google something like that. That is something you have to think about nowadays and maybe it gets lost in the shuffle a little bit."

The first record released by the band was the Everest EP, recorded at New Monkey Studio in the San Fernando Valley, California. It features the original Everest lineup with Rob Douglas on bass and Davey Latter on drums. Two of three songs from the EP were later featured on Everest's first full-length album.

The band's debut album, Ghost Notes, was recorded over a two-week period in August 2007 at New Monkey Studio. The album was produced, engineered and mixed by Foo Fighters producer Mike Terry. It was released in May 2008 through Vapor Records, a label owned by Neil Young.

=== On Approach (2010) ===
Everest's second album, titled On Approach, was recorded in a Cotati, California studio called Prairie Sun, which is a converted ex-chicken farm, with some additional recordings done at New Monkey Studio. It was produced by the band, engineered by Fritz Michaud, and mixed by Rob Schnapf at Sonora Recorders, Los Angeles. The album was released in May 2010 through Vapor Records and Warner Bros. Records.

=== Ownerless (2011–present) ===
In the beginning of 2011, the band was freed from a deal with Warner Bros. Records. Still slightly road-weary from touring to promote On Approach, they decided to regroup for their next album and teamed up with Richard Swift at National Freedom studios in Cottage Grove, Oregon. After several weeks of recording, the band returned to Los Angeles to work with producer Rob Schnapf, known for his work with Beck and Elliott Smith, to produce additional recording sessions for the record. The album was released on 26 June 2012 through ATO Records.

"This feels like the first real Everest record," said Russell Pollard about the album. "It’s the natural result of years of touring and spending time together. It’s the result of years of late night conversations about what kind of band we want to be and what kind of music we want to step onstage and play every night. It’s the sound of us finally hitting our stride."

In 2013, founding member Jason Soda decided to leave the band, and guitarist Aaron Lee Tasjan and drummer Dan Bailey joined the line-up. According to an update posted to the band's website in February 2015, Everest is on extended hiatus.

== Band members ==
Current members

- Russell Pollard – vocals, guitar, drums (2007–present)
- Joel Graves – guitar, keyboard, vocals (2007–present)
- Elijah Thomson – bass, vocals (2009–present)
- Dan Bailey – drums (2013–present)

Former members

- Jason Soda – guitar, keyboard, vocals (2007–2013)
- Davey Latter – drums, percussion (2007-2010/11)
- Rob Douglas – bass (2007–2009)
- Frank Lenz - drums

Touring members

- Derek Brown - drums
- Byron Reynolds - drums
- Richard Gowen - drums
- Kyle Crane – drums (2012)
- Bo Koster – keyboards

== Discography ==
=== Studio albums ===
Title	Album details
Ghost Notes	Released: 5 May 2008; Label: Vapor; Formats: CD, LP, digital download
On Approach	Released: 20 April 2010; Label: Vapor/Warner Bros.; Formats: CD, LP, digital download
Ownerless	Released: 26 June 2012; Label: Vapor/ATO Records; Formats: CD, LP, digital download

=== Extended plays ===
Title	Album details
Everest	Released: 2008; Label: Self-released; Formats: CD, LP
Who the Hell Is Everest?	Released: 21 March 2012; Label: ATO Records; Formats: digital download

=== Singles ===
Single	Year	Album
"Let Go"	2010	On Approach

== Music videos ==
Song	Year	Album	Director(s)
"Rebels in the Roses"	2008	Ghost Notes	Lance Alton Troxel
"Let Go"	2010	On Approach	The General Assembly
"Ownerless"	2012	Ownerless	The General Assembly
