= All Dressed in Love =

Song by Jennifer Hudson

from the album Sex and the City: Original Motion Picture Soundtrack and Jennifer Hudson
- Released: May 26, 2008
- Recorded: 2008
- Genre: R&B; soul; disco
- Length: 3:23
- Label: New Line
- Songwriters: Cee Lo Green; Jack Splash; Salaam Remi
- Producers: Salaam Remi; Jack Splash

"All Dressed in Love" is a song written by Gnarls Barkley's Cee-Lo, Jack Splash (from the group Plantlife) and Salaam Remi and recorded by Jennifer Hudson for Sex and the City: The Movie. Despite not being released as a single, the song debuted at number 72 on the UK Singles Chart on the strength of paid downloads alone.

The songs appears in the film's closing moments as the characters celebrate Samantha's 50th birthday.

== Charts ==
=== Weekly charts ===
Chart (2008–09)	Peak position
Hungary (Rádiós Top 40)	11
Japan (Japan Hot 100)	99
UK Singles (OCC)	72

=== Year-end charts ===
Chart (2009)	Position
Hungarian Singles Chart	56
