= Just a Ride =

2005 single by Jem

Single by Jem

from the album Finally Woken
- Released: 13 June 2005
- Genre: Pop
- Label: ATO Records, Crazy Wise Music
- Songwriter(s): Jem, Mike Caren
- Producer(s): Jem, Yoad Nevo, Ge-ology

Jem singles chronology
"They" (2005)	"Just a Ride" (2005)	"Wish I" (2005)

"Just a Ride" is the second single released by Jem from her debut album Finally Woken. The song was featured on Music from the OC: Mix 1, along with "Maybe I'm Amazed" (a cover of the Paul McCartney song).

"Just a Ride" is also featured on the soundtracks of Monster-in-Law (2005) and The Prince and Me (2004).

== Track listing ==
=== Just a Ride Pt. 1 ===
1. Just a Ride
2. California Sun

=== Just a Ride Pt. 2 ===
1. Just a Ride
2. Just a Ride (Fatboy Slim Remix)
3. Just a Ride (Adam F-V-Pendulum Music Mix)
4. They (Kid Freeze Tech Breaks Mix)

== Music video ==
The music video starts with a boy skateboarding down the street, and he knocks down a garbage can sending it everywhere. Jem walks out the door carrying boxes, and slips on the garbage. The ground suddenly turns into a pool as she falls, and then she starts to sing. Another woman is peacefully reading a book, while she waits for the butler to bring her a drink. The man comes, then trips, spilling the drink all over her. She then takes her housecoat off, revealing her swimsuit which suddenly changes into Jem removing her jacket at a bar. There is a couple that starts to argue, and then, there is scenes of Jem riding in the backseat of a taxi. The driver of the taxi keeps yelling, and Jem gets out of the car. The video goes back to Jem falling into the pool, but then it reveals that she just fell on the ground, and a man gives her a hand up.

== Charts ==
Chart (2005)	Peak position
Belgium (Ultratop 50 Wallonia)	66
Hungary (Rádiós Top 40)	16
Ireland (IRMA)	27
Scotland (OCC)	18
UK Singles (OCC)	16
UK Indie (OCC)	36
