= Another Collection of Home Recordings =

Studio album by Lou Barlow
- Released: 1994
- Genre: Folk rock, lo-fi
- Label: Mint Records - MRS-010

Lou Barlow chronology
Winning Losers: A Collection of Home Recordings 89-93 (1994)	Another Collection of Home Recordings (1994)	Songs from Loobiecore (2002)

Another Collection of Home Recordings is the fifth music album by American rock musician Lou Barlow, released as "Lou Barlow And Friends" in 1994 in the United States (CD) and Canada (double 7") by Mint Records.

== Track listing ==
All tracks are written by Lou Barlow, except where noted.

No.	Title	Writer(s)	Length
1.	"Run To You"	Bryan Adams, Jim Vallance	2:38
2.	"Puffin"	Bob Fay	1:01
3.	"Queen of the Scene"	Kathleen Billus	1:41
4.	"Blonde in the Bleachers"	Joni Mitchell	1:59
5.	"What Would It Be Like"		2:04
6.	"Feel Good"		1:37
7.	"Symbiosis"		1:15
8.	"Option"		0:44
9.	"Alone to Decide"		1:12
10.	"Cranky"		1:19
11.	"Machinery"		1:38
12.	"Synthstrument"		2:01
Total length:			16:31
