= Wasted Pieces =

Studio album by Lou Barlow
- Released: 1993
- Recorded: home-recorded album
- Genre: Folk rock, lo-fi
- Label: Shrimper - SHR 48

Lou Barlow chronology
Most of the WORST and Some of the Best of Sentridoh (1992)	Wasted Pieces (1993)	Winning Losers: A Collection of Home Recordings 89-93 (1993)

Wasted Pieces is the third solo album released by Lou Barlow as "Lou B's Acoustic Sentridoh"; "Sentridoh" is his solo home recording project; it was released by Shrimper Records in 1993 as cassette; in 2003 it was re-released as CD as "Lou B's Wasted Pieces '87-'93" that collects the bulk of the tracks from Wasted Pieces and Most of the Worst and Some of the Best tapes.

== Track listing ==
=== 1993 cassette release ===
All tracks are written by Lou Barlow.

Side one
No.	Title	Length
1.	"Pooh Piece"
2.	"Stiff To The Rhythm"
3.	"Broken II"
4.	"Be Nice Me"
5.	"Never Tried"
6.	"My Head Really Hurts (Part 3)"
7.	"God Won't Let You Die"
8.	"Saliva Drips"
9.	"Abandon"
10.	"No Way At All"
11.	"I Know Before"

Side two
No.	Title	Length
1.	"It Might Be"
2.	"Old Man"
3.	"Raise Your Head"
4.	"Brown Confessin'"
5.	"Raise The Bells"
6.	"Conspiracy"
7.	"Fun-pool"
8.	"Why We Swing"
9.	"Nothing Lasts"
10.	"Heartness Crane"
11.	"Organ"
12.	"Cello"

=== 2003 CD release ===
1. Pooh Piece - 02:56
2. Stiff To Rhythm - 01:06
3. Broken II - 02:08
4. Untitled - 01:30
5. Nitemare - 01:59
6. Untitled - 00:47
7. Be Nice Me - 01:25
8. Never Tried - 01:45
9. J.O.J. '91 - 01:42
10. Rather Die - 01:15
11. God Won't Let You Die - 01:10
12. Saliva Drips - 01:37
13. Albuquerque '89 - 01:38
14. Abandon - 00:35
15. No Way At All - 01:44
16. I Know Before... - 02:54
17. It Might Be - 01:00
18. Old Man - 01:04
19. I Can't Wait - 01:57
20. Suede - 01:13
21. Raise Your Head - 02:25
22. Raise The Bells - 02:09
23. Conspiracy - 01:14
24. Untitled - 00:36
25. Fun-pool - 00:20
26. Why We Swing - 00:37
27. Nothing Lasts - 02:43
28. Heartness Crane - 01:52
29. Organ - 02:25
30. Cello - 01:05
31. End - 01:04
