= Kids (film) =

1995 film by Larry Clark

- Theatrical release poster
- Directed by: Larry Clark
- Written by: Harmony Korine
- Produced by: Cary Woods
- Starring: Leo Fitzpatrick; Justin Pierce; Chloë Sevigny
- Cinematography: Eric Edwards
- Edited by: Christopher Tellefsen
- Music by: Lou Barlow; John Davis
- Production companies: Independent Pictures; The Guys Upstairs; Killer Films; Shining Excalibur Films; Kids NY Limited
- Distributed by: Shining Excalibur Films
- Release dates: May 17, 1995 (Cannes); July 21, 1995 (United States)
- Running time: 91 minutes
- Country: United States
- Language: English
- Budget: $1.5 million
- Box office: $20.4 million

Kids is a 1995 American independent teen drama film directed by Larry Clark and written by Harmony Korine in their directorial and screenwriting debuts, respectively. It stars Leo Fitzpatrick, Justin Pierce and Chloë Sevigny in their film debuts. Fitzpatrick, Pierce, Sevigny, and other newcomers including Rosario Dawson portray a group of teenagers in New York City. They are characterized as libertines, who engage in sexual acts and recreational substance abuse, over the course of a single day.

Ben Detrick of the New York Times has described the film as "Lord of the Flies with skateboards, nitrous oxide and hip-hop... There is no thunderous moral reckoning, only observational detachment." The MPAA initially assigned Kids an NC-17 rating, but distributor Miramax Films declined to release it with that classification and instead distributed the film unrated through its shell company Shining Excalibur Films to avoid the commercial restrictions associated with the NC-17 label. Critical response was mixed, and the film grossed $20.4 million on a $1.5 million budget. It is now considered a cult classic.

== Plot ==
Telly and a 12-year-old girl are making out on a bed. With no adults around, Telly, who is a scrawny 16-year-old, talks with the girl, a virgin, and they have sex. Afterwards, he meets his best friend, Casper, and they talk about his sexual experience. Telly has taken to only having sex with virgins. They then enter a local store, where Casper shoplifts a 40 oz bottle of malt liquor and on the way out Casper steals two peaches from a Korean fruit vendor. Looking for drugs, food, and a place to hang out, they head to their friend Paul's apartment despite disliking him. As Telly and Casper sit down, they watch skaters on the TV and Casper does a whippet. As time goes on, they join the other boys in boasting about their sexual prowess and nonchalant attitudes to unprotected sex and venereal diseases.

Across the city, a group of girls are talking about sex. Their attitudes contrast with those of the boys on many topics, particularly fellatio and the significance of the individuals to whom they lost their virginity. During one conversation the boys are talking about how they don't use condoms and another boy says that there is no such thing as AIDS and HIV. Two of the girls, Ruby and Jennie, mention that they were recently tested for STDs: Ruby tests negative, even though she has had multiple sexual encounters; Jennie tests positive for HIV. She tells the nurse that she has had sex only once, with Telly. Distraught, she tries to find him to prevent him from passing HIV on to another girl. Meanwhile, Telly and Casper walk to Telly's house and steal money from his mother.

After purchasing marijuana from a Rastafarian drug dealer, they gather with a few friends and, together, taunt a gay couple passing by. As Casper rides on a skateboard, he carelessly bumps into a man who angrily threatens and pushes him. The man is struck in the back of the head with a skateboard by Casper's friend Harold, causing him to collapse. Several other skaters join in, beating the man until he is rendered unconscious by a final blow to the head by Casper. Jennie is then seen in a cab and the taxi driver gives her advice on how to be happy.

Telly and some of the skaters then pick up a 13-year-old girl named Darcy—the virginal younger sister of an acquaintance—with whom Telly wants to have sex, but Darcy shows restraint. The group sneaks into a pool and go swimming with a few more friends as Harold showboats his genitals to the others. Afterward, the group goes to an unsupervised party at the house of their friend Steven.

Jennie meets Misha, a girl who dislikes Casper and notes Telly's possible whereabouts at The Shelter. When Jennie arrives at the club, she runs into a boy named Fidget. The two go into a backroom and witness a person making out with three girls at the same time; while they watch, Fidget shoves a pill into Jennie's mouth. Jennie learns Telly is at Steven's house. On the way there, she drifts in and out of consciousness due to the effects of the pill.

Telly is later seen in Steven's parents' room asking Darcy to have sex with him. Jennie arrives at the house and finds Casper drunk and singing nonsense. He tells Jennie where Telly is. Jennie witnesses Telly having sex with Darcy, who is crying out in pain. Visibly numb, Jennie does not intervene, allowing Telly to expose Darcy to HIV. Jennie cries and passes out among the other partygoers.

In the morning a still inebriated Casper begins to rape an also inebriated and unconscious Jennie, unwittingly exposing himself to HIV. After a montage shows homeless people, drug users, and pedestrians in New York City, a voiceover by Telly says that sex is the only worthwhile thing he has in his life and without it he has nothing. Casper wakes up naked on the couch and says, "Jesus Christ, what happened?"

== Cast ==
- Leo Fitzpatrick as Telly
- Justin Pierce as Casper
- Chloë Sevigny as Jennie
- Rosario Dawson as Ruby Forman
- Yakira Peguero as Darcy
- Atabey Rodriguez as Misha
- Jon Abrahams as Steven
- Harold Hunter as Harold
- Sajan Bhagat as Paul
- Hamilton Harris as Hamilton

Sarah Henderson portrays the first girl Telly is seen having sex with. Tony Morales and Walter Youngblood portray the gay couple. Julie Stebe-Glorius and Christiana Stebe-Glorius appear as Telly's mother and younger brother, respectively. The Rastafari is played by an actor credited as "Dr. Henry". Screenwriter Harmony Korine has an uncredited appearance as Fidget.

== Production ==
I wanted to present the way kids see things, but without all this baggage, this morality that these old middle aged Hollywood guys bring to it. Kids don't think that way...they're living in the moment not thinking about anything beyond that and that's what I wanted to catch.

— Larry Clark

Larry Clark said that he wanted to "make the Great American Teenage Movie, like the Great American Novel." The film is shot in a quasi-documentary style, although all of its scenes are scripted.

In Kids, Clark cast New York City "street" kids with no previous acting experience, notably Leo Fitzpatrick (Telly) and Justin Pierce (Casper). Clark originally decided he wanted to cast Fitzpatrick in a film after watching him skateboard in New York, and cursing when he could not land certain tricks. Korine had met Chloë Sevigny in New York before production began on Kids, and initially cast her in a small role as one of the girls in the swimming pool. She was given the leading role of Jennie after Mia Kirshner, the original actress cast, was deemed not the right fit to work with first-time actors. Clark had stated he was alright with the experienced Kirshner playing Jennie, as Jennie was not a real "character." After being dismissed from the film, Kirshner's lawyer told co-producer Lauren Zalaznick that Mike Ovitz would call her in protest of Kirshner's firing, who ultimately never did. Sevigny and Korine went on to make Gummo (1997) and Julien Donkey-Boy (1999) together. Korine makes a cameo in the club scene with Jennie, as the kid wearing Coke-bottle glasses and a Nuclear Assault shirt who gives her drugs, though the part is credited to his brother Avi. The minor characters proved harder to cast than the main cast. Clark and Korine were insistent on casting both an actual double amputee and a nursing woman as Telly's mother, but could not find a ten-year-old to play Casper in a flashback scene.

Korine reportedly wrote the film's screenplay in 1992, at the age of 19, and principal photography took place during the summer of 1994. Contrary to the perception of many viewers, the film, according to Korine, was almost entirely scripted, with the only exception being the scene with Casper on the couch at the end, which was improvised. Gus Van Sant had been attached to the film as a producer. After insufficient interest had been generated in the film, he left the project. Under incoming producer Cary Woods, the project found sufficient independent funding for the film. Harvey Weinstein of Miramax Films, wary of parent The Walt Disney Company's opinion of the risky screenplay, declined to involve Disney in funding the production of the film. After Woods showed him the final cut, Miramax Films paid $3.5 million to buy the worldwide distribution rights of this film.

== Release ==
Miramax Films, which was owned by The Walt Disney Company, paid $3.5 million for the worldwide distribution rights. Later, Harvey and Bob Weinstein, co-chairmen of Miramax Films, were forced to buy back the film from Disney and created Shining Excalibur Films, a one-off company, to release the film, due to Disney's policy, that at the time, forbid the release of NC-17 rated films, and their appeal to the MPAA to lower it to an R rating was denied. Eamonn Bowles was hired to be the chief operating officer of Shining Excalibur Films.

== Reception ==
=== Box office ===
The film, which cost $1.5 million to produce, grossed $7.4 million in the North American box office and $20 million worldwide. According to Peter Biskind's book Down and Dirty Pictures, Eamonn Bowles had stated that Harvey and Bob Weinstein might have personally profited up to $2 million each.

=== Critical reception ===
The film received mixed to favorable reviews from critics. On Rotten Tomatoes, the film has an approval rating of 47% based on 57 critic's reviews, with an average rating of 5.8/10. The site's consensus reads, "Kids isn't afraid to test viewers' limits, but the point of its nearly non-stop provocation is likely to be lost in all the repellent characters and unpleasant imagery". On Metacritic, the film has a score of 63 out of 100 based on reviews from 18 critics, indicating "generally favorable" reviews.

The film was championed by some prominent critics, including Roger Ebert of the Chicago Sun-Times, who gave the film three and a half out of four stars. "Kids is the kind of movie that needs to be talked about afterward. It doesn't tell us what it means. Sure, it has a 'message', involving safe sex. But safe sex is not going to civilize these kids, make them into curious, capable citizens. What you realize, thinking about Telly, is that life has given him nothing that interests him, except for sex, drugs and skateboards. His life is a kind of hell, briefly interrupted by orgasms."

Janet Maslin of The New York Times called the film a "wake-up call to the modern world" about the nature of present-day youth in urban life. She added it is also "an extremely difficult film to sit through, with an emphasis on societal disintegration and adolescent selfishness at its most sordid", and that some viewers will find issue with Clark's lack of judgment on the events depicted. Some critics labeled it exploitative, describing it as borderline "child pornography".

Other critics derided the film, with the most common criticism relating to the perceived lack of artistic merit. The Washington Post's Desson Thomson said, "Ostensibly about the banality of youthful evil, 'Kids' is simply about its own banality. At best, it's a misplaced aesthetic experiment. At worst, it's glossy exploitation—with enough controversy to launch a thousand trite radio and television talk shows."

Feminist scholar bell hooks spoke extensively about the film in Cultural Criticism and Transformation: "Kids fascinated me as a film precisely because when you heard about it, it seemed like the perfect embodiment of postmodern notions of journeying and dislocation and fragmentation, and yet when you go to see it, it has simply such a conservative take on gender, on race, on the politics of HIV."

In a 2016 retrospective essay about the film, writer Moira Weigel discussed the film's impact at the time of its release and legacy. She acknowledged that the film "nails many of the ethnographic details of teen life in New York in the Nineties". However, she commented on the film's depiction of HIV, writing:

"Watching it today, I was hoping for an account of the ways that the fear of AIDS shaped how young people in that time and place learned about desire. Instead the film recasts the virus into the threat lurking in the background of a kind of nightmare fairy tale...Rather than exploring how it shaped, and unmade, lives, it reduces the disease to one more slick bit of style, something to add suspense where the film might otherwise risk aimlessness and to heighten the aura of transgression. While it manages to capture the sense, instilled in us by our health teachers, that disease and death would be the price of desire, it does little more than that. Instead of examining the myths that loomed over the teen minds of that era, it enlarges them".

=== Accolades ===
Year	Award	Category	Recipients	Result	Ref.
May 1995	Cannes Film Festival	Palme d'Or	Larry Clark	Nominated	
May 1995	Cannes Film Festival	Golden Camera	Larry Clark	Nominated	
1996	Stinkers Bad Movie Awards	Worst Picture	Kids (Shining Excalibur)	Dishonourable Mention	
March 23, 1996	Independent Spirit Awards	Best Supporting Female	Chloë Sevigny	Nominated	
March 23, 1996	Independent Spirit Awards	Best First Screenplay	Harmony Korine	Nominated	
March 23, 1996	Independent Spirit Awards	Best First Feature	Kids (Shining Excalibur)	Nominated	
March 23, 1996	Independent Spirit Awards	Best Debut Performance	Justin Pierce	Won	

AFI's 100 Years...100 Heroes and Villains

- Telly - Nominated Villain

== Documentary ==
The documentary We Were Once Kids was released in 2021. Directed by Eddie Martin, it explores the film's production, as well as the post-film lives of some of the cast. At the time of filming Kids, most of the participating teenagers signed a contract without knowledge about their rights and were left on their own after filming ended. The documentary was awarded for Best Editing at the Tribeca Film Festival.

== In popular culture ==
The Adam and Joe Show S1E04 featured a "Toymovie" parody of Kids, titled "Toys".

In the Eminem song "Guilty Conscience" (1999), Dr. Dre exclaims, "Man, ain't you ever seen that one movie Kids?" The lyric appears in the second verse, a vignette in which Dr. Dre and Eminem weigh in on a man contemplating date rape.

Metalcore band Emmure has a song titled "I Thought You Met Telly and Turned Me into Casper" in their 2009 album Felony. The song is about a guy who is afraid he might have contracted an STI from a previous partner and is hoping to be negative after getting tested – "Please God, please God. Let me be negative."

In August 2010, American rapper Mac Miller released the mixtape K.I.D.S., and its cover art, title, and some musical themes pay homage to the film. Some audio clips from the film are also part of the mixtape in between songs.

On the film's twentieth anniversary in 2015, skateboarding brand Supreme launched a capsule collection commemorating the film. Actors Justin Pierce and Harold Hunter had been involved with Supreme since its incarnation and were part of the brand's original skate team.

== Soundtrack ==
Kids Original Soundtrack

Soundtrack album by Various artists
- Released: 1995
- Genres: Indie rock; lo-fi
- Length: 41:16
- Label: London
- Producers: Brian Beattie; Randall Poster; Tim O'Heir

Singles from Kids Original Soundtrack
- 1. "Natural One" Released: November 21, 1995

The soundtrack was released in 1995.

In September 2023, Folk Implosion, the band composed of Lou Barlow and John Davis, released Music For Kids, a compilation of songs from the film, many of which had never been released for streaming, and others that had since become unavailable due to licensing issues. The album included songs that did not make the final cut, and alternate versions of the material present in the film.

Professional ratings
Review scores
Source	Rating
AllMusic	4.5/5 stars
Entertainment Weekly	A
NME	7/10
Spin	8/10

Creation of the film's soundtrack was overseen by Barlow.

1. Daniel Johnston – "Casper"
2. Deluxx Folk Implosion – "Daddy Never Understood"
3. Folk Implosion – "Nothing Gonna Stop"
4. Folk Implosion – "Jenny's Theme"
5. Folk Implosion – "Simean Groove"
6. Daniel Johnston – "Casper the Friendly Ghost"
7. Folk Implosion – "Natural One"
8. Sebadoh – "Spoiled"
9. Folk Implosion – "Crash"
10. Folk Implosion – "Wet Stuff"
11. Lo-Down – "Mad Fright Night"
12. Folk Implosion – "Raise the Bells"
13. Slint – "Good Morning, Captain"

== Works cited ==
- Hynes, Eric (July 16, 2015). "'Kids': The History of the 1990s' Most Controversial Film". Rolling Stone. Archived from the original on August 18, 2020.
