= Down to Earth (Jem album) =

Studio album by Jem
- Released: 16 September 2008
- Recorded: 2006–2008
- Studios: Detroit and Los Angeles
- Genres: Trip hop; pop; Electronica
- Length: 47:18
- Languages: English; Spanish; Japanese
- Label: ATO
- Producers: Greg Kurstin; Lester Mendez; Jeff Bass; Mike Bradford

Jem chronology
Finally Woken (2004)	Down to Earth (2008)	Beachwood Canyon (2016)

Singles from Down to Earth
- 1. "It's Amazing" Released: 3 June 2008; 2. "Crazy" Released: 26 August 2008; 3. "And So I Pray" Released: 26 May 2009; 4. "I Want You To..." Released: 26 October 2009

Professional ratings
Aggregate scores
Source	Rating
Metacritic	54/100
Review scores
Source	Rating
AllMusic	3/5 stars
ArtofRhyme	3.75/5
Billboard	(positive)
Digital Spy	2/5 stars
The Guardian	3/5 stars
MusicOMH	2/5 stars
Paste	6.1/10
The Phoenix	2.5/4 stars
The Times	2/5 stars

Down to Earth is the second studio album by Welsh musician Jem, the follow-up to Finally Woken. The first single, "It's Amazing", was featured on the soundtrack to the Sex and the City movie. The album spawned four singles.

The press release states that Jem co-wrote the album with a variety of people including Jeff Bass, Lester Mendez and Greg Kurstin and sings in Japanese on the track, "Aciiid!". The album also includes a collaboration with South African singer-songwriter and poet-activist Vusi Mahlasela on the track "You Will Make It" which was dedicated to the memory of D12 member Proof. Although the collaboration never happened, Jem wanted to work with Eminem for the song, saying "The track is about losing someone and I wrote it the day after his friend Proof was murdered. I was in Detroit with Eminem's friends, who I happened to be recording with, when it happened".

== Critical reception ==
Down to Earth was met with "mixed or average" reviews from critics. At Metacritic, which assigns a weighted average rating out of 100 to reviews from mainstream publications, this release received an average score of 54 based on 7 reviews.

In a review for AllMusic, critic reviewer Andrew Leahey wrote: "Down to Earth's title depicts Jem as a grounded musician, but its wide-ranging sound suggests something different, as the singer has yet to find a style that fully suits her capabilities."

== Track listing ==
Down to Earth track listing
No.	Title	Writer(s)	Producer(s)	Length
1.	"Down to Earth"	Jem Griffiths; Jeff Bass; Justin Griffiths	Bass	4:33
2.	"Crazy"	Jem; Bass	Bass	3:39
3.	"I Want You To..."	Jem; Lester Mendez; Cut Chemist	Mendez	3:38
4.	"It's Amazing"	Jem; Mendez	Mendez	3:58
5.	"Keep on Walking"	Jem; Bass	Bass	4:12
6.	"You Will Make It (featuring Vusi Mahlasela)"	Jem; J. Griffiths	Mike Bradford	6:11
7.	"I Always Knew"	Jem; Mendez	Mendez	3:09
8.	"Got It Good"	Jem; Bass	Bass	4:26
9.	"Aciiid!"	Jem; Greg Kurstin	Kurstin	2:56
10.	"How Would You Like It"	Jem; J. Griffiths	Bradford	4:02
11.	"And So I Pray"	Jem; Kevin Beber	Bradford	2:42
12.	"On Top of the World"	Jem; Mendez	Mendez	4:52
Total length:				47:18

iTunes bonus track
No.	Title	Writer(s)	Length
13.	"Forever and a Day"	Jem; J. Griffiths; Joseph George	3:49

== Personnel ==
- Hiroko Aoyagi – vocals
- Jeff Atmajian – piano, string arrangements, piano arrangement
- Jeff Bass – bass, guitar, keyboards, producer, drum programming, tracked by
- Kevin Beber – drum programming
- Brian Berryman – engineer, fader engineer
- Mick Bolger – trombone, trumpet, euphonium, mellophonium, E flat cornet
- Mike Bradford – producer, string arrangements, instrumentation
- Del Casher – sounds
- Bryan Cook – engineer
- Nick Cuchinella – trombone
- Nabil Elderkin – photography
- Johnny Evans – saxophone
- Serban Ghenea – mixing
- Jem Griffiths – vocals, producer, vocal engineer, poetry reading
- Justin Griffiths – acoustic guitar
- John Hanes – mixing
- Mark Aaron James – design
- Ted Jensen – mastering
- Shinobu Lee – vocals
- David Levita – acoustic guitar, guitar
- Lester Mendez – piano, producer, string arrangements, brass arrangement, instrumentation
- Monica Mendez – sound design
- Milan, Derrick & The Krew – chorus
- Eddie Miller – vocal engineer
- Rafael Padilla – percussion
- Phillip Ramos – studio assistant
- Tim Roberts – mixing assistant
- Ken Robinson – trumpet
- Sonus – strings
- Welsh Choir of Southern California – chorus
- Joe Wohlmuth – engineer

== Charts ==
Chart performance for Down to Earth
Chart (2008)	Peak position
US Billboard 200	48
Chart (2009)	Peak position
UK Albums Chart	64

== Release history ==
Release history for Down to Earth
Country	Date
United States	16 September 2008
Canada	16 September 2008
Japan	16 September 2008
Ireland	30 January 2009
United Kingdom	2 February 2009
Europe	2 February 2009
Sweden	4 February 2009
Portugal	16 February 2009
Poland	16 February 2009
Denmark	23 February 2009
Germany	27 February 2009
Austria	27 February 2009
Netherlands	27 February 2009
Switzerland	27 February 2009
Norway	2 March 2009
France	3 March 2009
Finland	4 March 2009
Greece	6 March 2009
Italy	20 March 2009 (Note: Italy's release was originally planned for 6 march 2009, as announced on Jem's official MySpace, but it was later postponed.)
