= Winning Losers: A Collection of Home Recordings 89-93 =

Studio album by Lou Barlow
- Released: 1994
- Studio: home-recorded album
- Genre: Folk rock, lo-fi
- Label: Smells Like Records - SLR 8

Lou Barlow chronology
Lou B's Wasted Pieces '87 - '93 (1993)	Winning Losers: A Collection of Home Recordings 89-93 (1994)	Another Collection of Home Recordings (1994)

Winning Losers: A Collection of Home Recordings 89-93 is an album by Lou Barlow, released as Louis Barlow's Acoustic Sentridoh in 1994 in the United States by Smells Like Records.

== Critical reception ==
Professional ratings
Review scores
Source	Rating
AllMusic	4.5/5 stars
Rolling Stone	4/5 stars

Rolling Stone deemed the album "nervously sweet hearth rock with strong madcap echoes of Syd Barrett." A later review in Rolling Stone, by Mark Kemp, wrote that "if you can take the occasional overpowering distortion, the emotional rewards are devastating." The New York Times called it "a benchmark of the [home recording] genre."

== Track listing ==
All tracks are written by Lou Barlow.

Side one
No.	Title	Length
1.	"Stronger"	02:27
2.	"Chokechain"	03:08
3.	"Only Losers"	02:04(*)
4.	"Breakdown Day"	02:18(*)
5.	"Rise Below Slowly"	01:43(*)

Side two
No.	Title	Length
1.	"Dragdown Memory"	03:20
2.	"Not Nice To Be Nice"	01:46
3.	"Mellow, Cool, And Painfully Aware"	02:15(*)
4.	"Crackers And Coffee"	01:25
5.	"High School"	02:43

(*) originally appeared on Losers, a Sentridoh cassette released by Shrimper.
