= Ten Years On: A Collection of Songs in Remembrance of September 11th 2001 =

Compilation album by Various
- Released: 2011

Ten Years On: A Collection of Songs in Remembrance of September 11th 2001, or simply Ten Years On, is a tribute album created by Welsh singer-songwriter and record producer Jem to commemorate the tenth anniversary of the September 11 attacks. Money raised from sales of the album on iTunes was donated to the National September 11 Memorial & Museum.

== Track listing ==
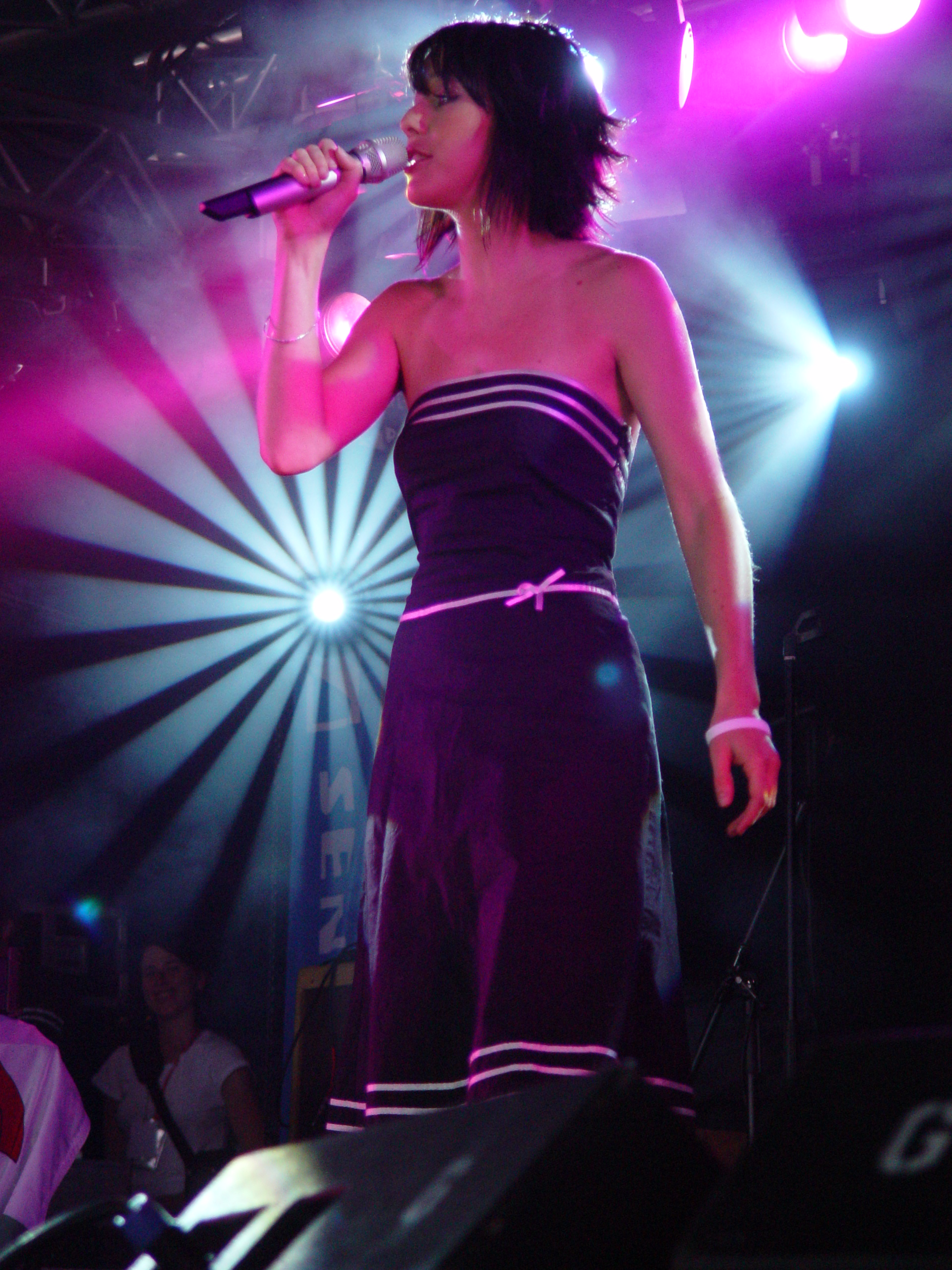
Jem performing in 2005

1. "Adagio for Strings" – Leonard Bernstein & New York Philharmonic
2. "Imagine" – John Lennon
3. "New York City" – Suzzy & Maggie Roche
4. "Dear Old Friend" – Patty Griffin
5. "On the Turning Away" – Pink Floyd
6. "Every Grain of Sand" – Bob Dylan
7. "Pride (In the Name of Love)" – John Legend
8. "You Will Make It" – Jem feat. Vusi Mahlasela
9. "That I Would Be Good" – Alanis Morissette
10. "Time After Time" – Cyndi Lauper feat. Sarah McLachlan
11. "Sister (Live at Radio City)" – Dave Matthews & Tim Reynolds
12. "You and I" – Stevie Wonder
13. "I Know You By Heart" – Eva Cassidy
14. "Help Me" – Johnny Cash
15. "If I Rise" – Dido & A.R. Rahman
16. "Bridge over Troubled Water" – Simon & Garfunkel
17. "Gold Dust" – Tori Amos
18. "Good Night, New York" – Nanci Griffith
19. "You'll Never Walk Alone" – Nina Simone

== See also ==
- List of cultural references to the September 11 attacks
- List of tribute albums
- Memorials and services for the September 11 attacks
