= The Going Away Present =

Studio album by Lowercase
- Released: May 4, 1999
- Recorded: Late 1998 at Louder Studios, Los Angeles
- Genre: Post-hardcore, slowcore, indie rock
- Length: 49:12
- Label: Punk In My Vitamins
- Producer: Tim Green

Lowercase chronology
Kill the Lights (1997)	The Going Away Present (1999)

Professional ratings
Review scores
Source	Rating
AllMusic	4/5 stars
The Stanford Daily	4.5/5 stars

The Going Away Present is the third and final studio album by Lowercase, released on May 4, 1999 through Punk In My Vitamins.

== Track listing ==
No.	Title	Length
1.	"Floodlit"	6:08
2.	"Willing To Follow You Down"	5:41
3.	"The Going Away Present"	3:50
4.	"Glisten To The Pink"	6:55
5.	"The Open Sea"	3:51
6.	"On A Bender"	4:40
7.	"Last Stand"	6:20
8.	"Thistrainwillnotstop"	11:47

== Personnel ==
- Imaad Wasif - vocals, guitar
- Brian Girgus - drums
- Tiber Scheer - bass
- Tim Green - production, recording, guitar, keyboards
- Pat Whalen - artwork
- Andee Connors - layout
- Jill Wooster - layout

== Release history ==
Region	Date	Label	Format	Catalog
United States	1999	Punk In My Vitamins?	CD, LP	PNMV16
