= Imaad Wasif (album) =

Studio album by Imaad Wasif
- Released: 11 April 2006
- Genre: Alternative rock, acoustic
- Length: 35:02
- Label: Kill Rock Stars
- Producer: Mark Nevers

Imaad Wasif chronology
Imaad Wasif (2006)	Strange Hexes (2008)

Professional ratings
Aggregate scores
Source	Rating
Metacritic	56/100 link
Review scores
Source	Rating
Pitchfork	(6.5/10) link
AllMusic	link

Imaad Wasif is the first solo album by the Los Angeles–based songwriter Imaad Wasif, released in 2006. The album was recorded in Nashville, taking only a week and a day, and was produced by Mark Nevers. Wasif toured in support of the album as the opening act for the Yeah Yeah Yeahs in 2006 and 2007.

== Track listing ==
1. Spark – 2:39
2. Out In the Black – 2:37
3. Whisper – 3:33
4. Into the Static – 2:41
5. Fade in Me – 3:35
6. Isolation – 2:27
7. Blade – 2:31
8. Coil – 2:49
9. Without – 4:44
10. (Dandelion) – 4:47
11. Tomorrow Is Ours – 2:48
