= Grim Tower =

- Genres: Psychedelic rock, folk rock, experimental rock
- Years active: 2010–present
- Members: Imaad Wasif; Stephen McBean; Rob Barbato; Daniel Allaire

Grim Tower is a collaboration between Imaad Wasif and Stephen McBean's "Death Folk" songs written from an exploration into detunings on acoustic guitars. A full-length album entitled Anarchic Breezes is slated for a 2012 release. The 10 song album was recorded in Los Angeles, California, at House of Pie & the Committee HQ by Stephen McBean and Rob Campanella and mixed by Mark Nevers in Nashville, Tennessee, at Beech House Studios.
