= Strange Hexes =

Studio album by Imaad Wasif
- Released: 18 March 2008
- Genre: Alternative rock
- Length: 47:56
- Label: Self released

Imaad Wasif chronology
Imaad Wasif (2006)	Strange Hexes (2008)	The Voidist (2009)

Professional ratings
Review scores
Source	Rating
Pitchfork Media	4.6/10
Tiny Mix Tapes	2/5 stars

Strange Hexes is the second album by Imaad Wasif. It was self-released in 2008. It was recorded with his backing band, Two Part Beast.

== Critical reception ==
Variety wrote that "Wasif explores rich guitar-based psychedelic pop that’s less introspective and slightly heavier than the songs found on his 2005 self-titled debut." LA Weekly called the record "an unabashed rock record, with hints of classic rock, prog and post-punk underscoring Wasif’s euphonious vocal melodies and fascination with the spiritual." The Dallas Observer called it "a great collection of psychedelic folk rock that recalls Dylan fronting Black Sabbath with Ravi Shankar producing."

== Track listing ==
1. Wanderlusting – 4:53
2. Unveiling – 5:38
3. Halcyon – 3:32
4. Oceanic – 5:17
5. Spell – 2:59
6. Seventh Sign – 5:18
7. The Oracle – 6:36
8. Cloudlines – 3:55
9. Lesser Banshee – 4:40
10. Abyss – 5:12
