= Take a Look Inside (The Folk Implosion album) =

Studio album by the Folk Implosion
- Released: 1994
- Genre: Indie rock; lo-fi
- Length: 21:35
- Label: Communion

The Folk Implosion chronology
Take a Look Inside (1994)	Dare to Be Surprised (1997)

Take a Look Inside is the debut studio album by the Folk Implosion. It was released on Communion in 1994. The album experienced an uptick in sales after the release of "Natural One", selling around 10,000 copies.

== Critical reception ==
Professional ratings
Review scores
Source	Rating
AllMusic	3/5 stars
The Encyclopedia of Popular Music	3/5 stars
The New Rolling Stone Album Guide	3.5/5 stars

Trouser Press called the album "more ambitious [than previous releases] thanks in part to minor studio tinkering (on the reverb-laden 'Blossom') and in part to snappy genre juxtapositions — like the Mersey-punk title track and the Lennonish 'Slap Me'." The New Rolling Stone Album Guide called the album "a lightweight goof, rocking through 14 catchy songs in 22 minutes."

== Track listing ==
All tracks are written by Lou Barlow and John Davis

No.	Title	Length
1.	"Blossom"	1:00
2.	"Sputnik's Down"	1:16
3.	"Slap Me"	1:44
4.	"Chicken Squawk"	0:53
5.	"Spiderweb-Butterfly"	1:20
6.	"Hard to Find Out"	2:06
7.	"Better Than Allrite"	2:11
8.	"Why Do They Hide"	1:08
9.	"Winter's Day"	1:00
10.	"Boyfriend, Girlfriend"	1:49
11.	"Shake a Little Heaven"	1:28
12.	"Waltzin' with Your Ego"	2:02
13.	"Take a Look Inside"	1:16
14.	"Start Again"	2:16
Total length:		21:35

== Personnel ==
Credits adapted from liner notes.

The Folk Implosion

- Lou Barlow – performance, arrangement, mixing
- John Davis – performance, arrangement, mixing

Additional personnel

- Tim O'Heir – mixing
