= Imaad Wasif =

Canadian musician (born 1977)

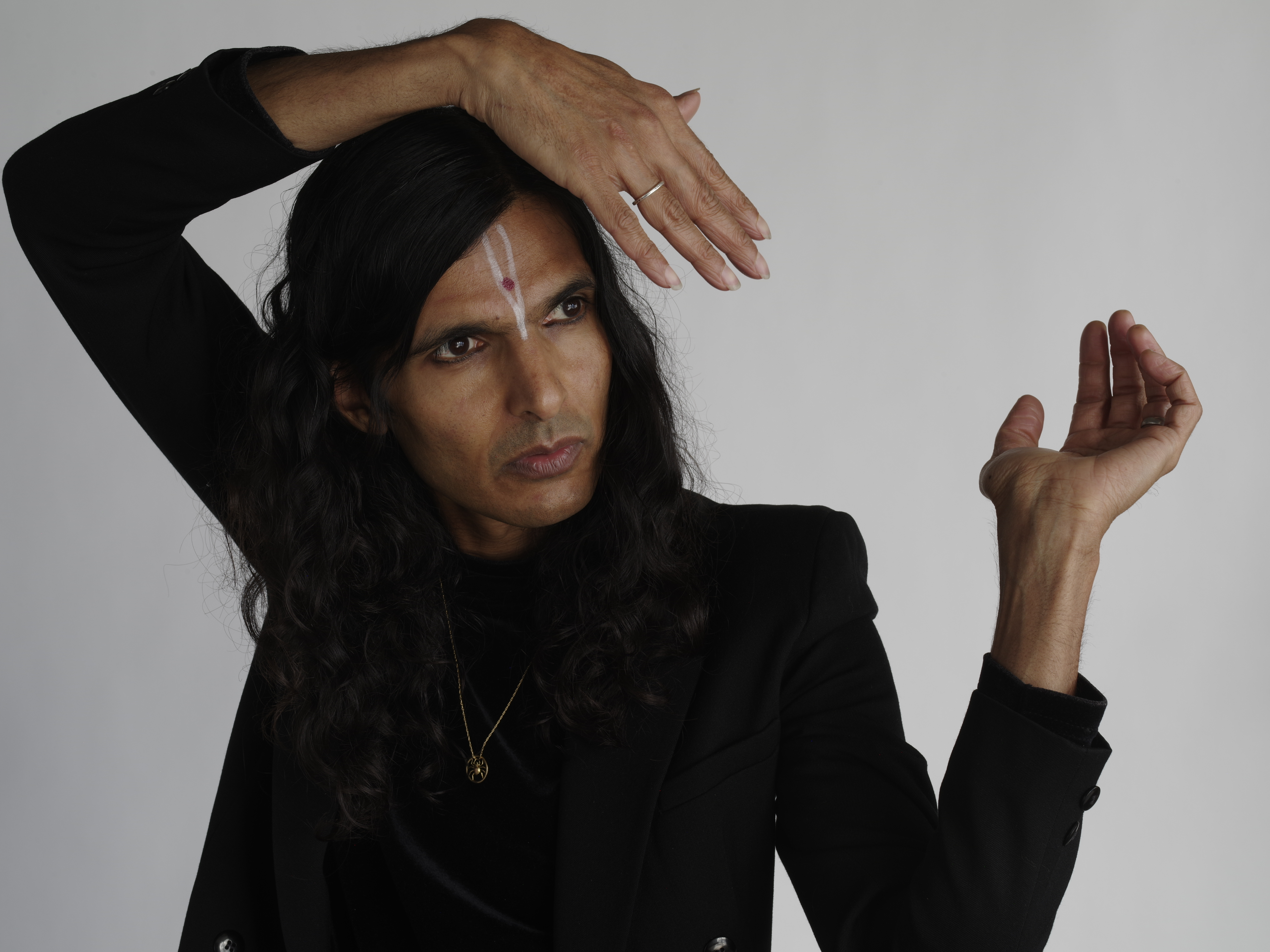

Background information
- Born: October 27, 1977 (age 48)
- Origin: Vancouver, British Columbia, Canada
- Genres: Psychedelic rock; folk rock; experimental rock
- Occupation: Musician
- Instruments: Guitar; bass; piano
- Formerly of: Lowercase; Alaska!; the Folk Implosion; ACID; Grim Tower
- Website: iwasif.com

Imaad Wasif (born October 27, 1977) is a Canadian singer, songwriter, and guitarist whose music combines elements of psychedelic folk and rock. Wasif's music has been described as "unbelievably intense with sparkling, raga-influenced guitar and a mystic bent."

== Career ==
Wasif has released seven solo albums. He was the lead vocalist and guitarist of the post-hardcore band lowercase and also collaborated in the projects Alaska!, Grim Tower with Stephen McBean, the Folk Implosion with Lou Barlow, and the sci-fi concept band ACID.

In 2006, he joined Yeah Yeah Yeahs as a touring member, playing acoustic guitar, bass and synths. He performed as the supporting act for most shows. Wasif also wrote songs with Karen O for the soundtrack to Where the Wild Things Are (2009), most notably the song "Hideaway."

His debut, self-titled solo album was released in 2006 on Kill Rock Stars. The record featured minimal, acoustic songs with psychedelic influences, reminiscent of Skip Spence's Oar and Syd Barrett's Opel, and was recorded by Mark Nevers in Nashville, Tennessee. This record introduced Wasif's primary lyrical themes; love, madness, transformation, solitude, exploration of the spiritual, which continue through his subsequent albums.

Wasif's second album, Strange Hexes, was recorded in Los Angeles and self-released in 2008. The album is a "tense, trippy collection of songs that become fiercely emotional explorations." The songs incorporate Eastern modal tunings and drones.

Wasif's third album, The Voidist, was released in 2010 on Tee Pee Records. Recorded in Los Angeles, The Voidist is at once "regal and exuberant. Its unique sonic tapestry is sprinkled with ragas, blues rock, and something totally new that exists at the apex of these varied influences." Influences that Wasif has cited include Paul Bowles, Gérard de Nerval, Neil Young, CAN, John Fahey, Captain Beefheart, Jimmy Page, and Vilayat Khan.

In 2017, Wasif released Dzi. The album was recorded on a Tascam Cassette 8-Track Machine by Bobb Bruno, capturing a raw, live feel.

Wasif's album Great Eastern Sun was released on December 1, 2018, on Nomad Eel Records. This album was recorded earlier in 2013 but held back from release as Wasif deemed it "too dark and personal." In 2021, he self-released a compilation of rarities, demos and B-sides called Afterimages.

So Long Mr. Fear, was released on August 9, 2022. Co-produced again with Bobb Bruno and mixed by Lewis Pesacov, the album was recorded remotely during the pandemic year 2021. The album features a vocal appearance by Karen O on the song "Poet of the Damned". In 2023, the title track was remixed in collaboration with Money Mark and released as "Mr. Fear, So Long".

In March 2026, Wasif released his seventh solo album, Superconsciousness, the first to be released on the new IW imprint, Voidist Records. The album was written and recorded during a time of personal upheaval, a pervasive disillusionment with the state of the world and was completed while being displaced by the 2025 Eaton Fires. Wasif states in interviews that the album is "a collection of songs meant to transmute darkness".

In September 2026, the demon's way EP was released, furthering Wasif's psychedelic folk explorations. "I’m trying to reconnect to the embryonic pure state, outside of all the insanity of the world right now. This is the most vulnerable thing I can do. I’m leaning farther into the traditions of dark folk.”

This period also marked the release of the Yeah Yeah Yeahs album, Hidden in Pieces Live at the Royal Albert Hall, which features Wasif's acoustic guitar playing.

== Film ==
Wasif played the role of a British musician named Dean in the 2002 film Laurel Canyon, directed by Lisa Cholodenko. The film starred Frances McDormand and Christian Bale.

== Discography ==
Solo albums

- Superconsciousness (Voidist Records, 2026)
- So Long Mr. Fear (Sonic Ritual, 2022)
- Afterimages (Rarities and Demos) (Dead Set Music, 2021)
- Great Eastern Sun (Nomad Eel Records, 2018)
- Dzi (Grey Market, 2017)
- The Voidist (Tee Pee Records, 2009)
- Strange Hexes (World In Sound, 2008)
- Imaad Wasif (Kill Rock Stars, 2006)

EPs

- demon's way (Voidist Records, 2026)

Bands, collaborations, and guest appearances

- Yeah Yeah Yeahs - Hidden In Pieces Live at the Royal Albert Hall (Secretly Canadian, 2026)
- Karen O & Imaad Wasif – "Mothers Song" from the film The Seeding (Milan Records, 2023)
- Money Mark vs. Imaad Wasif – "Mr. Fear, So Long (Rework)" (Sonic Ritual, 2023)
- ACID – "Romance" (Narnack Records, 2021)
- ACID – "Science Fiction with Acid" (Narnack Records, 2021)
- ACID – "Persona" (Narnack Records, 2021)
- Willie Nelson & Karen O – Under Pressure (BMG, 2020)
- Karen O – Crush Songs (Cult Records, 2014)
- Sabbath Assembly – Eno Ot Derotser (Svart Records, 2014)
- Grim Tower – Anarchic Breezes (Outer Battery Records, 2013)
- Electric Flower – EP lI (Narnack Records, 2012)
- Electric Flower – EP l (Narnack Records, 2011)
- Where the Wild Things Are: Motion Picture Soundtrack (Interscope, 2009)
- Lou Barlow – Goodnight Unknown (Merge, 2009)
- Yeah Yeah Yeahs – Its Blitz! (Interscope, 2009)
- Yeah Yeah Yeahs – "The Love I'm Searching For" (AOL Exclusive, 2007)
- Yeah Yeah Yeahs – Mississippi Studios: Live, Vol. 3 (2007)
- Yeah Yeah Yeahs – Live Session EP (iTunes Exclusive, 2007)
- Lou Barlow – Emoh (Merge, 2005)
- Alaska! – Kiss You/Pink Frost, CD Single (Altitude Records, 2005)
- Alaska! – Rescue Through Tomahawk (Altitude Records, 2005)
- Alaska! – Five Songs (self-released, 2004)
- Alaska! – "r u listenin" on Tracks & Fields (compilation) (Kill Rock Stars, 2004)
- The Folk Implosion – The New Folk Implosion (iMusic, 2003)
- The Folk Implosion – Pearl, 7" (Domino, 2003)
- The Folk Implosion – Brand of Skin, 7" (Domino, 2003)
- Alaska! – "In My Time" on The Fold Comp (compilation) (Credit Records, 2003)
- Alaska! – "Lost the Gold" on Speed of Sound (compilation) (Flying Nun Records, 2003)
- Alaska! – Emotions (Flying Nun Records, 2003)
- Alaska! – Four Songs (self-released, 2001)
- lowercase – The Going Away Present (Punk in My Vitamins, 1999)
- Lowercase – "Surefire Solvent" on Multi-Vitamin Compilation (Punk In My Vitamins, 1998)
- Lowercase – The Open Sea / Don't Cry No Tears, Mail Order Freak Singles Club #1–4, 7" (Kill Rock Stars, 1998)
- Lowercase – Imbedded In Ice, 7″ (Punk in My Vitamins, 1998)
- Lowercase – "Ringbleeder" on AmRep Equipped (compilation) (Amphetamine Reptile, 1997)
- Lowercase – Kill The Lights (Amphetamine Reptile, 1997)
- Lowercase – All Destructive Urges...Seem So Perfect (Amphetamine Reptile, 1996)
- Lowercase – "My Shame Your Shame" (compilation) (WIN Records, 1995)
- Lowercase – Cadence, 7″ (Amphetamine Reptile, 1995)
- Lowercase – Brass Tacks, 7″ (Xmas Records, 1995)
- Lowercase – Two Songs, 7″ (Punk in My Vitamins, 1995)

Solo contributions on compilations

- "We Give Our Lives" on "Ye Are Gods" by Sabbath Assembly (Svart Records, 2012)
- "Go Insane" (Doors Cover) on Beat LA Compilation (Narnack Records. 2011)
- "The Fire" (ft. Lykke Li) on L'Aventure (remake of the 2nd Television album) (Aquarium Drunkard, 2010)
- "Not Immune" on RAISE Hope For Congo Compilation (Mercer Street Records, 2010)
- "Ecstasy" on LA Collection 7" (IAMSOUND, 2010)
- "The New Year" on Kill Rock Stars Winter Holiday Album (Kill Rock Stars, 2006)
- "Other Voices" on The Sound the Hare Heard (Kill Rock Stars, 2006)
