= Beachwood Canyon (album) =

Studio album by Jem
- Released: 5 August 2016
- Recorded: 2009–2014
- Genre: Pop
- Length: 35:35
- Label: Orchid Entertainment
- Producer: Jem, Michael Bradford

Jem chronology
Down to Earth (2008)	Beachwood Canyon (2016)

Singles from Beachwood Canyon
- 1. "Beachwood Canyon" Released: 1 July 2016

Beachwood Canyon is the third studio album by Jem, released 5 August 2016.

== Background ==
In January 2015, it was announced that the album would be released within the year; it was not. In January 2016, Jem published on her Facebook page the first photoshoots of the Beachwood Canyon era and announced the official release of the album for spring 2016.

On Beachwood Canyon, Jem showcases her production skills, with the album looking to yesteryear for inspiration, and especially to the sounds of Simon & Garfunkel, The Byrds and the Beatles. The album's roots and title were established when Jem lived in Beachwood Canyon, Los Angeles – famed for being the winding road that leads to the Hollywood Sign. The majority of the album was recorded at Grandmaster Studios in Hollywood.

The sole single "Beachwood Canyon", was released on 1 July. For "Beachwood Canyon", Jem released lyric videos which featured the lyrics written in 13 different languages, including Welsh, German, and Japanese.

== Critical reception ==
Allan Raible for ABC News called the album "beautiful", adding that it was "an ideal listening choice for those looking for something on a mellow summer afternoon".

== Track listing ==
Beachwood Canyon track listing
No.	Title	Writer(s)	Producer(s)	Length
1.	"Intro"	Jem Griffiths, Justin Griffiths	Jem	0:39
2.	"Beachwood Canyon"	Jem, J. Griffiths	Jem, Michael Bradford (add.)	3:47
3.	"So Gold"	Jem, Harry Robinson, Roy Tuvey	Jem, Bradford (add.)	4:13
4.	"My Love"	Jem, Joseph Mendicino	Jem, Bradford (add.)	3:19
5.	"Momma"	Jem, J. Griffiths	Jem	3:42
6.	"Don't Look Back"	Jem, J. Griffiths	Jem, Bradford (add.)	3:15
7.	"I Sit up in My Window"	Jem, Harvey Andrews	Jem, Bradford (add.)	4:28
8.	"Tell It to My Heart"	Jem, Yoad Nevo	Jem	3:26
9.	"The Adventures of Cupid and Puck"	Jem, Paul Herman	Jem	3:43
10.	"Hold On"	Jem, Mendicino	Jem	5:03
Total length:				35:35
