= Jem (singer) =

Welsh singer, songwriter, and record producer (born 1975)

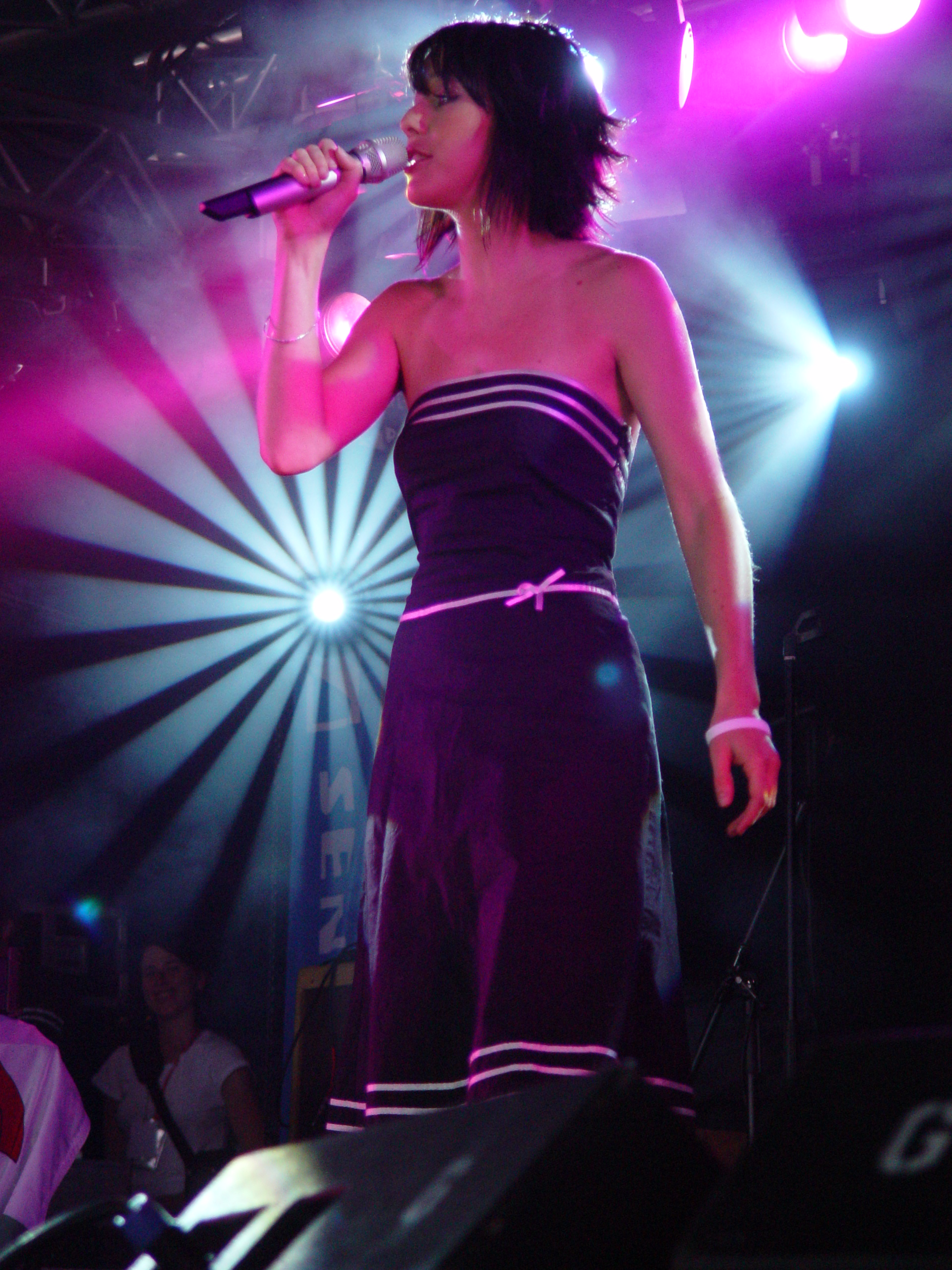
- Jem performing on the John Peel Stage at Glastonbury Festival on Sunday 26 June 2005

Background information
- Born: Jemma Gwynne Griffiths; 18 May 1975 (age 51); Penarth, Glamorgan, Wales
- Genres: Trip hop; electronica; pop rock; new wave; folktronica
- Occupations: Singer, songwriter, record producer, DJ, screenwriter
- Instruments: Vocals, piano
- Years active: 1998–present
- Labels: ATO; MapleMusic Recordings (Canada); Sony BMG; RCA
- Website: jem-music.com

Jemma Gwynne Griffiths (born 18 May 1975), known by her stage name Jem, is a Welsh singer, songwriter, and record producer.

Born and raised in Penarth, Glamorgan, she began songwriting at an early age. After graduating from university in 1996, she worked as a DJ as well as co-founder of record label Marine Parade in Brighton. On 24 March 2004, she released her debut studio album Finally Woken through ATO Records. Featuring the singles "They", "Just a Ride" and "Wish I", the album saw the most success in the United Kingdom, where it was certified Platinum. Jem followed up her debut with her second album, Down to Earth, released on 18 September 2008. Her third album, Beachwood Canyon, was released in 2016.

== Early life and education ==
Jemma Griffiths was born in Penarth, Wales, a small town near Cardiff on 18 May 1975. Jem originally found her passion for singing and songwriting whilst attending Stanwell School. During her early school years she explored her musical interests with the family piano, penning her first song at the age of thirteen. Jem has three siblings, older sister Chloe, eldest sister Georgia, who provided vocals for the Welsh indie/punk band Weapons of Mass Belief alongside brother Justin, who also goes by the name Yestyn, of Glass Pear.

In 1993, Jem moved to Brighton to study Law at the University of Sussex. Both during her studies and after graduating in 1996, Jem spent time as a club and festival promoter and also began working as a DJ in Brighton's club scene under the name Jem, inspired by the animated series Jem and the Holograms.

== Career ==
=== 1999–2006: It All Starts Here... and Finally Woken ===
In early 1998, alongside Adam Freeland, she co-founded and helped run the specialist breakbeat/hip hop record label Marine Parade. However, after spending two years acting as agent and promoter for other aspiring musicians, she soon felt that she had neglected her own musical career. In November 1999, she left Brighton and returned to Wales, where she assembled a mobile recording studio and focused on developing her own individual songwriting and music production skills, completing a collection of four demos that acted as the basis of her break into the music industry.

In 2000, Jem moved to London where she met Sugababes manager Sarah Stennett, with whom she began a professional relationship. Stennett introduced her to other writers and producers. She had a writing session with electronic producer Guy Sigsworth, during which the song "Nothing Fails" was created; the song was eventually picked up by Madonna for her 2003 studio album, American Life. In 2001, Jem travelled to Brooklyn, New York City, teaming up with hip hop producer Ge-Ology and co-producer Yoad Nevo. In March 2002, Jem stopped by independent radio station KCRW to leave a demo of her song "Finally Woken" in Nic Harcourt's mailbox. Harcourt began playing it on his show Morning Becomes Eclectic. This attracted the attention of Bruce Flohr, an A&R rep for RCA Records and newly established ATO Records, who offered her a recording contract. She was subsequently signed to the label and Jem relocated to Los Angeles.

On 13 October 2003, in preparation for the release of her full-length album, Jem released the EP It All Starts Here..., consisting of five tracks. Her full-length studio album Finally Woken was released in the United States on 24 March 2004. In the United Kingdom, "They" was released as her lead single on 13 March 2005. This was followed by "Just a Ride" in June and "Wish I" in September, which was used as the theme tune to UK reality television programme Celebrity Love Island. Finally Awoken spent 32 weeks on the UK Album Chart and peaked at number 6. Jem licensed every song on her album to be broadcast on American television programs, films and advertisements as a method of promotion. Television program The O.C. was the first to use Jem's music in several of their episodes, eventually inviting her to guest-star on the show. She performed a cover version of Paul McCartney's 1970 song "Maybe I'm Amazed" in the first season finale. Since then, every song from the album has appeared in various television programs, such as Six Feet Under, Desperate Housewives, Without a Trace and Grey's Anatomy.

=== 2007–2009: Down to Earth ===
In 2006, Jem decided to cease touring and to spend a year focusing on writing new material and developing her second studio album. She parted from Yoad Nevo and met with four different producers across the United States. Over the next few years she worked with Jeff Bass in Detroit as well as meeting with Lester Mendez in Los Angeles. Producers Mike Bradford and Greg Kurstin also collaborated with Jem. During the production of her album, Jem wrote and lent her vocals to the song "Once in Every Lifetime" which appeared on the Eragon movie soundtrack.

Jem's second studio album, Down to Earth was released in the United States, Canada, and Japan on 18 September 2008 with the European releases varying by each country between January and March 2009. The album peaked at 48 on the Billboard 200 and 64 on the UK Albums Chart The lead single of the album "It's Amazing" originally appeared on the soundtrack for the 2008 movie Sex and the City. Released 3 June 2008, the song failed to chart in the United States or the United Kingdom. Her following single releases off the album included: "Crazy" in August 2008, "And So I Pray" in May 2009, and "I Want You To..." in October 2009, however, they did not grant as much commercial success as her debut album. On 4 December 2009, Jem released the single "Until the Morning Comes", which was a collaboration with her brother, Glass Pear.

=== 2010–2016: Other projects and Beachwood Canyon ===
In 2011, Jem contributed to the record Ten Years On: A Collection of Songs in Remembrance of September 11th 2001. In 2012, Jem returned to producing her third album. In November, she recorded tracks at the Grand Master Studios, in Hollywood, and originally anticipated a release in early 2013. Outside of music, she also announced that she had spent several years writing a screenplay.

After numerous delays, in January 2016, Jem published the first photoshoots for the Beachwood Canyon album on her Facebook page and announced the official release of the album for spring 2016. The first single "Beachwood Canyon" was released on 1 July. On 5 August 2016, the album was released digitally worldwide.

== Musical style ==
Jem's musical style is varied and encompasses genres such as trip hop, electronica, pop rock and new wave, with critics often associating her with other female musicians Dido and Beth Orton.

== Personal life ==
In September 2009, Jem married American musician and songwriter Joseph George in Montecito, California. They had originally met in 2005, on the set of filming the music video for "Wish I", where George acted the role of Jem's love interest. They both currently reside in Los Angeles.

== Awards and nominations ==
Award	Year	Category	Nominee(s)	Result	Ref.
RTHK International Pop Poll Awards	2006	Jem	Top New Act	Nominated	
RTHK International Pop Poll Awards	2006	Jem	Top Female Artist	Nominated	
RTHK International Pop Poll Awards	2006	"They"	Top Ten International Gold Songs	Nominated	

== Discography ==
=== Studio albums ===
Title	Details	Peak chart positions					
Title	Details	UK	AUS	IRE	US	US Heat	US Indie
Finally Woken	First studio album; Released: 24 March 2004; Labels: ATO, RCA; Formats: CD, download	6	36	15	197	11	—
Down to Earth	Released: 16 September 2008 (US); Label: ATO; Formats: CD, download	64	—	—	43	—	4
Beachwood Canyon	Released: 5 August 2016; Label: Orchid Entertainment; Formats: CD, download	—	—	—	—	—	—

=== EPs ===
- It All Starts Here... (13 October 2003, US only release)

=== Singles ===
Single	Year	Peak chart positions										Album
Single	Year	UK	AUS	AUT	CAN	GER	IRE	ITA	NLD	SWE	US AAA	Album
"They"	2004	6	28	15	—	45	8	47	29	47	18	Finally Woken
"Just a Ride"	2005	16	—	—	—	—	27	—	89	—	—	Finally Woken
"Wish I"	2005	24	—	—	—	—	27	—	—	—	—	Finally Woken
"24"	2005	—	—	—	—	—	—	—	—	—	—	Finally Woken
"It's Amazing"	2008	—	—	—	—	77	—	—	—	—	—	Down to Earth
"Crazy"	2008	—	—	—	97	—	—	—	—	—	—	Down to Earth
"And So I Pray"	2009	— (Note: "And So I Pray" did not enter the UK Singles Chart, but debuted and peaked at number 71 on the UK Physical Singles Chart.)	—	—	—	—	—	—	—	—	—	Down to Earth
"I Want You To..."	2009	—	—	—	—	—	—	—	—	—	—	Down to Earth
"Until the Morning Comes" (with Glass Pear)	2009	—	—	—	—	—	—	—	—	—	—	Non-album single
"Beachwood Canyon"	2016	—	—	—	—	—	—	—	—	—	—	Beachwood Canyon
"Rainbow"	2022	—	—	—	—	—	—	—	—	—	—	Non-album single

== Music videos ==
Year	Song	Director	Album
2005	"They"	Laurent Briet	Finally Woken
2005	"Just a Ride"	Steven Murashige	Finally Woken
2005	"Wish I"	Steven Murashige	Finally Woken
2009	"It's Amazing"	Saam Gabbay	Down to Earth
2009	"I Want You to..."	Jemma Griffiths	Down to Earth

=== Various ===
Song	Production Title	Year	Production Type
"Just a Ride"	Music from the OC: Mix 1	2004	soundtrack
"Maybe I'm Amazed"	Music from the OC: Mix 2	2004	soundtrack
"California Sun"	"Just a Ride"	2005	single
"Amazing Life"	Six Feet Under, Vol. 2: Everything Ends	2005	soundtrack
"Easy Way Out"	Carmen Rizzo: The Lost Art of the Idle Moment	2005	album
"The Thieves"	Weapons	2006	album
"Once in Every Lifetime"	Eragon: Music from the Motion Picture	2006	soundtrack
"Everytime"	Vusi Mahlasela: Guiding Star	2007	album
"Ecouter"	Carmen Rizzo: Ornament of an Imposter	2008	album
"It's Amazing"	Sex and the City: The Movie: Original Motion Picture Soundtrack	2008	soundtrack
"Yellow"	Sweetheart: Our Favorite Artists Sing Their Favorite Love Songs	2009	compilation
"Until the Morning Comes"	Glass Pear: Until the Morning Comes	2009	single

== Song usage ==
Song	Production	Year	Type
"Come on Closer"	Closer; Las Vegas; Life As We Know It; Desperate Housewives	2004; 2006; 2004; 2004	trailer unofficial soundtrack Clip; Official Season 1 Promo
"Wish I"	Celebrity Love Island; Grey's Anatomy S. 1, Ep. 7	2004; 2005	title theme unofficial soundtrack
"Maybe I'm Amazed"	The OC	2004	official soundtrack
"Just a Ride"	The OC; Monster-in-Law; The Prince and Me; Grey's Anatomy S. 2, Ep. 2 Summerland; Shark S2E03; Six Feet Under S4E06	2004; 2005; 2005; 2005; 2004; 2007; 2004	official soundtrack official soundtrack official soundtrack unofficial soundtrack
"They"	The OC; Crossing Jordan; Grey's Anatomy S. 1, Ep. 1 The X Effect; Strictly Come Dancing	2004; 2004; 2005; 2007	unofficial soundtrack unofficial soundtrack unofficial soundtrack title theme Tango/Argentine Tango Track (Series 5/8)
"Save Me"	Grey's Anatomy S. 1, Ep. 6	2005	unofficial soundtrack
"Flying High"	Wonderfalls S.1, Ep. 11; Grey's Anatomy S. 2, Ep. 20; One Tree Hill S. 2, Ep. 15; Laguna Beach; Sex Drive	2004; 2005	unofficial soundtrack
"Amazing Life"	Six Feet Under; Lexus ES 350	2005; 2006	official soundtrack advert
"24"	Ultraviolet; Smallville; Center Stage: Turn It Up; Without a Trace	2006; 2005; 2008; 2005	trailer unofficial soundtrack unofficial soundtrack trailer
"Once in Every Lifetime"	Eragon	2006	official soundtrack
"California Sun"	Grey's Anatomy S. 3, Ep. 22	2007	unofficial soundtrack
"It's Amazing"	Sex and the City: The Movie; Medium S. 5, Ep. 89, 90	2008; 2009	official soundtrack unofficial soundtrack
"Crazy"	Gossip Girl	2008	unofficial soundtrack
"I Always Knew"	90210	2008	unofficial soundtrack
"Keep on Walking"	Damages S. 2, Ep. 13; Orange Is the New Black S. 1, Ep. 12	2009; 2013	unofficial soundtrack
"Forever and a Day"	Beastly	2011	unofficial soundtrack
