= Natural One =

Single by The Folk Implosion

from the album Kids Original Soundtrack
- B-side: "Cabride"
- Released: November 21, 1995
- Genre: Alternative rock
- Length: 6:03
- Label: PolyGram; London
- Songwriters: Lou Barlow; John H. Davis
- Producer: Wally Gagel

The Folk Implosion singles chronology
"Electric Idiot" (1994)	"Natural One" (1995)	"Palm of My Hand" (1996)

"Natural One" is a song by American band The Folk Implosion, released as a single in November 1995, and was featured on the soundtrack to the Larry Clark film Kids, but does not appear in the film itself. The song peaked at numbers 27 and 29 on the US Cash Box Top 100 and Billboard Hot 100 charts. It also reached number four on the Billboard Modern Rock Tracks chart, number 20 on the Billboard Mainstream Rock Tracks chart and number 45 on the UK Singles Chart.

In 2023, the band released the compilation Music for Kids. It consisted of the band's contributions to the Kids soundtrack (which included "Natural One") in addition to other tracks from the same era. It was stated that the compilation's purpose was to bypass the various record label issues, and to compile the tracks together under one full-length release (as an example, although "Natural One" was considered to be the band's signature song, the aforementioned issues prevented it from appearing on streaming services previously).

== Background ==
The song was written by Folk Implosion members Lou Barlow and John H. Davis, along with producer Wally Gagel. There was also an a capella version of this song

== Music video ==
An accompanying music video was released and achieved MTV Buzz Bin status. The AV Club's Annie Zaleski describes the promotional clip as "a cross between a National Geographic special on nature and an art school film."

== In other media ==
It was used as the theme song for AMC Network's "Long Live Cool" promos, as well an episode of The People v. O. J. Simpson: American Crime Story and the Netflix documentary miniseries Pepsi, Where's My Jet? (2022). It also appeared in the video game Tony Hawk's Proving Ground (2007).

In 2013, the band Shearwater covered the song on their all-covers album, Fellow Travelers. Their version of Natural One was used in an episode of the Netflix series Beef (2023).

== Track listings ==
London Records released a promotional single/ep on CD and cassette to promote the film and soundtrack.

US CD/Cassette single

1. "Natural One" 3:10
2. "Cabride" 2:54

UK release

1. "Natural One" 3:10
2. "Cabride" 2:54
3. "Nothing Gonna Stop" 4:11
4. "Simean Groove" 3:30

Australian and US EP releases

1. "Natural One"
2. "Nothing Gonna Stop the Flow"
3. "Cabride"
4. "Their Theme"
5. "Nasa Theme"

== Charts ==
Chart (1995)	Peak position
US Billboard Hot 100	29
US Mainstream Rock Tracks (Billboard)	20
US Modern Rock Tracks (Billboard)	4
UK Singles (OCC)	45
US Cash Box Top 100	27
