= Emotions (Alaska! album) =

Studio album by alaska!
- Released: February 4, 2003
- Genre: Indie rock
- Length: 45:24
- Label: b-girl records

Alaska! chronology
Emotions (2003)	Rescue Through Tomahawk (2005)

Emotions is the debut studio album by alaska!. It was released February 4, 2003, on b-girl records.

== Track listing ==
1. "The Western Shore" - 4:30
2. "Love (To Be Your Main)" - 4:24
3. "Sun Don't Shine" - 4:01
4. "Broken" - 4:52
5. "S.S./Candycane" - 2:46
6. "S.S./Candycane (Continued)" - 1:40
7. "Rust and Cyanide" - 6:11
8. "Lost the Gold" - 3:44
9. "Resistance" - 3:53
10. "Nightmare X" - 4:00
11. "In My Time" - 5:23

Professional ratings
Review scores
Source	Rating
Allmusic	3/5 stars
Pitchfork Media	7.9/10
