= One Part Lullaby =

Studio album by The Folk Implosion
- Released: September 7, 1999
- Genre: Alternative rock
- Length: 55:02
- Label: Interscope
- Producer: Wally Gagel

The Folk Implosion chronology
Dare to Be Surprised (1997)	One Part Lullaby (1999)	The New Folk Implosion (2003)

Singles from One Part Lullaby
- 1. "Free to Go" Released: 2000

One Part Lullaby is the third studio album by the Folk Implosion. It was released on Interscope Records on September 7, 1999. In Europe, it was released on Domino Recording Company. "Free to Go" peaked at number 90 on the UK Singles Chart.

== Critical reception ==
Professional ratings
Aggregate scores
Source	Rating
Metacritic	77/100
Review scores
Source	Rating
AllMusic	3/5 stars
Drowned in Sound	8/10
E!	B
Entertainment Weekly	A−
The New Rolling Stone Album Guide	3.5/5 stars
NME	8/10
Q	4/5 stars
Rolling Stone	3.5/5 stars
Spin	8/10
The Village Voice	B+

At Metacritic, which assigns a weighted average score out of 100 to reviews from mainstream critics, the album received an average score of 77, based on 13 reviews, indicating "generally favorable reviews".

== Track listing ==
No.	Title	Writer(s)	Length
1.	"My Ritual"	Lou Barlow; John Davis; Wally Gagel	4:35
2.	"One Part Lullaby"	Barlow; Davis; Gagel	3:28
3.	"Free to Go"	Barlow; Davis; Gagel	3:32
4.	"Serge"	Barlow; Davis; Gagel	4:06
5.	"E.Z.L.A."	Barlow; Davis; Gagel	5:44
6.	"Mechanical Man"	Barlow; Davis	5:23
7.	"Kingdom of Lies"	Barlow; Davis	3:47
8.	"Gravity Decides"	Barlow; Davis; Gagel	3:34
9.	"Chained to the Moon"	Barlow; Davis	4:53
10.	"Merry-Go-Down"	Barlow; Davis	3:24
11.	"Someone You Love"	Barlow; Davis; Gagel	3:21
12.	"No Need to Worry"	Barlow; Davis; Gagel	6:13
13.	"Back to the Sunrise"	Barlow; Davis	3:10
Total length:			55:02

== Personnel ==
Credits adapted from liner notes.

The Folk Implosion

- Lou Barlow – lead vocals, bass guitar, guitar, sampler, keyboards, synthesizer, Omnichord, melodica, glockenspiel, harp, vocals
- John Davis – backing vocals, guitars, synthesizer, banjo, dulcimer, sampler, drums, drum machine, percussion, layout, design concept

Additional personnel

- Josh Randall – additional programming (7)
- Mia Doi Todd – vocals (9)
- Robert Caranza – recording
- Sue Kappa – recording
- Steven Macussen – mastering
- Joe Primeau – mastering assistance
- Gary Weissman – artwork, design concept, layout, photography

== Charts ==
Chart performance for One Part Lullaby
Chart (1999)	Peak position
UK Independent Albums (Official Charts)	34
