= Alaska! =

- Origin: San Francisco, California, United States
- Genres: Indie rock
- Years active: 2000–2005
- Labels: B-Girl, Flying Nun, Altitude
- Past members: Russell Pollard; Imaad Wasif; Lesley Ishino

Alaska! is an indie rock trio from the United States. The band was formed in San Francisco by Russell Pollard (formerly of Sebadoh and later of the Folk Implosion) and Imaad Wasif (also later of Folk Implosion), with Lesley Ishino (formerly of the Red Aunts) later joining as drummer.

== Discography ==
The band released their debut album, Emotions, in 2003, and a second, Rescue Through Tomahawk, in 2005.

- Emotions (B-Girl Records, February, 2003)
- Rescue Through Tomahawk (Altitude Records, 2005)
- "Kiss You" (single) (Altitude Records, 2005)
