= Finally Woken =

- Cover artwork for some editions of the album. (Note: Digital editions of the album have the album title and image in blue coloring, and the 20th anniversary remastered edition has both in purple coloring.)

Studio album by Jem
- Released: 23 March 2004
- Recorded: 1999–2003
- Genres: Trip hop, electronic, pop rock, folktronica
- Length: 41:53
- Label: ATO
- Producers: Jem, Yoad Nevo, Ge-ology

Jem chronology
It All Starts Here... (2003)	Finally Woken (2004)	Down to Earth (2008)

Singles from Finally Woken
- 1. "They" Released: 17 February 2004; 2. "Just a Ride" Released: 13 June 2005; 3. "Wish I" Released: 12 September 2005

Finally Woken is the debut studio album by Welsh singer-songwriter Jem, released initially in the United States on 23 March 2004, with ATO Records.

The third single, "Wish I", has been used as the title music for UK reality TV show, Celebrity Love Island on ITV and ABC's Grey's Anatomy.

== Critical reception ==
Announced as America's biggest British female debut artist of 2004, Rolling Stone complimented her "sense of sonic humor".

== Commercial reception ==
It has sold over 500,000 copies in the UK as of January 2009 and, as of 4 July 2009, had sold 332,000 copies in the United States, according to Nielsen SoundScan.

Professional ratings
Aggregate scores
Source	Rating
Metacritic	70/100
Review scores
Source	Rating
Allmusic	3/5 stars
Entertainment Weekly	B
The Guardian	4/5 stars
PopMatters	Mixed
Q Magazine	4/5 stars
Rolling Stone	3/5 stars
Yahoo! Music	7/10 stars

== Track listing ==
No.	Title	Writer(s)	Producer(s)	Length
1.	"They"	Jem Griffiths, Gerard Young (Ge-ology)	Yoad Nevo, Jem, Ge-ology	3:16
2.	"Come on Closer"	Jem, Young	Yoad Nevo, Jem, Ge-ology	3:47
3.	"Finally Woken"	Jem	Yoad Nevo, Jem	3:58
4.	"Save Me"	Jem, Young	Yoad Nevo, Jem, Ge-ology	3:33
5.	"24"	Jem, Justin Griffiths	Yoad Nevo, Jem	3:54
6.	"Missing You"	Jem, J. Griffiths	Yoad Nevo, Jem	4:01
7.	"Wish I"	Jem	Yoad Nevo, Jem	3:56
8.	"Just a Ride"	Jem, Mike Caren	Yoad Nevo, Jem	3:20
9.	"Falling for You"	Jem, Nick Coler, Brian Higgins	Yoad Nevo, Jem	4:17
10.	"Stay Now"	Jem, Klas.B Wahl, Nick Whitecross	Yoad Nevo, Jem	3:43
11.	"Flying High"	Jem, Paul Herman	Yoad Nevo, Jem	4:08
Total length:				41:53

Japanese bonus track
No.	Title	Writer(s)	Producer(s)	Length
12.	"They" (Cut Chemist Remix)	Jem, Young	Cut Chemist	3:14

20th anniversary edition bonus track
No.	Title	Writer(s)	Producer(s)	Length
12.	"They" (Jem's Carnival remix)	Jem, Young	Jem	3:25

== Personnel ==
- Jem Griffiths – vocals, executive production
- Danny Griffin – bass
- Justin Griffiths – acoustic guitar
- Paul Herman – acoustic guitar
- Nick Ingman – conductor, string arrangements
- Israel Nachum – drums
- Yoad Nevo – acoustic guitar, banjo, bass guitar, percussion, electric guitar, keyboard,
  sitar, double bass, Spanish guitar, mini harp, water bottle, co-production, mixing,
  mastering, recording
- A. Cherry – photography (front cover)
- Lloyd Gardiner – engineering
- Ge-Ology – co-production
- Michael Lavine – photography (booklet portraits)
- Paul Topp – photography (back cover)

== Charts ==
=== Weekly charts ===
Chart (2005)	Peak position
Australian Albums (ARIA)	36
Austrian Albums (Ö3 Austria)	73
Irish Albums (IRMA)	15
Dutch Albums (Album Top 100)	98
UK Albums (Official Charts)	6
US Billboard 200	197

=== Year-end charts ===
Chart (2005)	Position
UK Albums (OCC)	56

== Certifications ==
Region	Certification	Certified units/sales
Ireland (IRMA)	Gold	7,500^{^}
United Kingdom (BPI)	Platinum	300,000^{^}
^{^} Shipments figures based on certification alone.
