= Bliss (Danish band) =

Danish band

- Origin: Denmark
- Genres: Ambient music
- Years active: 2001–present
- Label: Music for Dreams
- Members: Steffen Aaskoven; Marc-George Anderson; Salvador "Tchando" Embalo; Alexandra Hamnede

Bliss is a Danish electronic music project.

== Biography ==
With musicians from Denmark, Sweden, and Guinea-Bissau, Bliss is an international world music, chill out, pop band based in Denmark. Anchored by Steffen Aaskoven and Marc-George Anderson, and including vocalists Alexandra Hamnede and co-writer, Tchando, they have released several albums since 2001. Their tracks have appeared in international compilations and on television programs like CSI: Crime Scene Investigation.

One of the group's earliest demos, Lost Soul, gained attention in 1997 when WWE purchased the rights to it and began using the song in some of their promotional videos, primarily for The Undertaker.

Zero 7's Sophie Barker was featured as a guest singer on the 2002 album Quiet Letters, and she collaborated again on the 2009 album No One Built This Moment.

"Breathe," from Quiet Letters, was featured in the 2009 drama Powder Blue and in Buddha Bar Volume Seven by DJ Ravin and David Visan.

== Members ==
- Steffen Aaskoven – producer & composer
- Alexandra Hamnede – singer
- Marc-George Anderson – composer
- Tchando – composer & singer

== Discography ==
=== Albums ===
- Afterlife, (Only Denmark 2001)
- Quiet Letters, (released 2003)
- Quiet Letters (u.s. edition), (released 2003)
- Afterlife, (Re-released 2005)
- They Made History, (released 2005)
- Quiet Letters/Quiet Reconstructions, (released 2006)
- No One Built This Moment, (released 2009)
- Greatest Hits, (only Digital release 2011)
- So Many of Us, (released May 2013)

=== Singles ===
- Long Life To You My Friend, (Single promo released 2001)
- Kissing, (Single promo released 2001)
- If Heaven Closes, (Single promo released 2001)
- Kissing, (Single released 2004)
- Kissing (From Sex And The City Soundtrack), (Single released 2008)
- American Heart Feat. Boy George EP, (Single released 2009)
- American Heart Feat. Boy George (Remixes by The Revenge & OOFT), (Single released 2008)
- Trust In Your Love Feat. Ane Brun (Remixes by Charles Webster), (Single released 2010)
- Desert Sun Feat. Jeanette Olsson, (Single released 2013)
