= Dare to Be Surprised =

Studio album by The Folk Implosion
- Released: April 29, 1997
- Genre: Indie rock; alternative rock; lo-fi
- Length: 37:27
- Label: Communion
- Producer: The Folk Implosion

The Folk Implosion chronology
Take a Look Inside (1994)	Dare to Be Surprised (1997)	One Part Lullaby (1999)

Singles from Dare to Be Surprised
- 1. "Insinuation" Released: 1997; 2. "Pole Position" Released: 1997

Dare to Be Surprised is the second studio album by the Folk Implosion. It was released on Communion in 1997.

== Production ==
The liner notes state that the album was "recorded at Bliss onto videotape, 8-16 tracks," and that "no analog equipment was used in the production of this record (except for a couple of things)."

== Critical reception ==
Professional ratings
Review scores
Source	Rating
AllMusic	4/5 stars
Chicago Tribune	3/4 stars
Robert Christgau	(1-star Honorable Mention)
Pitchfork	8.2/10
(The New) Rolling Stone Album Guide	3/5 stars
Spin	6/10

Stephen Thomas Erlewine of AllMusic called the album "one of the finest items in their respective catalogs." Mark Binelli of Spin commented that "the record feels frigid, less a true attempt at seduction than a tepid toe-suck."

== Track listing ==
All tracks are written by Lou Barlow and John Davis.

No.	Title	Length
1.	"Pole Position"	2:46
2.	"Wide Web"	2:50
3.	"Insinuation"	4:26
4.	"Barricade"	2:36
5.	"That's the Trick"	1:58
6.	"Checking In"	3:13
7.	"Cold Night"	1:26
8.	"Park Dub"	1:39
9.	"Burning Paper"	4:13
10.	"(Blank Paper)"	1:55
11.	"Ball and Chain"	2:32
12.	"Fall into November"	2:57
13.	"Dare to Be Surprised"	2:10
14.	"River Devotion"	1:46
Total length:		37:27

== Personnel ==
Credits adapted from liner notes.

The Folk Implosion

- Lou Barlow – bass guitar, drums, instruments, vocals
- John Davis – guitar, drums, instruments, vocals

Additional personnel

- Gary Weissman – artwork, layout
- Tamara Bonn – photography
- JJ Gifford – digital manipulation
