= The Folk Implosion =

American band

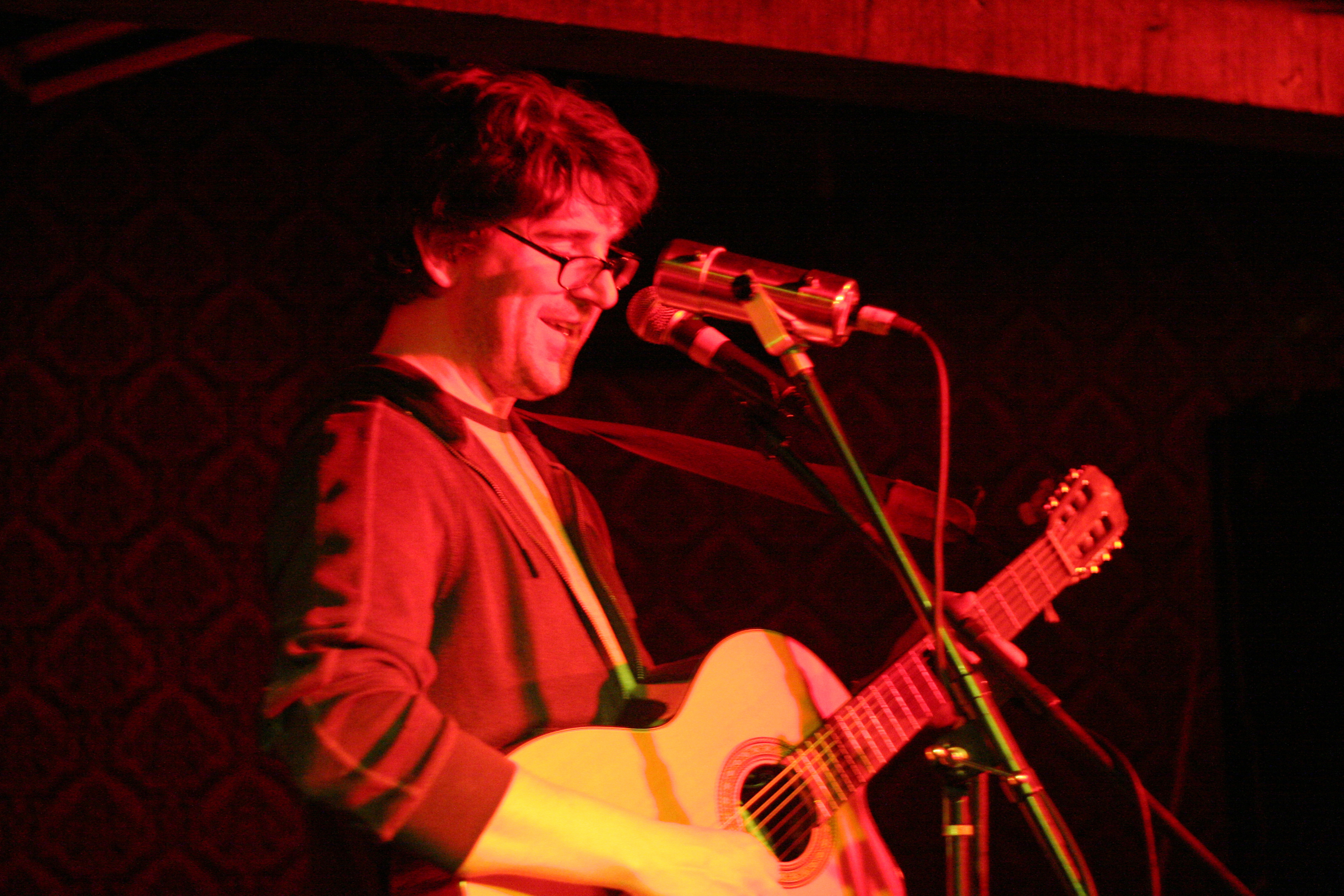
- Lou Barlow of Folk Implosion in 2005

Background information
- Origin: Boston, Massachusetts
- Genres: Indie rock, alternative rock, trip hop, indietronica
- Years active: 1993–2004, 2021–present
- Labels: Chocolate Monk, Communion Label, Interscope, Domino, Joyful Noise
- Members: Lou Barlow; John Davis
- Past members: Russ Pollard; Imaad Wasif

The Folk Implosion is an American band founded in the early 1990s by Lou Barlow and John Davis. It was initially a side-project started by Barlow to explore different territory than that which was being canvassed with his primary band at the time, Sebadoh. The name is a play on the Jon Spencer Blues Explosion. The band was on hiatus from 2004 to 2020.

== History ==
Following the release of Sebadoh's Bubble and Scrape in 1993, Barlow received a tape from Davis, songwriter and librarian, that kicked off their collaboration as a songwriting team and studio recording project. The Folk Implosion released Walk Through This World with the Folk Implosion on cassette in 1993 on the Communion Label and as a 7-inch EP in 1994 on Drunken Fish.

The band's status was relatively obscure before Larry Clark's film Kids, and its soundtrack, most of which contained original compositions by Barlow and Davis. Both Sebadoh and Folk Implosion contributed to the soundtrack, with the track "Daddy Never Understood" attributed to Deluxx Folk Implosion. Deluxx Folk Implosion included Barlow, Davis, and members of the band Deluxx, Bob Fay and Mark Peretta. The introduction of Fay and Peretta to the band allowed the Folk Implosion to realize its songs live.

"Natural One", one of the Folk Implosion songs from the Kids soundtrack, became a hit single. It peaked at no. 29 on the Billboard Hot 100, no. 4 on the Billboard Modern Rock Charts and no. 20 on the Mainstream Rock Charts. The track peaked at no. 45 in the UK Singles Chart. The video for "Natural One" was included in MTV's Buzz Bin.

In 1995, the band contributed the song "Indierockinstrumental" to Red Hot + Bothered, a benefit album for people with AIDS, produced by the Red Hot Organization.

In 1996, the band covered the song "I'm Just a Bill" from Schoolhouse Rock! for the tribute album Schoolhouse Rock! Rocks as "Deluxx Folk Implosion".

Though the band attempted to duplicate the success of "Natural One", their subsequent releases were not as successful. Dare to Be Surprised was released by Communion in 1997 and received 6/10 when reviewed in SPIN Magazine. The group had started work on the album in 1995 before "Natural One" was released. After the success of the Kids Soundtrack, Folk Implosion signed to Interscope Records and recorded the 1999 studio album One Part Lullaby. The lead single "Free to Go" peaked moderately in both the US and UK. While the album was well reviewed, Barlow and Davis chose not to tour for the album and the project in its original incarnation slowed to an end.

After Davis left the band in 2000, Barlow recruited Russ Pollard and Imaad Wasif from the band Alaska! to record The New Folk Implosion. In 2002, the band appeared as the backing musicians for the main character played by Alessandro Nivola in the film Laurel Canyon.

John Davis returned to teaching and began to release music again as a solo artist in 2013.

In 2021, the band begun recording new material, and played a small acoustic set live. They also released an expanded edition of the Walk Through This World EP on Bandcamp on September 11, 2021. The following year, the band released the "Feel It If You Feel It" single, followed by the It Just Goes With EP in March 2023, and it was their first new material in nearly 20 years. A few months later, Folk Implosion released Music for Kids. It consisted of the band's contributions to the Kids soundtrack in addition to other songs recorded during the same era.

== Discography ==
=== Albums ===
- Take a Look Inside (Communion Label, 1994)
- Dare to Be Surprised (Communion Label, 1997)
- One Part Lullaby (Interscope, 1999)
- The New Folk Implosion (Domino, 2003)
- Walk Thru Me (Joyful Noise, 2024)

=== Singles and EPs ===
- Walk Through This World with the Folk Implosion cassette (Chocolate Monk, 1993)
- Walk Through This World with the Folk Implosion EP (Drunken Fish, 1994)
- "Electric Idiot" (Ubik, 1994)
- "Natural One" (London, 1995) [No. 29 US, No. 4 US Modern Rock, No. 45 UK]
- "Palm of My Hand" (Communion Label, 1995)
- "Pole Position" (Communion Label, 1997)
- "Insinuation" (Communion Label, 1997)
- "Free to Go" (Domino, 2000) [No. 90 UK]
- "Leaving it Up to Me" (Domino, 2002)
- "Brand of Skin" (Domino, 2003)
- "Pearl" (Domino, 2003)
- "Feel It If You Feel It" (2022)
- It Just Goes With EP (Joyful Noise Recordings, 2023)

=== Compilations ===
- The Folk Implosion (EP) (Communion Label, 1996)
- Music for Kids (Domino, 2023)

=== Other appearances ===
- "Kingdom of Lies," a song on the A Life Less Ordinary Soundtrack (1997)
