= Yoad Nevo =

Record producer and mix engineer

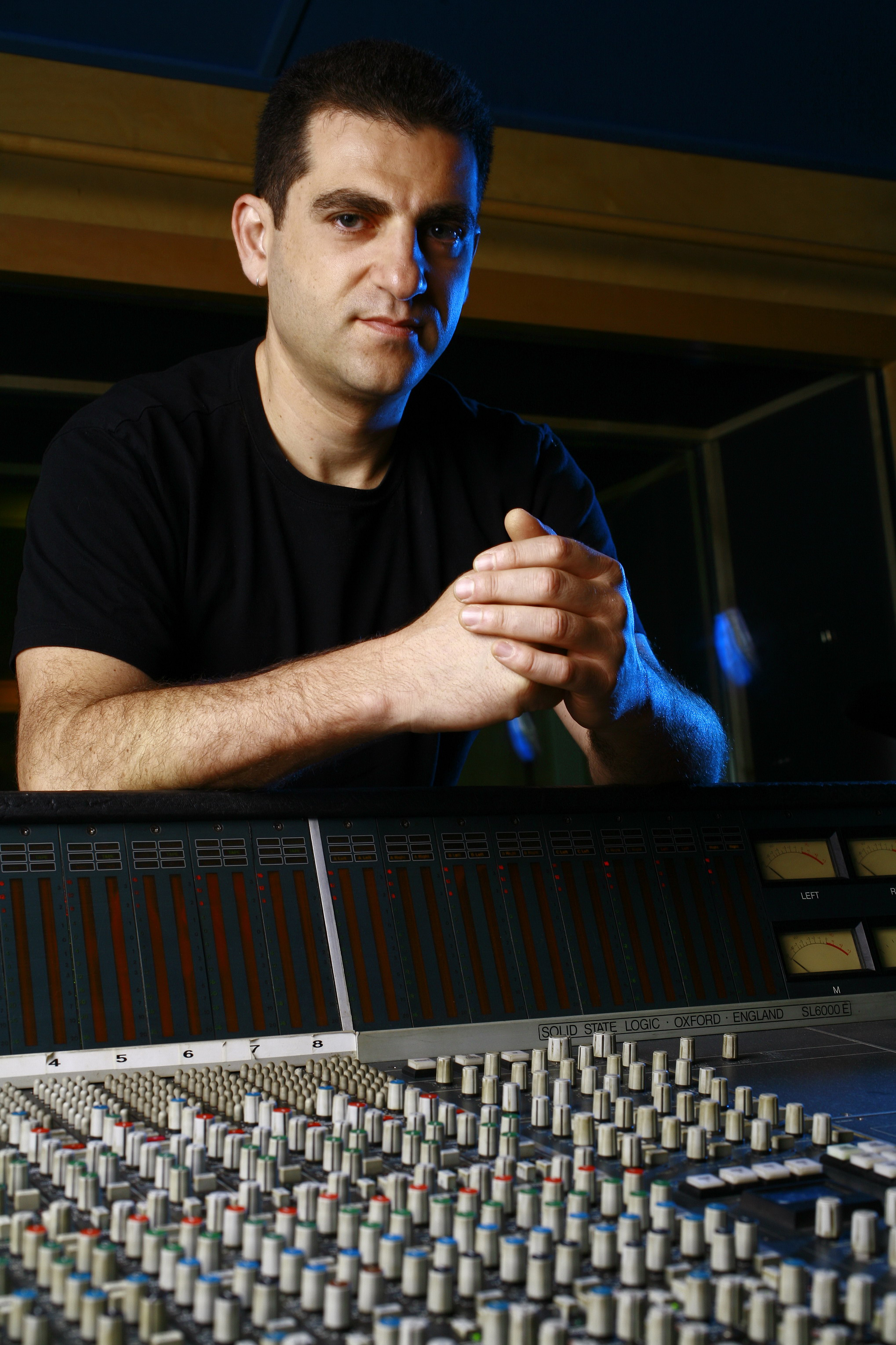

Background information
- Genres: Electronic; synth-pop; trip hop
- Occupations: Record producer; mix engineer
- Instruments: Guitar; bass; keyboard; percussion
- Labels: Columbia; Universal; EMI; RCA; Sony BMG; Island; Polydor; Decca
- Website: yoadnevo.com

Yoad Nevo is a Multi Platinum Producer and Mixer known for his work with Sia, Ed Sheeran, Giggs, Jem, Pet Shop Boys, Bryan Adams, Girls Aloud, Sugababes, The Dandy Warhols, Goldfrapp, Sophie Ellis-Bextor, Moby, Air, Morcheeba, amongst others. He is also the owner of Nevo Sound Studios in London, and the Product Manager, co-inventor of pro audio plugins for Waves Audio.

== History ==
Nevo started his career in music at age 10, playing guitar and exploring electronic instruments and at the age of 17 has started working in professional recording studios. During 1998–2005 Nevo worked at Townhouse Studios and Olympic Studios alongside Mark Stent, Hugh Padgham and Jeremy Wheatley. Nevo designed and launched his own studio complex, ‘Nevo Sound Studios’, in 2005.

== Projects ==
Nevo is perhaps best known for his work with Sia, Giggs, Jem, Bryan Adams, Girls Aloud and Sugababes. Has also worked on releases by Duran Duran, Dave Gahan, Air, Moby, Alesha Dixon, Sophie Ellis-Bextor, Ronan Keating, Mark Owen, Arthur Baker and others. He has collaborated on several productions (Pet Shop Boys, Alesha Dixon, Gabriella Climi) with production team Xenomania. His production style can be defined by prominent beat, big synth sounds and his technique can be characterized as analogue/digital hybrid.

Nevo is the co-inventor of many audio processing plugins, some of them patented, and has worked with Waves Audio on much of their product line since 1997. Waves Audio received a technical Grammy Award in 2011, for making contributions of outstanding technical significance to the recording field.

In 2012 Waves Audio released the 'NLS Non-Linear Summing Plugin, which modeled Nevo's Neve console, along with Mark 'Spike' Stent's SSL console, and Mike Hedges' EMI desk.

Nevo is also a busy mastering engineer who's mastered thousands of songs as well as developed industry standard mastering tools such as Waves Masters Bundle. In January 2012 Nevo launched an online-mastering service 'Nevo Mastering'.

Nevo has written a book, Hit Record - An Inside Track to Music Production, published worldwide and distributed by Hal Leonard. in 2007 'Hit Record was later translated to Japanese and released in Japan. It describes the methods of work and offers insight to his approach to production and mixing.

== Partial discography ==
- 2015 - Sia - Salted Wound - Fifty Shades of Grey
- 2014 - Dino Merlin - Hotel Nacional (Magaza, Croatia Records)
- 2014 - Left Boy - Permanent Midnight (Warner Music)
- 2013 - Lena Meyer-Landrut - Neon (Lonely People) (Universal Music)
- 2013 - Glasperlenspiel - Grenzenlos (Polydor)
- 2012 - Chima - Stille (Island Records)
- 2011 - Barbarellas - Night Mode (Ceol Music)
- 2013 - Giggs - Let Em Ave It (XL Recordings)
- 2010 - Tina Karol - 9 Lives (Astra Records)
- 2009 - Pet Shop Boys – Yes (Parlophone)
- 2008 - Girls Aloud - Out of Control (Polydor)
- 2008 - Alesha Dixon - The Alesha Show (Asylum Records)
- 2007 - Sugababes Vs Girls Aloud – Walk This Way (Polydor, Island Records)
- 2006 - My Toys Like Me (Aluna George) - Sick Couple Dumb Angel
- 2005 - Bond - Explosive: The Best of Bond
- 2005 - Liset Alea - No Sleep (EMI)
- 2004 - Bryan Adams - Room Service (Polydor)
- 2004 - Jem - Finally Woken (ATO)
- 2004 - Goldfrapp – Strict Machine (Mute)
- 2004 - Duran Duran – Astronaut (Epic)
- 2004 - Air – Surfing on a Rocket (Astralwerks)
- 2004 - McFly – Room on the Third Floor (Universal)
- 2003 - Ronan Keating – The Long Goodbye (Universal)
- 2003 - Sugababes - Freak Like Me (Island Records)
- 2003 - The Dandy Warhols - Welcome to the Monkey House (Parlophone)
- 2003 - Dave Gahan – I Need You (Reprise Records)
- 2003 - The Bangles – Something That You Said (EMI)
- 2003 - Moby feat. Princess Superstar - Jam for the Ladies (EMI)
- 2002 - Sophie Ellis-Bextor - Read My Lips (Polydor)
- 2002 - Sugababes – Freak Like Me (Universal)
- 2002 - Sugababes – Round Round (Universal)
- 2002 - Morcheeba – Way Beyond (Reprise Records)
- 2000 - Bond - Born (Decca)
