= Sebadoh discography =

- Studio albums: 9
- Extended plays: 10
- Compilation albums: 3
- Singles: 13

The discography of American indie rock band Sebadoh includes nine studio albums, three compilation albums, 10 extended plays (including two split 7-inches), and 13 singles.

== Albums ==
=== Studio albums ===
Title	Album details	Peak chart positions						
Title	Album details	US	US Heat.	AUS	BEL	CAN	NOR	UK
The Freed Man	Released: September 1989; Label: Homestead	—	—	—	—	—	—	—
Weed Forestin'	Released: 1990; Label: Homestead	—	—	—	—	—	—	—
Sebadoh III	Released: August 16, 1991; Label: Homestead	—	—	—	—	—	—	—
Bubble & Scrape	Released: April 26, 1993; Label: Sub Pop (SP192)	—	—	—	—	—	—	63
Bakesale	Released: August 23, 1994; Label: Sub Pop (SP260)	—	—	—	—	—	—	40
Harmacy	Released: August 20, 1996; Label: Sub Pop (SP370)	126	3	82	—	44	—	38
The Sebadoh	Released: February 23, 1999; Label: Sire	197	15	—	—	—	34	45
Defend Yourself	Released: September 16, 2013; Label: Joyful Noise	105	1	—	150	—	—	—
Act Surprised	Released: May 24, 2019; Label: Dangerbird	—	4	—	—	—	—	—
"—" denotes a recording that did not chart.

=== Compilation albums ===
Title	Album details
The Freed Weed	Released: 1990; Label: Homestead
Smash Your Head on the Punk Rock	Released: October 1, 1992; Label: Sub Pop (SP176)
Wade Through the Boggs	Released: February 26, 2007; Self-released

== Extended plays ==
=== As sole artist ===
Title	Album details	Peak chart positions
Title	Album details	US Heat.
Asshole	Released: 1990; Label: Vertical (V-003)	—
Gimme Indie Rock	Released: 1991; Label: Homestead (HMS 165–7)	—
Oven Is My Friend	Released: 1991; Label: Siltbreeze (SB 009)	—
Rocking the Forest	Released: 1992; Label: Domino (WIGLP2)	—
Sebadoh vs Helmet	Released: 1992; Label: Domino (WIGLP3)	—
4 Song CD	Released: 1994; Label: Domino (RUG17T)	—
Princess	Released: 1996; Label: Sub Pop (SP367)	—
Secret	Released: 2012; Self-released	28
"—" denotes a recording that did not chart.

=== Collaborations ===
Title	Album details
Split with Big Stick	Released: 1989; Label: Sonic Life (SL-002)
Split with Azalia Snail	Released: 1991; Label: Dark Beloved Cloud (DBC001)

== Singles ==
Title	Year	Peak chart positions			Album
Title	Year	US Alt.	CAN Alt.	UK	Album
"Soul and Fire"	1993	—	—	—	Bubble & Scrape
"Skull"	1994	—	—	84	Bakesale
"Rebound"	1995	—	—	—	Bakesale
"Not Too Amused"	1995	—	—	—	Bakesale
"Beauty of the Ride"	1996	—	—	74	Harmacy
"Ocean"	1996	23	17	—	Harmacy
"Flame"	1999	—	—	30	The Sebadoh
"It's All You"	1999	—	—	88	The Sebadoh
"I Will"	2013	—	—	—	Defend Yourself
"Celebrate the Void"	2019	—	—	—	Act Surprised
"Stunned"	2019	—	—	—	Act Surprised
"Raging River"	2019	—	—	—	Act Surprised
"Sunshine"	2019	—	—	—	Act Surprised
"—" denotes a recording that did not chart.
