= Wendy Fonarow =

American anthropologist and writer

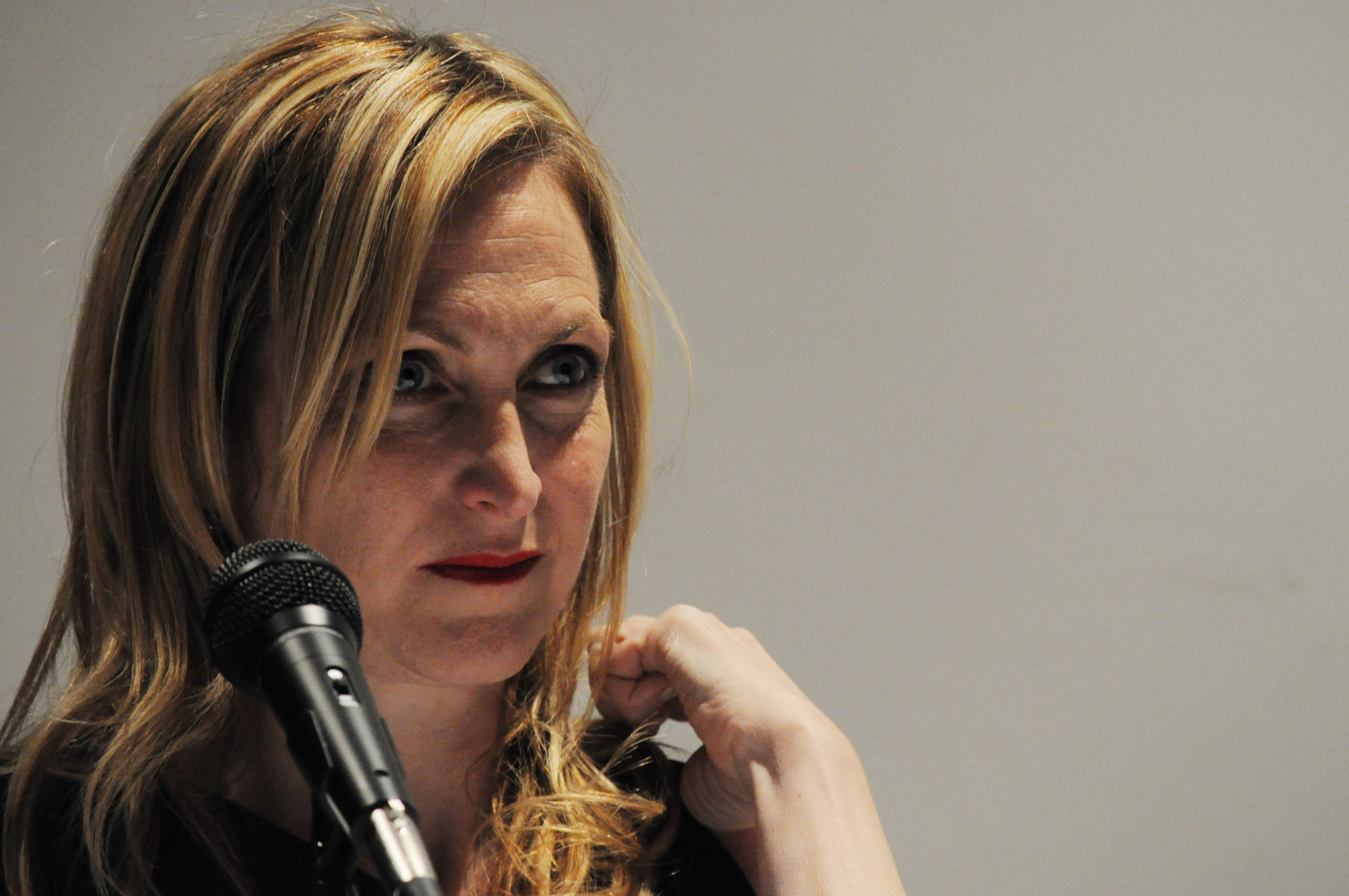
- Fonarow in 2011
- Born: 1969 (age 56–57); Los Angeles, California, United States
- Occupations: Anthropologist, professor, writer, A&R
- Writing career
- Genre: non-fiction
- Website: www.indiegoddess.com

Wendy Fonarow is a Los Angeles-based anthropologist, writer, music industry professional and Professor of Anthropology at Glendale Community College. She is best known for her book Empire of Dirt, one of the first academic monographs on indie music in the context of live concerts. and for her column Ask the Indie Professor in The Guardian. Her areas of expertise include ritual, performance and the music industry.

== Life and career ==
Wendy Fonarow was born in Los Angeles and studied applied mathematics and anthropology at University of California, San Diego, where she also worked at the campus radio station KSDT. At the time the station featured post-punk British bands and underground dance music. Milo Aukerman of the Descendants also attended UCSD at the same time. The band covered the Beach Boys' song "Wendy" for her. The song was later included on The Descendant's album Enjoy!

After graduating, she continued to attend concerts in Los Angeles. In 1989, Fonarow attended the first Reading festival with a new promoter the Mean Fiddler. Mean Fiddler's participation changed the direction of the festival from heavy rock to the burgeoning genre of indie music. As an American, she was unable to purchase tickets internationally and was therefore added to the guest list of the Irish band, Something Happens who gave her backstage access. Her experiences at this indie music festival eventually became the inspiration for her PhD thesis on indie and live music performance.

She completed her masters research on Contemporary Halloween Practices and went on to research the practices of audiences at UCLA. She is frequently cited in and writes for popular media as an expert on Halloween, music, and pop culture.

In 1993, she arrived in London to begin fieldwork on indie music and live performance and was introduced to Laurence Bell, the founder of Domino Recording Company. Fonarow was subsequently hired as Domino Records first employee. Fonarow worked closely with artists such as Slowdive, Ride and Mogwai in the initial phase of her research and continued to document indie audiences until mobile phones radically changed participation at concerts. She returned to Los Angeles, and between 1995 and 1997 worked at Reprise Records and at MCA Records as a talent scout and A&R manager while continuing to teach Cultural and Linguistic Anthropology at UCLA.

In 1999, she finished her PhD thesis and in 2006 released a book, Empire of Dirt. She has given lectures and keynotes at Cambridge University, Princeton, Columbia University, UCLA, University of Milan, University of Oslo and the University of Edinburgh as well as conferences, including By:Larm, CMJ, SXSW, Music Finland, and EMP in Seattle, NYC, and Los Angeles.

== Bibliography ==
=== Non-fiction ===
- (1995) "The Spatial Organization of the Indie Music Gig" reprinted in The Subcultures Reader, Ken Gelder (Editor), Sarah Thornton (Editor).
- (1996) "Spatial Distribution and Participation in British Contemporary Musical Performances" Issues in Applied Linguistics, 7(1)
- (1999) "The Culture of Participation and the Morality of Aesthetics in British Independent Music Performances" PhD. Diss., University of California at Los Angeles (Ann Arbor: UMI).
- (2006) Empire of Dirt: The Aesthetics and Rituals of British Indie Music . Paperback: ISBN 978-0-8195-6811-3, Hardcover: ISBN 978-0-8195-6810-6.
- (2008) "Portrait du chercheur en fan", Cairn.info
- (2009)Review Encyclopedia of Indie Rock, Popular Music. Volume 28 Special Issue: 3, October 2009, pp 457 – 459. IASPM International
- (2012)Review Cultural Seeds: Essays on the Work of Nick Cave, Popular Music. IASPM International Volume 31 Issue 1, January 2012 pp181 – 183.
- (2012) "Moshing" Grove Dictionary of American Music, Second Edition. London: Oxford University Press 2012.
- (2014) “These New Puritans: The Smiths and the Provenance of Indie Music,” in The Smiths, edited by Fernandez, F. Madrid: Errata Naturae. .
- (2015) "Babes in Toyland Return as Ferocious as Ever at Los Angeles Comeback Show" Rolling Stone, February 13, 2015
- (2016) Cultural Seeds: Essays on the Work of Nick Cave, written by Tanya Dalziell, edited by Karen Welberry
- (2017) "The Princes of Indie City," in Sometimes These Words Just Don't Have to Be Said, edited by Peter Solowka, P. and Charman, S. London: Red Planet Books.

== Influence ==
- Google Scholar finds 235 citations of her book and 31 citations of her 1995 article (as of December 2018).
- She suggested the name of the band Mojave 3 inspired by the Mojave Desert near Los Angeles
- Sebadoh's "Secret EP" and Album "Defend Yourself" were recorded in Wendy Fonarow's Indietopia Music Studio in Adams Hill, CA.
