= Sebadoh vs Helmet =

EP by Sebadoh
- Released: 1992
- Recorded: Slaughterhouse, Calgary, AB
- Genre: Indie rock, lo-fi
- Length: 26:10
- Label: Domino
- Producer: Bob Weston, Brian Fellows

Sebadoh chronology
Rocking the Forest (1992)	Sebadoh vs Helmet (1992)	Smash Your Head on the Punk Rock (1992)

Sebadoh vs Helmet is an EP by Sebadoh, released in 1992.

Three songs (#2, #5 & #9) are re-recordings of songs previously released on Sebadoh's two first albums (The Freed Man and Weed Forestin'). All songs but one song (#9: "Soulmate") were included on the compilation Smash Your Head on the Punk Rock. The German version of this EP (released in 1992 on CD, LP and MC by City Slang) included the entire Rocking the Forest EP as bonus tracks.

== Track listing ==
1. "Notsur Dnuora Selcric" - 3:03
2. "Brand New Love" - 4:04
3. "Mean Distance" - 3:11
4. "...Burned" (The Byrds cover) - 3:16
5. "New Worship" - 2:19
6. "Good Things, Proud Man" - 1:26
7. "P. Moon" (Nick Drake cover) - 1:59
8. "Cecilia Chime in Melee" - 4:18
9. "Soulmate" - 2:28
- Tracks 2, 5, 6 & 9 written by Lou Barlow
- Tracks 3 & 8 written by Eric Gaffney
- Track 1 written by Jason Loewenstein

== Personnel ==
Sebadoh

- Lou Barlow - guitar, vocals, bass on "Mean Distance"
- Eric Gaffney - Drums, guitar, bass, keyboards, percussion, vocals on "Mean Distance"
- Jason Loewenstein - Bass, vocals, drums on "Cecilia Chime in Melee"

Technical personnel

- Bob Weston - production
- Brian Fellows - production
- Lauren Thomas - photography
