= Pitchfork Music Festival 2008 =

Music festival

- Dates: July 18–20, 2008
- Locations: Union Park, Chicago, United States
- Website: pitchforkmusicfestival.com

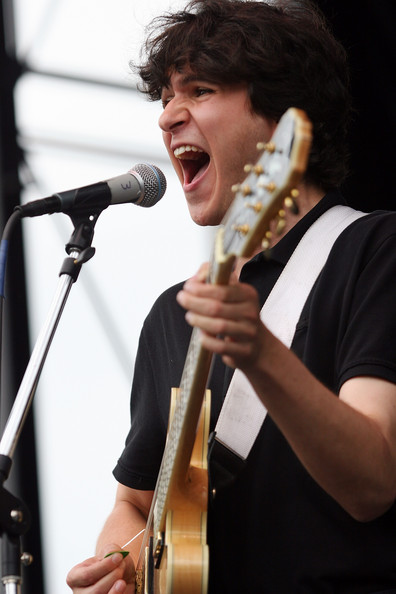
Ezra at Pitchfork Festival 2008

The Pitchfork Music Festival 2008 was held on July 18 to 20, 2008 at the Union Park, Chicago, United States.

In that year, Pitchfork partnered up with promotion companies All Tomorrow's Parties to present a Don't Look Back stage, on which all of the bands performed one of their classic albums in its entirety on Friday.

== Lineup ==
Artists listed from latest to earliest set times.

Aluminum Stage
Friday, July 18	Saturday, July 19	Sunday, July 20
Public Enemy (Note: Public Enemy performed a full set of their sophomore studio album It Takes a Nation of Millions to Hold Us Back.)	Animal Collective; The Hold Steady; Vampire Weekend; Fleet Foxes; Jay Reatard	Spoon; Spiritualized; The Dodos; The Apples in Stereo; Dirty Projectors

Connector Stage
Friday, July 18	Saturday, July 19	Sunday, July 20
Sebadoh (Note: Sebadoh performed a full set of their fourth studio album Bubble & Scrape.); Mission of Burma (Note: Mission of Burma performed a full set of their debut studio album Vs..)	Jarvis Cocker !!! Dizzee Rascal; Caribou; Titus Andronicus	Dinosaur Jr. M. Ward; Les Savy Fav; Boris; Times New Viking

Balance Stage
Saturday, July 19	Sunday, July 20
No Age; Atlas Sound; Extra Golden; Elf Power; The Ruby Suns; Fuck Buttons; Icy Demons; A Hawk and a Hacksaw; Boban i Marko Marković Orkestar	Cut Copy; Bradford Cox/King Khan/Jay Reatard Impromptu Jam Session; Bon Iver; Ghostface Killah & Raekwon; Occidental Brothers Dance Band International; King Khan and the Shrines; HEALTH; High Places; Mahjongg
