= Weed Forestin' =

Studio album (home-recorded album) by Sebadoh
- Released: 1990
- Recorded: 1986–1987
- Genre: Lo-fi
- Label: Homestead
- Producer: Lou Barlow

Sebadoh chronology
| The Freed Man (1989) | Weed Forestin' (1990) | The Freed Weed (1990) |

Weed Forestin is the second studio album by the American indie rock band Sebadoh. It was originally self-released by Barlow on cassette in 1987, under the Sentridoh name, the solo home-recording project of American rock musician and Sebadoh member Lou Barlow, and sold at record stores in his native Massachusetts in an approximate run of 100.

In 1990, it was officially released by Homestead on vinyl and cassette under the name of Barlow's newly formed band Sebadoh. Later that year it was re-released on CD by Homestead on the Sebadoh compilation album The Freed Weed, which also contains a number of songs from the band's debut album, The Freed Man (1989).

In 2012, the album was again self-released under the Sentridoh name, in a number of formats on the website Bandcamp, including CD, vinyl, cassette and digital download.

The album was named after a lyric in the Barlow song "Lose," which was not included in Weed Forestin but reworked into a Dinosaur Jr. song on their 1987 album, You're Living All Over Me. In his July 2011 newsletter, Barlow explained that "i was -not- high on marijuana when i recorded this.. 'weed forestin' meant making the most out of what i had, foresting weeds instead of trees."

== Background ==
Weed Forestin' was recorded in 1986 and 1987, when Barlow was the bassist of the American indie rock band Dinosaur Jr. Sebadoh, which Barlow co-founded with Eric Gaffney, started as a songwriting outlet for Barlow outside of Dinosaur Jr, whose lead singer and guitarist, J. Mascis, Barlow would later publicly clash with. Around the time when Barlow was working on Weed Forestin', Dinosaur were recording their earliest releases in professional studios. Barlow found said studios so uncomfortable that he opted to record Weed Forestin' at home.

== Recording and music ==
Recorded on a 4-track in the basement of his parents' home, Weed Forestin' features Barlow on a Stella acoustic guitar, an acoustic baritone ukulele, and vocals. Gaffney plays percussion on the songs "New Worship," "More Simple," "Ride the Darker Wave" and "I Can't See." Several tracks are linked together by tape samples and collages.

Many of the songs deal with Barlow's low self-esteem and Mascis' often cruel demeanor, and see the songwriter writing with himself as the intended audience. According to Barlow:

"[Mascis] was just this enormous figure to me at the time – he was a genius! He was fucking writing these incredible songs… in his mind all this shit was coming together and I was just kind of following in his wake. But he was just really not into me. So I'm with this person and really creatively wrapped up in what he’s doing and in love with him as a creative being. (...) I was just trying to hold on.

It was like, how can I hold on to this situation without losing my mind? Because he was really… just fuckin' tough. He was a tough guy to hang out with because he was pretty cruel. It was amazing; he could just fuckin' cut you down and leave you there. I wanted so desperately to hold on to him because of what I was experiencing creatively and how amazing it was, but emotionally I wanted to survive it.

So a lot of those songs are writing to explain something to myself that he himself couldn't explain to me. I'm putting myself in his position and explaining it to myself so I could just hold on and make it through what was a really tough period… [so as] not to feel totally emotional rejected and devastated by the whole situation. Not squashed, basically. I was in a precarious situation of either having all my confidence stomped out of me or figuring out a way to hold on to what I knew was good about what I did and how it could become better."

Weed Forestin', like The Freed Man, epitomizes the lo-fi aesthetic that Sebadoh helped popularize in the indie rock scene of the early 1990s, with their landmark album Sebadoh III (1991). However, the recording quality of these two albums is lower than any subsequent Sebadoh albums.

Weed Forestin' is the most Barlow-centric of any Sebadoh release – more so than The Freed Man, which was recorded in 1988 and features a number of Gaffney's songs. If seen as a Sentridoh album, however, Weed Forestin is unique in that it contains consistent contributions from another Sebadoh member in Gaffney.

Sebadoh became a three-piece in 1989 with the arrival of Jason Loewenstein, and all future Sebadoh albums feature songwriting contributions from Barlow, Loewenstein and other members, including Gaffney until his departure in 1994. Following Sebadoh's evolution into a traditional band in the early 1990s, Barlow continued to release home recordings under the Sentridoh name.

== Reception and legacy ==
Professional ratings
Review scores
| Source | Rating |
|---|---|
| AllMusic | 2/5 stars |
| Pitchfork | 8.2/10 |

Allmusic's Richie Unterberger praised the album for Barlow's "appealing voice, sensitive wit, and knack for affected burned-out acid-folk," but wrote "the merits are often buried beneath hiss and tomfoolery, as if [Barlow] wasn't convinced his music was any good on its own terms, and so tried to pretend it was all a joke."

However, in a 2004 interview with The Onion, Barlow said that he "really worked on" his early home recordings, citing Weed Forestin' and his Sentridoh material in particular, but "realized that in the end, because it was [recorded] on four-track cassette, a large group of people weren't going to take it seriously. But that was all I had, you know? If we'd had Pro Tools when I was 21? With that kind of energy, and those kind of ideas just fuckin' rushing at me? I could've made something that didn't have tape hiss on it, so people would think it was "legitimate."

The album was well-reviewed upon its reissue in 2012. Pitchfork's Mark Richardson questioned "whether a 25-year-old album of home-recorded indie folk...[has] anything special to say in 2012 that isn't being said by the thousands of home-recording kids currently on the cusp of turning 21?" and concluded that "Weed Forestin' holds up very well, and represents a sort of ideal for what a home-recorded singer-songwriter record might be."

These recordings gained Barlow support from Sonic Youth. Sonic Youth's drummer, Steve Shelley, released the Sentridoh single "Losercore" on his Smells Like Records label in 1990.

Three songs from the album – "It's So Hard to Fall in Love," "Brand New Love" and "I Believe in Fate" – were covered by the American indie rock band Superchunk on their 1991 EP, The Freed Seed.

British artist Daryl Waller made a short film for the album independently, and mailed it to Barlow in the early 2000s. It features hand-drawn stop motion videos for the songs "Temporary Dream," "It's So Hard to Fall in Love," "Perfect Power" and "Brand New Love." The film was included in the album's 2012 re-release.

== Reissue ==
On February 14, 2012, the album was again self-released under the Sentridoh name on the website Bandcamp. It was made available for pre-order on February 4, and instantly became the website's number one seller. The release had a run of 1,300 units, including 1,000 vinyl records (of which 150 were special editions that came with a USB drive including bonus music and a hand-drawn short film by artist Daryl Waller), 150 double CD packages, and 150 cassette tapes. The release was spearheaded by Maxwell Wood.

The 2012 release was remastered from the original 4-track cassette tapes, showing the album as it was originally intended by Barlow. In a 2011 interview, Barlow stated that the first mastering sessions for the album was a "hatchet job."

The reissue includes Child of the Apocalypse, a collection of bonus material including alternative takes, lengthy tapes collages and songs that didn't make the original record.

== Track listing ==
=== Weed Forestin' ===
1. "Temporary Dream"
2. "New Worship"
3. "Subtle Holy Gift"
4. "My Own Religion"
5. "Ride the Darker Wave"
6. "More Simple"
7. "Jealous of Jesus"
8. "Mr. Genius Eyes"
9. "Perfect Power"
10. "Feeding Evil"
11. "Sexual Confusion"
12. "Three Times a Day"
13. "Gate to Hell"
14. "Broken"
15. "Whitey Peach"
16. "I Can't See"
17. "Take My Hand"
18. "Pound My Skinny Head"
19. "I Believe in Fate"
20. "Waited Forever"
21. "Slightest Suggestion"
22. "It's So Hard to Fall in Love"
23. "Brand New Love"

=== Child of the Apocalypse (2012 reissue) ===
1. "Poledo (unedited collage)"
2. "Poledo (unlayered)"
3. "Untitled Strumental"
4. "My Own Religion (unlayered)"
5. "I Believe in Fate (version I)"
6. "Take My Hand (noises)"
7. "Take My Hand (strumental)"
8. "Mr. Genius Eyes (alternate)"
9. "Columbus (vocals)"
10. "Sexual Confusion (alternate)"
11. "Rumble and Squeak"
12. "Sacred Attention (version I)"
13. "Sacred Attention (strumental)"
14. "Broken (drums/voice)"
15. "It's So Hard (alternate)"
16. "Never Jealous (version I)"
17. "HN II"
18. "Brand New Love (strumental)"
