= 4 Song CD =

EP by Sebadoh
- Released: 1994
- Genre: Indie rock
- Length: 22:41
- Label: Domino
- Producer: Tim O'Heir

Sebadoh chronology
Bakesale (1994)	4 Song CD (1994)

Professional ratings
Review scores
Source	Rating
AllMusic	2/5 stars

4 Song CD is an EP by Sebadoh, released in 1994.

== Track listing ==
1. "Mor Backlash"
2. "Rebound"
3. "Not a Friend"
4. "Careful"
5. "Foreground"
6. "Naima"
7. "40203"
8. "Mystery Man"
9. "Drumstick Jumble"
10. "Lime Kiln"
