= Harmacy =

Coordinates: 52.5161369°N 7.8895068°W

Studio album by Sebadoh
- Released: August 20, 1996
- Genre: Indie rock
- Length: 50:12
- Label: Sub Pop (USA); Domino (UK); City Slang (Germany); Fellaheen (Australia)
- Producer: Wally Gagel, Bryce Goggin, Eric Masunaga, Tim O'Heir

Sebadoh chronology
Bakesale (1994)	Harmacy (1996)	The Sebadoh (1999)

Professional ratings
Review scores
Source	Rating
AllMusic	4/5 stars
Entertainment Weekly	B−
The Guardian	4/5 stars
Los Angeles Times	3.5/4 stars
NME	6/10
Pitchfork	8.9/10
Q	4/5 stars
Rolling Stone	4/5 stars
Spin	8/10
The Village Voice	A−

Harmacy is the sixth album by American indie rock band Sebadoh. It was released by Sub Pop in 1996.

It is the second and final Sebadoh album to feature drummer Bob Fay, who replaced founding member Eric Gaffney in 1994.

The album cover features a photograph of a pharmacy in Cashel, Ireland, taken by band member Jason Loewenstein on tour. The missing "P" gave the album its title.

== Music ==
As with its predecessor, Bakesale, the songwriting on Harmacy was handled primarily by Loewenstein and founding member Lou Barlow, with Fay contributing the lone track, "Sforzando!", and the band covering "I Smell a Rat" by American hard rock band The Bags. Their cover was featured on the soundtrack for the 1998 American comedy-thriller film Homegrown.

Like Bakesale, the album was a "(relatively) polished production", and featured pervasive use of electric guitars and longer song structures, marking a clear departure from the band's lo-fi, often acoustic earlier albums like their release, Sebadoh III (1991).

Solo acoustic versions of "On Fire" and "Willing to Wait" were released prior to the album's release, on the 1994 "Rebound" single and the 1995 compilation Rare on Air, Volume 2: KCRW Live, respectively.

== Reception ==
Released in the wake of Barlow's Top 40 hit, "Natural One", with his band The Folk Implosion, Harmacy became Sebadoh's first charting album in the U.S., expanding on the success of Bakesale, and yielding the Modern Rock Tracks hit, "Ocean".

The album was well received by critics, albeit less so than Bakesale. Stephen Thompson of The Onion's The A.V. Club wrote that Harmacy "doesn't have Bakesale's considerable staying power as a whole, but the strong balance of soft pop songs ("Too Pure", "Perfect Way", the elegant pop ballad "Willing to Wait") and abrasively punky rock songs ("Love To Fight", "Mind Reader", "Can't Give Up") still holds together somehow."

Harmacy was included on several year-end lists in 1996, including Rolling Stone' "Ten Best Albums" (#8), the Village Voice's "Pazz & Jop Critics' Poll" (#36), and the NME's critics' poll (#38).

== Proposed reissue ==
The album was supposed to be reissued in 2011, along with Bakesale, but never was. In a 2012 interview with blurredvisionary, Barlow explained, "[T]hey wanted me to [reissue Harmacy] and I absolutely don’t want to pursue it at all. I just can’t get excited about that record...I think anyone can find it and I don’t know how we could improve upon it unless we included the b-sides from that time, but the b-sides we did from that time I don’t know they were that great."

[Harmacy] was a real heartbreaker. It was meant to be the triumphant follow-up to Bakesale, but in reality Sub Pop put an enormous amount of money into that record and they put us in a studio and immediately the guy we were working with was like, "You've got to fire your drummer." And I was just like, "Oh fuck." He was telling us that the songs would never really explode unless we got a different drummer, which put us in the position of making this really difficult decision which, of course, we didn’t make. The drummer stayed. And sure enough, the record just really didn’t take off the way it should have and then Sub Pop pretty much completely shit itself not too long afterwards. . . They were trying to behave like a major label around that time, hiring tons of major label people and spending shit tons of money on records like Harmacy and whatever Supersuckers were doing at the time. They just hemorrhaged money and then we kind of ended up being responsible for it. And now when I listen to that record I just hear the voice of our fucking producer saying "These songs will never take off." There are some songs on that record that I love and I really did do my best, but I listen to it and I think, "Yep, those songs really never took off the way they could have."

— Lou Barlow, Stereogum interview, August 2012

== Track listing ==
1. "On Fire" (Barlow) – 3:36
2. "Prince-S" (Loewenstein) – 2:52
3. "Ocean" (Barlow) – 2:46
4. "Nothing Like You" (Loewenstein) – 3:09
5. "Crystal Gypsy" (Loewenstein) – 1:29
6. "Beauty of the Ride" (Barlow) – 2:48
7. "Mind Reader" (Loewenstein) – 1:50
8. "Sforzando!" (Fay) – 3:30
9. "Willing to Wait" (Barlow) – 3:32
10. "Hillbilly II" (Loewenstein) – 1:59
11. "Zone Doubt" (Loewenstein) – 2:18
12. "Too Pure" (Barlow) – 3:46
13. "Worst Thing" (Loewenstein) – 2:55
14. "Love to Fight" (Loewenstein) – 0:54
15. "Perfect Way" (Barlow) – 2:49
16. "Can't Give Up" (Loewenstein) – 2:02
17. "Open Ended" (Barlow) – 3:28
18. "Weed Against Speed" (Barlow) – 2:55
19. "I Smell a Rat" (Jon Hardy, Jim Janota, Crispin Wood) – 1:34

== Personnel ==
- Lou Barlow – lead vocals (tracks 1, 3, 6, 9, 12, 15, 17, 18), guitar (tracks 1, 3, 5, 6, 8, 9, 12, 15, 17, 18), bass (tracks 2, 4, 7, 10, 11, 13, 14, 16), mellotron (tracks 9, 12, 17), synthesizer (track 1)
- Jason Loewenstein – lead vocals (tracks 2, 4, 5, 7, 10, 11, 13, 14, 16), guitar (tracks 2, 4, 7, 10, 11, 13, 14, 16), bass (tracks 1, 3, 5, 6, 9, 12, 17), drums (tracks 8, 15, 18, 19)
- Bob Fay – drums (tracks 1–7, 9–14, 16, 17), bass (tracks 8, 15, 18), lead vocals (track 19)

Additional personnel

- Mark Perretta – lead guitar and bass (track 19)
- Eric Masunaga – engineer (tracks 2, 7, 8, 13, 15, 16, 18, 19), mixing (tracks 2, 8, 13, 15, 18, 19)
- Tim O'Heir – engineer (tracks 1, 3–6, 9–12, 14, 17), mixing (tracks 1, 3–6, 9–11, 14, 17)
- Bryce Goggin – mixing (tracks 7, 12, 16)
- Charles Peterson – photography

== Charts ==
=== Album ===
Chart performance for Harmacy
Chart (1996)	Peak position
Australian Albums (ARIA)	82
UK Albums (OCC)	38
US Billboard 200	126

=== Singles ===
Year	Song	Chart	Position
1996	Beauty of the Ride	UK Singles Chart	No. 74
1996	Ocean	Modern Rock Tracks (US)	No. 23
1996	Ocean	UK Singles Chart	No. 146
