= Smash Your Head on the Punk Rock =

Compilation album by Sebadoh
- Released: October 1, 1992
- Recorded: December 1991 – June 1992
- Genres: Indie rock, lo-fi
- Length: 38:22
- Label: Sub Pop
- Producer: Bob Weston

Sebadoh chronology
Sebadoh III (1991)	Smash Your Head on the Punk Rock (1992)	Bubble & Scrape (1993)

Professional ratings
Review scores
Source	Rating
AllMusic	3.5/5 stars
Chicago Tribune	3.5/4 stars
Robert Christgau	(dud)
The Encyclopedia of Popular Music	3/5 stars
MusicHound Rock: The Essential Album Guide	3/5 stars
The New Rolling Stone Album Guide	4/5 stars
Spin Alternative Record Guide	8/10

Smash Your Head on the Punk Rock is a compilation album by the American indie rock band Sebadoh. It was released in 1992, and marked the band's debut on Sub Pop.

It includes four of the eight songs from their Rocking the Forest EP, and eight of the nine songs from their Sebadoh vs Helmet EP. Both EPs were released in Europe on Domino/20/20 Recordings in early 1992. Eric Gaffney contributed the majority of the album artwork, and the title, which was lifted for a SPIN article on Nirvana in 1994, and was taken for a book title of the same name, by Matt Bissonnette.

"Vampire" was released as the compilation's single.

== Critical reception ==
Rob Sheffield, in The New Rolling Stone Album Guide, called "Brand New Love" one of Barlow's best songs, and an "anthemic losercore ballad."

== Track listing ==
1. "Cry Sis" (Gaffney) - 2:52 *
2. "Brand New Love" (Barlow) - 4:04
3. "Notsur Dnuora Selcric" (Loewenstein) - 3:04
4. "Vampire" (Barlow) - 2:43 *
5. "Good Things" (Barlow) - 1:26
6. "Cecilia Chime in Melee" (Gaffney) - 4:19
7. "Everybody's Been Burned" (David Crosby) 3:15
8. "Junk Bonds" - (Loewenstein) 1:53 *
9. "New Worship" (Barlow) - 2:21
10. "Mean Distance" (Gaffney) - 3:12
11. "Pink Moon" (Nick Drake) - 2:02
12. "Mind Meld" (Fay) - 7:10 *

An asterisk (*) denotes tracks taken from Rocking the Forest.

== Personnel ==
- Lou Barlow - Guitar, Vocals, Bass
- Jason Loewenstein - Bass, Drums, Vocals, Guitar
- Eric Gaffney - Guitar, Vocal, Drums, Bass, Synthesizer
- Bob Fay - Drums, Guitar, Vocals
- Recorded by Bob Weston
