= Perfect Way (disambiguation) =

"Perfect Way" is a song and single by Scritti Politti from their 1985 album Cupid & Psyche 85.

Perfect Way may also refer to:

- "Perfect Way", instrumental version of the same song by Miles Davis from the 1986 album Tutu
- "Perfect Way", a song by Sebadoh from their 1996 album Harmacy
