= Bakesale =

Studio album by Sebadoh
- Released: August 23, 1994
- Recorded: 1993/1994
- Genre: Indie rock
- Length: 41:51
- Labels: Sub Pop (US); Domino (UK); City Slang (Germany)
- Producer: Tim O'Heir

Sebadoh chronology
Bubble & Scrape (1993)	Bakesale (1994)	Harmacy (1996)

Bakesale is the fifth album by American indie rock band Sebadoh, released by Sub Pop in 1994. It was the first Sebadoh album released following the departure of founding member, Eric Gaffney, though he did drum on four of the album's tracks from a session engineered by Bob Weston. Tara Jane O'Neil contributed drums to three tracks. Bob Fay, who had previously filled in for Gaffney, officially joined the band for this record. The cover is a photograph of Lou Barlow, one year old, taken by his mother. The back cover features Bob Fay in his childhood, along with his two brothers. For the reissue, the can of Comet (originally sitting on the toilet tank) was airbrushed out of the cover.

== Recording ==
Initial sessions for the album were done at Steve Albini's home in Chicago, Illinois with Bob Weston, though the band didn't work with Albini. Four songs were recorded with Gaffney, which became his final recordings with the band. Further sessions were held at Fort Apache Studios in Boston, Massachusetts after Gaffney had quit and been replaced by Fay.

== Music ==
As a result of Gaffney's departure, the songwriting on Bakesale was handled primarily by Barlow and Loewenstein, with Fay contributing the lone track, "Temptation Tide". The album continues the band's departure from the largely acoustic, lo-fi sound and shorter song structures that characterized their first three albums, and boasts a more polished production value than previous Sebadoh albums. This helped the band not only expand its underground following but flirt with mainstream success, and several singles and even a few music videos were released from the album.

== Reception ==
Professional ratings
Review scores
Source	Rating
AllMusic	4.5/5 stars
The Austin Chronicle	4/5 stars
The A.V. Club	A−
Christgau's Consumer Guide	A
Los Angeles Times	3/4 stars
Pitchfork	8.5/10
Q	4/5 stars
Rolling Stone	4/5 stars
The Rolling Stone Album Guide	4/5 stars
Spin Alternative Record Guide	9/10

Bakesale was initially well received by critics. It was included in a number of year-end lists in 1994, including Spin's "20 Best Albums of '94" (No. 16), the Village Voice's "1994 Pazz & Jop Critics Poll" (No. 20), the NME's "25 Best Albums of 1994" (No. 27), and Mojo's "25 Best Albums of 1994" (unranked).

In the years since its release, Bakesale has come to be regarded as Sebadoh's most accessible album, with a more polished production than previous Sebadoh albums, and consistent songwriting from Barlow and Loewenstein. Upon its re-release in 2011, Jess Harvell of Pitchfork called it "their most focused and purely pleasurable record", and "a strong and lovable essay on 90s indie's charms". Zachary Houle of PopMatters called it "a totemic touchstone of a record, one that is arguably as important to the development of indie-rock as a form as Guided by Voices' Bee Thousand and Pavement's Crooked Rain, Crooked Rain." In 2014, John Everhart of Stereogum wrote that the album "doesn't have the highs of Bubble & Scrape, nor the epochal status of Sebadoh III, but Bakesale is the [Sebadoh] record you'll find yourself captivated by most immediately, listening to from start to finish."

Barlow himself wrote that Bakesale seems to be "the most fondly remembered and the most highly regarded" Sebadoh album, though he doesn't consider it the band's best, calling it less interesting than Sebadoh III, Bubble & Scrape and The Sebadoh.

In July 2008, it was listed by Pitchfork as one of the publication's 20 favorite Sub Pop albums, with Stuart Berman writing that it represented "a long overdue document of the band's pop prowess" for many longtime fans. In July 2014, Guitar World placed Bakesale at number 37 in their "Superunknown: 50 Iconic Albums That Defined 1994" list.

== Singles ==
"Rebound" was released as the album's first single in 1994, as a 7" vinyl record in the UK. The second single was for the song "Skull", released in 1994 as a 7" in the US and as a CD in the UK, both versions featuring the same three B-sides, but the US version featuring a remixed version of "Skull". The UK releases were handled by Domino, while the US release was put out by Sub Pop.

The following singles, both on CD, were for the songs "Careful", released in 1994 in Germany by City Slang, and "Magnet's Coil", released in 1995 in Australia by Shock. The final single was for the song "Not Too Amused", released in 1995 as a CD and 7" in the UK by Domino. A "Rebound" EP was released by Sub Pop in 1995, featuring different b-sides and cover art from the 1994 UK 7".

== Music videos ==
Music videos were released for the songs "Rebound" and "Skull".

== Reissue ==
The album was reissued in 2011, featuring a second disc of bonus material and new liner notes.

== Track listing ==
1. "License to Confuse" (Barlow) – 1:45
2. "Careful" (Loewenstein) – 2:44
3. "Magnet's Coil" (Barlow) – 2:27
4. "Not a Friend" (Barlow) – 3:40
5. "Not Too Amused" (Loewenstein) – 4:15
6. "Dreams" (Barlow) – 2:39
7. "Skull" (Barlow) – 2:24
8. "Got It" (Loewenstein) – 2:16
9. "S. Soup" (Loewenstein) – 3:16
  - Short for "Shit Soup"
10. "Give Up" (Barlow) – 2:27
11. "Rebound" (Barlow) – 2:12
12. "Mystery Man" (Barlow) – 3:08
13. "Temptation Tide" (Fay) – 1:53
14. "Drama Mine" (Loewenstein) – 2:42
15. "Together or Alone" (Barlow) – 4:03

=== Extra disc (2011 reissue) ===
1. "MOR Backlash"
2. "Not a Friend" (4-track)
3. "Foreground"
4. "40203"
5. "Mystery Man" (4-track)
6. "Drumstick Jumble"
7. "Lime Kiln"
8. "Fancy-ass / Destitute"
9. "Perfect Way" (4-track)
10. "Give the Drummer Some"
11. "Cementville"
12. "Social Medicine"
13. "On Fire" (acoustic)
14. "Magnet's Coil" (acoustic)
15. "Rebound" (acoustic)
16. "Punching Myself in the Face Repeatedly, Publicly"
17. "Sing Something / Plate of Hatred"
18. "III Screams"
19. "Monsoon"
20. "Rainbow Farm"
21. "Hank Williams"
22. "Careful"
23. "Dramamine"
24. "Not Too Amused"
25. "Shit Soup"

== Personnel ==
- Lou Barlow – vocals, guitar, organ
- Jason Loewenstein – vocals, bass guitar, guitar
- Bob Fay – drums, vocals

Additional personnel

- Anne Slinn – vocals, organ
- Eric Gaffney – drums
- Tara O'Neil – drums

== Charts ==
=== Weekly charts ===
Chart (1994)	Peak position
UK Albums Chart	40

=== Singles ===
Year	Song	Chart	Position
1994	"Skull"	UK Singles Chart	84
