= Skull (song) =

Single by Sebadoh

from the album Bakesale
- Released: 1994
- Genre: Indie rock
- Length: 2:24
- Label: Sub Pop; Domino
- Songwriter(s): Lou Barlow
- Producer(s): Tim O'Heir

"Skull" is a song by Sebadoh from their 1994 album Bakesale. It was released as a CD single, and a 7" vinyl record.

A music video was made for the song. It reached number 84 on the UK Singles chart.

== Track listing ==
US 7" Single (SP267)

1. "Skull (remix)"
2. "Punching Myself in the Face Repeatedly, Publicly"
3. "Sing Something"
4. "Plate 'o' Hatred"

UK CD Single (RUG22CD)

1. "Skull"
2. "Punching Myself in the Face Repeatedly, Publicly"
3. "Sing Something"
4. "Plate 'o' Hatred"
