= Princess (EP) =

EP by Sebadoh
- Released: July 1996
- Genre: Indie rock
- Label: Sub Pop
- Producer: Eric Masunaga

Princess is a 7" single by Sebadoh, released in 1996. It was only available by mail-order.

"Princess" (entitled "Prince-S") later appeared on the album Harmacy.

== Track listing ==
1. "Princess"
2. "1/2 Undressed"
3. "Act of Being Polite" (The Residents cover)
4. "Moisture" (The Residents cover)
5. "Suburban Bathers" (The Residents cover)
