= Flame (Sebadoh song) =

Single by Sebadoh

from the album The Sebadoh
- Released: 18 January 1999
- Genre: Alternative rock
- Length: 3:41
- Label: Domino; City Slang; Warner Bros.
- Songwriter: Lou Barlow
- Producers: Eric Masunaga; Rich Costey

"Flame" is a song by Sebadoh from their 1999 album The Sebadoh. It was released on 18 January 1999 as a CD single and 7" vinyl record.

The song peaked at number 30 on the UK Singles chart on 24 January 1999. It is their highest-charting single.

== Track listing ==
UK 7" single (RUG80)

1. "Flame (remix)"
2. "Flame (4-track)"
3. "Sweet Surrender" (John Denver cover)
