= Bubble & Scrape =

Studio album by Sebadoh
- Released: April 26, 1993
- Genre: Indie rock
- Length: 46:48
- Labels: Sub Pop (original US release); Domino (original UK release + 2008 US/UK reissue); City Slang (Germany)
- Producers: Bob Weston; Brian Fellows; Paul McNamara

Sebadoh chronology
Smash Your Head on the Punk Rock (1992)	Bubble & Scrape (1993)	Bakesale (1994)

Bubble & Scrape is the fourth album by American indie rock band Sebadoh. It was released by Sub Pop in April 1993.

Bubble & Scrape was the final Sebadoh album to feature songs composed by founding member Eric Gaffney.

== Music ==
Like its predecessor, Sebadoh III, Bubble & Scrape features songwriting contributions from all three members: co-founders Gaffney and Lou Barlow, and Jason Loewenstein. Unlike the first three official Sebadoh albums, however, Barlow's contributions are mostly electric, with one exception being the acoustic duet with Swirlies vocalist Seana Carmody, "Think (Let Tomorrow Bee)."

Bubble & Scrape was the first Sebadoh album to be recorded entirely in a professional studio, marking a departure from the lo-fi, home-recorded sound of their previous albums. In addition to the greater use of electric guitars and the higher production value, the album features longer songs and more sophisticated song arrangements, paving the way for their more polished future albums, starting with Bakesale in 1994.

== Reception ==
Professional ratings
Review scores
Source	Rating
AllMusic	4/5 stars
Drowned in Sound	8/10
Pitchfork	9.2/10
PopMatters	8/10
Rolling Stone	4/5 stars
Spin Alternative Record Guide	7/10

Critics praised the strength of Barlow compositions like "Soul and Fire" and "Think (Let Tomorrow Bee)," and also noted Loewenstein's emergence as a songwriter.

It was ranked #9 in the NME's "Top 30 Heartbreak Albums" list in 2000.

The album was especially well-reviewed upon its reissue in 2008, with Matthew Fiander of PopMatters writing, "It is an album that stands to benefit from a second life, and gives us as listeners the chance to hear a recording that we may remember but possibly overlooked the first time around." Amy Granzin of Pitchfork Media wrote that it "may be the band's holistic best [album]," and that it "marked the point at which Sebadoh's aesthetic evolved from 'quick, where's the four-track?' to reasonably well-crafted indie rock."

The album was also included in the book 1001 Albums You Must Hear Before You Die.

== Singles ==
"Soul and Fire" was released as a single in 1993, on CD and 12" vinyl in the UK by Domino, and on 7" vinyl, featuring different track listing, in the U.S. by Sub Pop.

== Reissue ==
Bubble & Scrape was reissued by Domino in May, 2008, featuring 15 extra tracks.

The album was performed live in its entirety as part of the All Tomorrow's Parties-curated Don't Look Back series, at Koko in London, in May, 2008, and at the Pitchfork Music Festival at Union Park in Chicago in July, 2008.

== Track listing ==
1. "Soul and Fire" (Barlow) – 3:46
2. "Two Years Two Days" (Barlow) – 3:07
3. "Telecosmic Alchemy" (Gaffney) – 2:15
4. "Fantastic Disaster" (Gaffney) – 3:33
5. "Happily Divided" (Loewenstein) – 2:20
6. "Sister" (Loewenstein) – 2:43
7. "Cliche" (Barlow) – 2:27
8. "Sacred Attention" (Barlow) – 2:47
9. "Elixir Is Zog" (Gaffney) – 2:06
10. "Emma Get Wild" (Gaffney) – 1:21
11. "Sixteen" (Loewenstein) – 1:29
12. "Homemade" (Barlow) – 5:02
13. "Forced Love" (Barlow) – 3:19
14. "No Way Out" (Gaffney) – 2:15
15. "Bouquet for a Siren" (Gaffney) – 2:56
16. "Think (Let Tomorrow Bee)" (Barlow) – 3:12
17. "Flood" (Loewenstein) – 1:34

=== Extra tracks (2008 reissue) ===
1. "Reject" (Barlow) – 2:23
2. "Sister" (Loewenstein) – 2:12
3. "Bouquet for a Siren" (Gaffney) – 2:07
4. "Emma Get Wild" (Gaffney) – 0:57
5. "Flood / Ken" (Loewenstein) – 2:07
6. "Messin' Around" (Gaffney) – 1:38
7. "Visibly Wasted II" (Gaffney) – 1:31
8. "You Are Going Down" (Loewenstein) – 0:56
9. "Old Daze" (Loewenstein) – 1:32
10. "Part 1 – Lou" (Barlow) – 4:28
11. "Part 2 – Eric" (Gaffney) – 2:09
12. "Part 3 – Eric" (Gaffney) – 1:45
13. "Part 4 – Jason" (Loewenstein) – 2:23
14. "Happily Divided" (Loewenstein) – 2:49
15. "Soul and Fire [acoustic demo]" (Barlow) – 2:13

== Personnel ==
- Lou Barlow – Vocals, Guitar, Bass
- Eric Gaffney – Vocals, Bass, Guitar, Drums, Harp, Keyboards, Tape
- Jason Loewenstein – Vocals, Guitar, Bass, Drums

Additional personnel

- Seana Carmody – Vocals
- James SK Wān - Vocals
- Bob Weston – Engineer
