= Empire of Dirt =

Empire of Dirt: The Aesthetics and Rituals of British Indie Music
- Paperback cover
- Author: Wendy Fonarow
- Language: English
- Genre: non-fiction
- Publisher: Wesleyan University Press
- Publication date: 2006
- Publication place: United States
- Media type: Print (hardback and paperback)
- Pages: 336
- ISBN: 978-0-8195-6810-6

Empire of Dirt: The Aesthetics and Rituals of British Indie Music is a 2006 book by Wendy Fonarow.

== Contents ==
The title of the book comes from one verse from the song "Hurt" by Nine Inch Nails ("and you could have it all, my empire of dirt"). While writing the manuscript, Fonarow was given a vinyl edition of the Johnny Cash album American IV, which includes a cover of "Hurt", by Alan McGee, founder of Creation Records.

The cover, designed by Matthew Cooper, depicts a typical indie band (two guitarists, a bass player and a drummer) in silhouette (see sleeperbloke).

In chapter 1 the author discuss 'What Is "Indie"?'. A problem with defining indie is that any precise definition will exclude music and performers which indie fans and insiders feel should be included or include ones that should be excluded. These are some possible definitions:

1. Indie music is the one which is recorded by independent labels and distributed via independent distributors. Records distributed via independent distributors qualified for the UK Indie Chart.
2. a genre of music with a distinctive sound and style.
3. music that communicates a particular ethos.
4. a category of critical assessment.
5. music different from other genres like mainstream pop, dance, blues, country or classical.

== Reviews ==
- Jonze, Tim (26 April 2008). "School of rock". The Guardian.
- Rose, Emily (9 June 2006). "Dirty indie: 'Professor of indie rock' Wendy Fonarow explains how 13 years of gig attendance spawned Empire of Dirt". Archived from the original on 8 July 2011.
- Grassy, Elsa (2007). "Empire of Dirt: The Aesthetics and Rituals of British Indie Music". Cercles, Revue pluridisciplinaire du monde anglophone [multidisciplinary review of the English-speaking world]. Archive: Book reviews (16). Universite de Rouen.
- Itzkoff, Dave (1 October 2006). "Music Chronicle". Sunday Book Review. The New York Times.
