= Secret (EP) =

Secret EP

EP by Sebadoh
- Released: July 23, 2012
- Recorded: March 29, 2012–July 13, 2012 at Indietopia in Glendale, California
- Genre: Indie rock
- Length: 16:44
- Producer: Jason Loewenstein

Sebadoh chronology
Wade Through the Boggs (2007)	Secret EP (2012)	Defend Yourself (2013)

Secret EP is an EP by the American indie rock band Sebadoh, released on July 23, 2012. The EP was not released on a label and was made available for digital download on the online music store Bandcamp. The EP was recorded from March to July 2012 at Indietopia in Glendale, California. Secret EP is Sebadoh's first new material in fourteen years since the band's previous album The Sebadoh (1999).

== Recording ==
Sebadoh began recording Secret EP on March 29, 2012 at frontman Lou Barlow's rehearsal space. Updates from the recording sessions were posted by band member Jason Loewenstein on his official Blogger. The basic tracks for eleven potential songs were completed by April 10. In May, the band began the second and final recording sessions and by June the band began mixing the EP and recording overdubs. On July 18, the band announced on its official Facebook page that mixing had been completed and the tracks were going to be mastered the following day. The recording sessions were produced and engineered by Lowenstein.

== Release ==
Secret EP was released on July 23, 2012. The EP was released as a digital download on the online music store Bandcamp in MP3 and FLAC formats. The band posted release notes with the download calling the EP "new songs for 2012, a taste of our upcoming 2013 album" but confirmed none of the songs would be featured on the album. The band also stated that proceeds from the EP's sales will "help us continue working on the LP and remain as independent as possible," adding that CD copies of the EP will be available for sale during the band's tour in support of Secret EP.

=== Tour ===
Sebadoh toured to support the release of Secret EP. The North American tour began in Philadelphia, Pennsylvania on August 7, 2012 and concluded in New York, New York on August 22.

Date	City	Country	Venue
North America
August 7, 2012	Philadelphia	United States	Union Transfer
August 8, 2012	Boston	United States	The Middle East Restaurant & Nightclub
August 9, 2012	Northampton	United States	Pearl Street
August 10, 2012	Washington	United States	Black Cat
August 11, 2012	Carrboro	United States	Cat's Cradle
August 12, 2012	Atlanta	United States	The Earl
August 14, 2012	Nashville	United States	The Mercy Lounge
August 15, 2012	St. Louis	United States	Off Broadway
August 16, 2012	Chicago	United States	Schubas Tavern
August 17, 2012	Cleveland	United States	Grog Shop
August 18, 2012	Hamilton	Canada	The Cashbah
August 20, 2012	Toronto	Canada	Horseshoe Tavern
August 21, 2012	Montreal	Canada	La Sala Rossa
August 22, 2012	New York	United States	Bowery Ballroom

== Track listing ==
No.	Title	Writer(s)	Length
1.	"Keep the Boy Alive"	Barlow	04:07
2.	"My Drugs"	Loewenstein	04:05
3.	"Arbitrary High"	Barlow	03:07
4.	"I Don't Mind"	Loewenstein	03:52
5.	"All Kinds"	Barlow	01:33
Total length:			16:44

== Personnel ==
All personnel credits adapted from the album's online release notes.

Sebadoh

- Lou Barlow – vocals, guitar, bass
- Jason Loewenstein – vocals, guitar, bass
- Bob D'Amico – drums, percussion

Technical personnel

- Jason Loewenstein – producer, engineer, mixing (1, 2, 4, 5)
- Andrew Murdock – mixing (3)
