= Ocean (Sebadoh song) =

Single by Sebadoh

from the album Harmacy
- Released: 1996
- Genre: Indie rock
- Length: 2:49
- Label: Sub Pop; Domino; City Slang
- Songwriter: Lou Barlow
- Producer: Tim O'Heir

Alternative cover
- Promo cover

"Ocean" is a song by Sebadoh from their 1996 album Harmacy. It was released as a Promo CD, a CD single and 7" vinyl record.

A music video was made for the song. It was directed by Laura Borealis (Laura Hyde Crapo).

== Track listings ==
UK 7" single (RUG50)

1. "Ocean (Tim O'Heir's Ocean Way remix)"
2. "Worst Thing (Osterville version)"

UK/GE CD single (RUG50CD)

1. "Ocean (Tim O'Heir's Ocean Way remix)"
2. "Worst Thing (Osterville version)"
3. "Third Generation Deadline"
4. "Portrait of the Dead Artist on the Phone"

US Promo single (SUBPROCD 53)

1. "Ocean (Tim O'Heir's Ocean Way remix)"

== Charts ==
Chart performance for "Ocean"
Chart (1996)	Peak position
US Alternative Airplay (Billboard)	23
