= Defend Yourself =

Studio album by Sebadoh
- Released: September 16, 2013
- Genre: Indie rock
- Length: 45:45
- Labels: Joyful Noise, Domino
- Producer: Sebadoh

Sebadoh chronology
Secret EP (2012)	Defend Yourself (2013)	Act Surprised (2019)

Professional ratings
Aggregate scores
Source	Rating
Metacritic	71/100
Review scores
Source	Rating
AllMusic	3/5 stars
Exclaim!	9/10
The Guardian	3/5 stars
Mojo	4/5 stars
NME	6/10
Paste	8.0/10
Pitchfork	6.0/10
PopMatters	8/10
Rolling Stone	3.5/5 stars
Spin	6/10

Defend Yourself is the eighth studio album by American indie rock band Sebadoh. It is the band's first album in fourteen years, since 1999's The Sebadoh.

The album was released on September 16, 2013 via Domino in the United Kingdom and on September 17, 2013 via Joyful Noise in the United States, respectively.

== Track listing ==
No.	Title	Writer(s)	Length
1.	"I Will"	Barlow	3:57
2.	"Love You Here"	Barlow	3:33
3.	"Beat"	Loewenstein	4:12
4.	"Defend yr Self"	Loewenstein	3:12
5.	"Oxygen"	Barlow	3:21
6.	"Once"	D'Amico	2:55
7.	"Inquiries"	Loewenstein	2:01
8.	"State of Mine"	Barlow	3:44
9.	"Final Days"	Loewenstein	4:22
10.	"Can't Depend"	Loewenstein	4:23
11.	"Let It Out"	Barlow	4:29
12.	"Listen"	Barlow	3:37
13.	"Separate"	Loewenstein	1:59
Total length:			45:45

Included with the limited edition tri-color vinyl and red color vinyl releases was a 7" single that had two tracks that were left off of the album. These tracks were also released on iTunes and included on the Japanese CD release along with the Secret EP track "All Kinds".

Bonus tracks
No.	Title	Writer(s)	Length
14.	"Imminent Emergency"	Barlow	2:34
15.	"No Wound"	Loewenstein	2:30

Japanese CD bonus track
No.	Title	Writer(s)	Length
16.	"All Kinds"	Barlow	1:33

== Personnel ==
Sebadoh

- Lou Barlow - vocals, guitar, bass
- Jason Loewenstein - vocals, bass, guitar
- Bob D'Amico - drums, percussion

Other personnel

- Lou Barlow - engineering
- Jason Loewenstein - mixing
- Pete Lyman - mastering
