= Asshole (EP) =

EP by Sebadoh
- Released: 1990
- Genre: Indie rock, lo-fi
- Label: Vertical Records

Professional ratings
Review scores
Source	Rating
Mark Prindle	8/10 stars

Asshole is a 7" single by Sebadoh, released in 1990. The single was limited to 1000 copies, with the first 500 pressings in hand colored sleeves, and the second 500 in plain black sleeves.

The songs were written by Lou Barlow about J. Mascis after being kicked out of Dinosaur Jr.

== Track listing ==
1. "Pig (Coward)"
2. "Hung Up"
3. "Slow to Learn"
4. "Julienne"
5. "Violent Elements"
6. "Attention"
7. "Your Long Journey" (Doc Watson cover)
