= Not Too Amused =

1994 single by Sebadoh

Single by Sebadoh

from the album Bakesale
- Released: 1995
- Genre: Indie rock
- Length: 4:16
- Label: Domino
- Songwriter(s): Jason Loewenstein
- Producer(s): Tim O'Heir

"Not Too Amused" is a song by Sebadoh from their 1994 album Bakesale. It was released as a CD Single and 7" vinyl record.

== Track listing ==
UK CD Single and 7" Single (RUG38)

1. "Not Too Amused"
2. "Hank Williams"
3. "Not Too Amused (Live)"
4. "Not Too Amused (Radio Edit)
