= Oven Is My Friend =

EP by Sebadoh
- Released: Winter 1991
- Label: Siltbreeze

Professional ratings
Review scores
Source	Rating
Mark Prindle	6/10 stars

Oven Is My Friend is a 7-inch EP by Sebadoh, released in 1991. It was limited to 1500 copies.

== Track listing ==
1. "Oven Is My Friend" (Church Police cover)
2. "Prove It"
3. "Cheapshot"
4. "Waxbag Maestro"
5. "Delicious Cakes"
