= The Freed Weed =

Compilation album by Sebadoh
- Released: 1990
- Genre: Lo-fi
- Length: 72:19
- Label: Homestead
- Producer: Lou Barlow

Sebadoh chronology
Weed Forestin' (1990)	The Freed Weed (1990)	Sebadoh III (1991)

Professional ratings
Review scores
Source	Rating
AllMusic	3/5 stars
Robert Christgau	D

The Freed Weed is a compilation album by the American indie rock band Sebadoh. It was released by Homestead Records in 1990.

It contains the band's second album, Weed Forestin' (1990), in full, followed by 16 of the 32 tracks from their first album, The Freed Man (1989), along with two previously unavailable songs: "Little Man" and "Submarine." The song "Mothra" from The Freed Man is re-titled "Stop the Wheel" on this release.

An expanded, remastered version of The Freed Man was released by Domino in 2006. The Freed Weed remains the only official release of Weed Forestin' on CD, though it was self-released on CD and several other formats as a Sentridoh album by Lou Barlow on Bandcamp in 2012.

== Track listing ==
1. "Temporary Dream"
2. "New Worship"
3. "Subtle Holy Gift
4. "My Own Religion"
5. "Ride the Darker Wave"
6. "More Simple"
7. "Jealous of Jesus"
8. "Mr. Genius Eyes"
9. "Perfect Power"
10. "Feeding Evil"
11. "Sexual Confusion"
12. "Three Times a Day"
13. "Gate to Hell"
14. "Broken"
15. "Whitey Peach"
16. "I Can't See/Take My Hand"
17. "Pound My Skinny Head"
18. "I Believe in Fate"
19. "Waited Forever"
20. "Slightest Suggestion"
21. "It's So Hard to Fall in Love"
22. "Brand New Love"
23. "Burning Out"
24. "Little Man"
25. "Punch in the Nose"
26. "Loose 'n Screw"
27. "Jealous Evil"
28. "Moldy Bread"
29. "Bridge Was You"
30. "Bolder"
31. "True Hardcore"
32. "Stop the Wheel"
33. "Made Real"
34. "Level Anything"
35. "Soul Mate"
36. "Nest"
37. "Narrow Stories"
38. "Submarine"
39. "Wall of Doubt"
40. "Crumbs"
