= Rocking the Forest =

1992 EP by Sebadoh

EP by Sebadoh
- Released: 1992
- Recorded: Fort Apache Studios, Cambridge, MA, Slaughterhouse Studios, Calgary, Alberta, Bob Westons house
- Genre: Indie rock, lo-fi
- Length: 23:37
- Label: Domino
- Producer: Bob Weston, Sean Slade, Paul Q. Kolderie

Professional ratings
Review scores
Source	Rating
Mark Prindle	9/10 stars

Rocking the Forest is an EP by Sebadoh, released in 1992. It was the first release on the label Domino Records, who released it in the United Kingdom via a licensing agreement with Sebadoh's American label Sub Pop.

Two songs (#1 & #2) had been previously released on the Gimme Indie Rock 7 inch EP. Three songs (#2, #3 & #5) are re-recordings of songs previously released under Lou Barlow's Sentridoh moniker. Four songs (#4, #6, #7 & #8) were later included on the compilation album Smash Your Head on the Punk Rock. The entire EP was included as bonus tracks on the German version of Sebadoh vs Helmet, released by City Slang on CD, LP and MC in 1992.

== Track listing ==
1. "Gimme Indie Rock" - 3:24
2. "Ride the Darker Wave" - 1:42
3. "It's So Hard to Fall in Love" - 2:01
4. "Cry Sis" - 2:52
5. "Really Insane II" - 1:52
6. "Vampire" - 2:41
7. "Junk Bonds" - 1:53
8. "Mind Meld" - 7:10
