= Soul and Fire =

Single by Sebadoh

from the album Bubble & Scrape
- Released: 1993
- Genre: Indie rock
- Length: 3:46
- Label: Sub Pop
- Songwriter(s): Lou Barlow
- Producer(s): Brian Fellows; Paul McNamara

Professional ratings
Review scores
Source	Rating
AllMusic	4/5 stars

"Soul and Fire" is a 1993 song by Sebadoh. It is the first song on their 1993 album Bubble & Scrape. It was released as a CD single, 7" vinyl record, and 12" vinyl single.

The song was inspired by Lou Barlow's breakup with his then girlfriend, Kathleen Billus. The song affected Billus so profoundly, that it brought the two back together. Portland Mercury considered the song "one of the most brutal and poignant portraits of a breakup ever conceived."

== Critical reception ==
The song has been widely praised. Many critics consider it among Barlow's best songs, and one of the best indie rock songs of its time. Pitchfork called it "preternaturally melodic, verging on sing-song...and stacked with plangent guitar clang, flag-waving choruses, and 16-wheeler loads of romantic baggage."

In a "Song of the Day" review, NPR wrote that it "conveys a knotty bundle of conflicting emotions." The A.V. Club called it 1993's best single.

== Track listing ==
US 7" Single (SP211)

1. "Soul and Fire"
2. "Reject"
3. "Sister"
4. "Bouquet for a Siren"

The versions of "Sister" and "Bouquet for a Siren" are different from those which appear on Bubble & Scrape.

UK CD and 12" Single (RUG4)

1. "Soul and Fire"
2. "Fantastic Disaster (Amateur mix)"
3. "Emma Get Wild"
4. "Reject" (Necros cover)
5. "Flood"
6. "Showtape '91"

The versions of "Emma Get Wild" and "Flood" are different from those which appear on Bubble & Scrape.
