= Act Surprised =

Studio album by Sebadoh
- Released: May 24, 2019
- Studio: Sonelab
- Genre: Indie rock
- Length: 42:47
- Label: Dangerbird / Fire
- Producer: Justin Pizzoferrato

Sebadoh chronology
Defend Yourself (2013)	Act Surprised (2019)

Professional ratings
Aggregate scores
Source	Rating
Metacritic	76/100
Review scores
Source	Rating
AllMusic	3.5/5 stars
Classic Rock	3.5/5 stars
Exclaim!	8/10
Mojo	4/5 stars
Pitchfork	7.5/10
PopMatters	7/10
Spectrum Culture	3.75/5 stars
Uncut	3/5 stars
Under the Radar	7/10

Act Surprised is the ninth studio album by American indie rock band Sebadoh. It is the band's first album in six years. The album was released on May 24, 2019.

The album has seven songs each by Lou Barlow and Jason Loewenstein and one by Bob D’Amico.

== Track listing ==
1. "Phantom" (Jason Loewenstein) – 2:23
2. "Celebrate the Void" (Lou Barlow) – 3:09
3. "Follow the Breath" (Loewenstein) – 2:13
4. "Medicate" (Barlow) – 3:34
5. "See-Saw" (Barlow) – 3:37
6. "Vacation" (Loewenstein) – 2:06
7. "Stunned" (Loewenstein) – 2:25
8. "Fool" (Barlow) – 2:34
9. "Raging River" (Loewenstein) – 3:11
10. "Sunshine" (Barlow) – 3:30
11. "Act Surprised" (Loewenstein) – 3:11
12. "Battery" (Loewenstein) – 3:12
13. "Belief" (Barlow) – 2:55
14. "Leap Year" (Bob D'Amico) – 3:15
15. "Reykjavik" (Barlow) – 3:32

== Personnel ==
Sebadoh

- Lou Barlow – vocals, guitar, bass
- Jason Loewenstein – vocals, bass, guitar
- Bob D'Amico – drums, percussion
