= Beauty of the Ride =

Single by Sebadoh

from the album Harmacy
- Released: 1996
- Genre: Indie rock
- Length: 2:48
- Label: Domino; City Slang
- Songwriter: Lou Barlow
- Producer: Tim O'Heir

"Beauty of the Ride"
Beauty of the Ride audio sample

"Beauty of the Ride" is a song by Sebadoh from their 1996 album Harmacy. It was released as a CD single, a 7" vinyl record, and a 10" vinyl record.

The song peaked at number 74 on the UK Singles chart.

== Track listing ==
UK/GE 7" single (RUG47)

1. "Beauty of the Ride (Combination mix)"
2. "Riding" (Palace Brothers cover)

UK/GE 10" and CD single (RUG47CD)

1. "Beauty of the Ride (Combination mix)"
2. "Sixteen"
3. "Riding" (Palace Brothers cover)
4. "Slintstrumental"

== Charts ==
Chart (1996)	Peak position
UK Singles (OCC)	74
