= Bob D'Amico =

American drummer

- Born: October 8, 1969 (age 55)
- Origin: Queens, NY
- Genres: Indie rock
- Occupation: Musician
- Instrument: Drums
- Years active: Late 80s–present

Bob D'Amico is an American drummer. He is best known as the drummer for indie rock bands The Fiery Furnaces and Sebadoh.

== Discography ==
=== With Set On Stun ===
Studio albums

- Reveals the Shocking Truth... CD (1998, Distance Formula Recordings)

=== With The Fiery Furnaces ===
Studio albums

- Widow City CD/2xLP/Digital (October 9, 2007, Thrill Jockey)
- I'm Going Away CD/LP/Digital (July 21, 2009, Thrill Jockey)

Live albums

- Remember 2xCD/3xLP/Digital (August 19, 2008, Thrill Jockey)

Singles

- The End is Near LP (July 24, 2009, Thrill Jockey)

=== With Lou Reed ===
- "Peggy Sue" Rave On Buddy Holly CD/LP (June 28, 2011, Fantasy Records/Concord Music Group)

=== With Sebadoh ===
Studio albums

- Defend Yourself CD/LP/Cassette/Digital (September 16, 2013, Joyful Noise/Domino)
- Act Surprised CD/LP/Digital (May 24, 2019, Dangerbird Records/Fire Records)

EPs

- Secret EP CD/LP/Digital (July 23, 2012, Self-released/Joyful Noise)

=== With Saqqara Mastabas ===
Studio albums

- Libras CD/LP (June 3, 2016, Joyful Noise)
