= Gimme Indie Rock! =

EP by Sebadoh
- Released: 1991
- Recorded: Fort Apache Studios and at home.
- Length: 12:24
- Label: Homestead Records

Professional ratings
Review scores
Source	Rating
Allmusic	4.5/5 stars

Gimme Indie Rock! is a 7-inch EP by Sebadoh, released in 1991. The first pressing was released on clear vinyl and black vinyl, and was later reissued on translucent green vinyl and on marbled gray vinyl. The EP was included in its entirety on the reissued version of Sebadoh III.

== Track listing ==
1. "Gimme Indie Rock" - 3:23
2. "Ride The Darker Wave" - 1:42
3. "Red Riding Good" - 1:53
4. "New King" - 2:27
5. "Calling Yog Soggoth" - 2:59
