= Wade Through the Boggs =

Compilation album by Sebadoh
- Released: February 26, 2007
- Genre: Indie rock
- Length: 47:56
- Producer: various

Sebadoh chronology
The Sebadoh (1999)	Wade Through the Boggs (2007)	Secret EP (2012)

Wade Through the Boggs is a compilation released by Sebadoh in 2007 and sold during its tour that year. It was limited to 1000 copies.

The tracks are live recordings, radio performances, alternate versions and unreleased songs.

The title refers to former Boston Red Sox player Wade Boggs.

== Track listing ==
1. "Happily Divided" (Loewenstein) [2:21] Radio, Holland, May 1993
2. "Healthy Sick" (Barlow) [1:22] Radio, Holland, May 1993, Eric-Piano, Lou-Percussion
3. "Messin' Around" (Gaffney) [1:35] Recorded May 1992
4. "Cheapshot" (Barlow) [1:29] Live at ? year ?
5. "Let the Day Have Its Way" (Loewenstein) [2:18]
6. "Mean Distance" (Gaffney) [2:56] Oak Street Garage 1990
7. "Spoiled" (Barlow) [3:03] 1991
8. "Not My Friend" (Loewenstein) [1:31] Recorded 1989
9. "MEE-YOW" (Barlow) [1:14]
10. "Smaller Yard" (Barlow) [2:19]
11. "All That I Could" (Barlow) [1:39]
12. "Broken Love" (Barlow) [3:29]
13. "Cry Sis" (Gaffney) [2:34] Recorded 1990–1992
14. "Limb By Limb" (Gaffney) [2:09] Recorded 1990, with Lou-Bass/Vocals
15. "Indeed You Are" (Loewenstein) [2:27]
16. "Wake and Bake" (Gaffney) [2:14] Recorded 1992, Eric Gaffney-Drums, Left Guitar, Jason Loewenstein-Bass, guitar
17. "Visibly Wasted (reprise)" (Gaffney) [1:33] Recorded Don't Come on Monday, Berlin, November 1992
18. "Wade Through the Boggs" [5:27] Recorded 1992, Eric Gaffney-Drums, Left Guitar, Jason Loewenstein-Bass, guitar
19. "Katina's Live 1990" (Barlow/Gaffney/Loewenstein) Hadley, MA., January 1990
20. "Chicken Walk" (traditional) [2:25] Lou-Bass/Vocal, Eric-Guitar, Jason-Drums
21. "Sebadough!" (Barlow) [0.59]
