= Rebound (Sebadoh song) =

Single by Sebadoh

from the album Bakesale
- Released: February 14, 1995
- Genre: Indie rock
- Length: 2:16
- Label: Sub Pop; Domino
- Songwriter: Lou Barlow
- Producer: Tim O'Heir

"Rebound" is a song by American indie rock band Sebadoh, from their 1994 album Bakesale. It was released as a CD single and 7" vinyl record.

A solo acoustic version appears as a B-side on the song's US single and on the 2011 Bakesale reissue.

A music video was made for the song.

== Track listing ==
US CD single (SP284b)

1. "Rebound"
2. "Social Medicine"
3. "On Fire (acoustic)"
4. "Magnet's Coil (acoustic)"
5. "Rebound (acoustic)"

UK 7" single (RUG17)

1. "Rebound"
2. "Careful"
