= The Freed Man =

Studio album by Sebadoh
- Released: September 1989
- Recorded: 1988
- Genre: Lo-fi; indie rock
- Length: 48:55 (original release); 78:43 (2007 reissue)
- Label: Homestead (original release); Domino (2007 reissue)

Sebadoh chronology
The Freed Man (1989)	Weed Forestin' (1990)

Professional ratings
Review scores
Source	Rating
AllMusic	3.5/5 stars
Drowned in Sound	7/10
Pitchfork	8.6/10
Stylus Magazine	A−

The Freed Man is the debut album by Sebadoh (Lou Barlow and Eric Gaffney). The title refers to the Friedman Complex apartments at Smith College where Lou Barlow was living with his then-girlfriend Kathleen Billus. As Barlow says in the liner notes, "... we named our first co-headlining tape after the Friedman dormitory where we both were living against regulations, with our girlfriends on the Smith (all women's) College campus .."

Domino re-released this album in 2007. The re-release contains 52 tracks instead of the original 32.

== Track listing ==
1. "Bridge Was You"
2. "Soulmate"
3. "I Love Me"
4. "Nest"
5. "Careless Mind Hands"
6. "True Hardcore"
7. "Close Enough"
8. "Loosened Screw"
9. "Solid Brown"
10. "Made Real"
11. "Crumbs"
12. "Narrow Stories"
13. "Drifts on Through"
14. "Wall of Doubt"
15. "Lou Rap"
16. "Growin' Up with You"
17. "Healthy Sick"
18. "Land of the Lords"
19. "Ladybugs"
20. "Moldy Bread"
21. "Squirrel Freedom Overdrive"
22. "Burning Out"
23. "Bolder"
24. "Why Do You Cut Off Your Sleeves"
25. "Wrists"
26. "Last Day of School"
27. "Punch in the Nose"
28. "Deny"
29. "Level Anything"
30. "Jealous Evil"
31. "K-sensa My I"
32. "Mothra"

== Reissue ==
1. "Healthy Sick"
2. "Level Anything"
3. "Soulmate"
4. "Ladybugs"
5. "Close Enough"
6. "True Hardcore"
7. "Julienne"
8. "Wrists"
9. "Amherst Hanging House"
10. "McKinley's Lament"
11. "Solid Brown"
12. "Narrow Stories"
13. "Bridge Was You"
14. "Drifts on Thru"
15. "Overturns"
16. "Yellow Submarine" (The Beatles cover)
17. "Squirrel Freedom Overdrive"
18. "Little Man"
19. "Land of the Lords"
20. "Bolder"
21. "Believe"
22. "Deny"
23. "Wall of Doubt"
24. "Crumbs"
25. "I Love Me"
26. "K-Sensa-My"
27. "Lou Rap"
28. "Punch in the Nose"
29. "Resistance to Flo"
30. "Stop the Wheel" (a.k.a. "Mothra")
31. "Loose n Screw"
32. "Oak Street Raga"
33. "Last Day of School"
34. "Jealous Evil"
35. "Moldy Bread"
36. "Made Real"
37. "Cindy"
38. "Nest"
39. "My Decision"
40. "Fire of July"
41. "Jaundice"
42. "Design"
43. "Dance"
44. "Cyster"
45. "Powerbroker"
46. "The Lorax"
47. "Pig"
48. "Hung Up"
49. "Slow to Learn"
50. "Elements"
51. "Attention" (live)
52. "Your Long Journey" (Doc Watson cover)
