= Big Stick (band) =

American alternative rock band

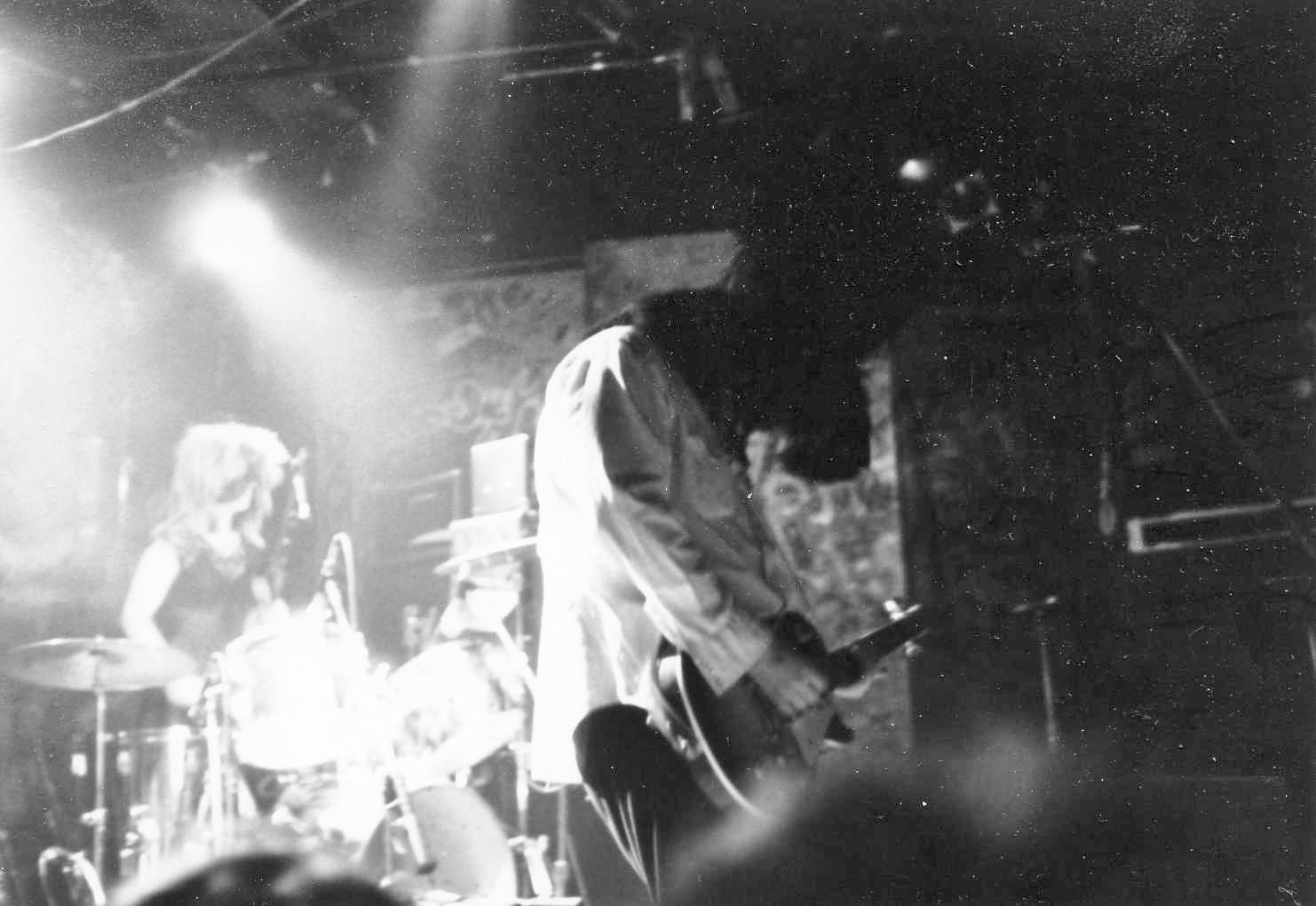
- Big Stick

Background information
- Origin: New York City, United States
- Genres: Alternative, art rock, punk rock, industrial, pop rock
- Years active: 1986–present
- Labels: Blast First, Drag Racing Underground
- Members: John Gill and Yanna Trance
- Website: http://www.big-stick.org/

Big Stick is an American musical duo formed in New York in 1985 by John Gill (guitar, vocals) and Yanna Trance (vocals, percussion, keyboards). Known mostly for their unconventional approach to songwriting and recording, Big Stick's music varies and jumps through different genres and categories, touching on punk rock, industrial music, and art rock and brutally simple performance style.

== History ==
Big Stick achieved domestic and foreign cult status with their rock-punk-pop debut release, the Drag Racing EP in 1986. It was instantly recognizable for Yanna Trance's catchy voice repeatedly speaking the line "In the summer I wear my tube top, and Eddie takes me to the dragstrip" throughout the track. It was one of the 142 singles in BBC DJ John Peel's Record Box that he'd picked to leave behind in case of a fire. "Drag Racing" was later featured in the "John Peel's Record Box" BBC TV production and aired in conjunction with the UK Rock 'N' Roll Hall of Fame awards. Artist extraordinaire Robert Williams also picked "Drag Racing" for his "Chrome, Smoke & Fire" Hot Rod Music Picture Disc Compilation.

In 1990, Blast First records released a box set of 10 7" singles by various artists on their roster, including Sonic Youth, Dinosaur Jr., Big Black, the Butthole Surfers and Sun Ra. The box set was named after the Big Stick track it contained, Devil's Jukebox. Many of "The Devil's Jukebox" tracks were also included on the Blast First compilation album "Nothing Short of Total War". A real "Devil's Jukebox," complete with horns, tail, and added devilish accessories were fabricated and stocked with the records of the box set. It was subsequently used as a prize in a contest/campaign held by a UK music publication.

While the band stayed together and circa 2008 performed with My Life with the Thrill Kill Kult, it is still for Drag Racing that they are best known. They have also collaborated on a film soundtrack, for Besotted.

In 2019 Big Stick entered into an exclusive agreement with Forte Music Distribution of the United Kingdom to establish Drag Racing Underground Records. 2019 releases as a result of this relationship included a reissue and remastering of the original "DRAG RACING" 7" for April's International Record Store Day (featuring a repro sleeve) and a "Much of the Best of Big Stick" vinyl album featuring a long-playing collection of popular Big Stick selections released in May 2019. Then the long-awaited multiple years in the making, 'all-new' Big Stick album simply titled "LP" came out in June/July 2019. "LP" featured 15 'new' songs and guest appearances from some of the duo's musician friends, including Fred Schneider of The B-52's, Groovie Mann of My Life with the Thrill Kill Kult, Jerry A of Poison Idea and Johnny Kelly of Type O Negative/Danzig (band) among others (see discography for a full list of guest musicians appearing on the album). "LP" was released on vinyl and CD formats and both formats include a bonus "Some of the Best of Big Stick" CD EP.

== Discography ==
- Drag Racing (Blast First/Rough Trade 12″ E.P. 1986)
- Live in London (Recess cassette 1986)
- “Jesus Was Born on an Indian Reservation” (Target You compilation cassette on Wally and the Beaver 1986)
- “Drag Racing”/”Hell on Earth” (Recess Records 7″ 1986)
- “Drag Racing”/”Hell on Earth”/”I Look Like Shit” (Recess Records 7″ 1986)
- Crack Attack (Buy Our Records 12″ E.P. 1987)
- “Crack Attack” (EMI 12″ single 1988)
- Crack N’ Drag (Blast First/Mute 12″ L.P. 1988)
- “Joe Turner Blues” and “Black Cow” (Big Stick/Sebadoh split EP, Sonic Life magazine, March 1989)
- “Devil's Jukebox” (Nothing Short of Total War compilation L.P. featuring Sonic Youth, Butthole Surfers, Dinosaur Jr. Blast First/Mute 1989)
- “Drag Racing” and “Devil's Jukebox” (Devil's Jukebox box set of 7″ records by Blast First bands Blast First/Mute 1990)
- Drag Racing Underground featuring “Broadcast Booth” and “Hellfire” (Snakeskin UK 7″ 1990)
- Drag Racing (Chrome Smoke & Fire Robert Williams double L.P. picture disc compilation Blast First/Mute 1991)
- “Hellfire”/”Broadcast Booth” (Snakeskin 7″ 1992) (as "Drag Racing Underground" for legal reasons)
- Hoochie Koo Time (Blast First/Mute 10″ E.P. 1992)
- Hedonist Chariot (Albertine LP 1993) (as "Drag Racing Underground" for legal reasons)
- “Freddie and Me” (Manhattan on the Rocks compilation LP Pow Wow 1994)
- “Summerday” (Pow Wow CD single 1996)
- “Panther” (Pow Wow CD single 1996)
- Pro Drag (Pow Wow L.P. 1996)
- Hot From The Strip (Recess Records 2004)
- "Much of the Best of Big Stick" (Drag Racing Underground Records 2019) compilation of fifteen of the duo's standout tracks. Available on record vinyl only.
- "LP" (Drag Racing Underground Records 2019) The duo's first album in some fifteen years featuring all-new material. Available on vinyl and 8 panel CD packages. Guest artists on "LP" include Fred Schneider, Groovie Mann, Jerry A, Johnny Kelly, Paula Henderson, Dave Smoota Smith, Tom Timko, Shawn Banks, Alicia Rau, Jim Sorensen, and others. Also includes both the vinyl & CD packages a bonus "Some of the Best of Big Stick" CD ep that features 10 classic standout tracks.
