= The Sebadoh =

Studio album by Sebadoh
- Released: February 23, 1999
- Recorded: 1998
- Studio: Mad Hatter Studios (Los Angeles)
- Genre: Alternative rock
- Length: 48:33
- Label: (United States) Sire (CD); Sub Pop (LP) (United Kingdom) Domino (Germany) City Slang (New Zealand) Flying Nun
- Producer: Eric Masunaga

Sebadoh chronology
Harmacy (1996)	The Sebadoh (1999)	Wade Through the Boggs (2007)

The Sebadoh is the seventh studio album by the indie rock band Sebadoh. It was released in 1999 on Sire Records. The album is the group's first and only major label release to date. Despite not becoming their third consecutive Top 40 album in the UK, it however spawned their only Top 40 single in that territory when “Flame” charted at No.30 in January 1999. Due to this relative success, it gave the band their only appearance on the major BBC television show Top of the Pops.

The Sebadoh is the only Sebadoh album with drummer Russell Pollard.

== Critical reception ==
Professional ratings
Review scores
Source	Rating
AllMusic	2.5/5 stars
NME	8/10
Pitchfork	7.4/10
Spin	5/10
Tom Hull – on the Web	B+
The Village Voice	A−

Rolling Stone wrote: "What keeps The Sebadoh from flying apart is the no-frills production, which puts a premium on the three-way conversation among bass, guitar and Russ Pollard's drums."

== Track listing ==
1. "It's All You" (Loewenstein) - 2:42
2. "Weird" (Barlow) - 3:26
3. "Bird in the Hand" (Loewenstein) - 1:36
4. "Break Free" (Pollard) - 2:39
5. "Tree" (Barlow) - 4:17
6. "Nick of Time" (Loewenstein) - 2:52
7. "Flame" (Barlow) - 4:56
8. "So Long" (Loewenstein) - 1:57
9. "Love Is Stronger" (Barlow) - 4:45
10. "Decide" (Loewenstein) - 3:42
11. "Colorblind" (Barlow) - 2:51
12. "Thrive" (Barlow) - 4:12
13. "Cuban" (Loewenstein) - 2:40
14. "Sorry" (Barlow) - 3:03
15. "Drag Down" (Loewenstein) - 2:50

== Personnel ==
Sebadoh

- Lou Barlow
- Jason Loewenstein
- Russell Pollard

Other personnel

- Michael Herren - vocals on "Tree"
- Eric Masunaga - production, mixing, recording
- Jason Loewenstein - recording
- Rich Costey - additional mixing on "Flame"
- Jeff Lipton - mastering

== Charts ==
Chart (1999)	Peak position
Norway	34
UK Albums Chart	45
US Heatseekers	15
US Billboard 200	197

=== Singles ===
Year	Song	Chart	Position
1999	Flame	UK Singles Chart	30
1999	It's All You	UK Singles Chart	88
