= Sebadoh III =

III

Studio album by Sebadoh
- Released: August 16, 1991
- Recorded: Late March 1991 at Fort Apache Studios and at home.
- Genre: Indie rock; lo-fi; acoustic rock; folk rock
- Length: 63:37
- Label: Homestead (original release); Domino (2006 reissue)
- Producer: Sean Slade

Sebadoh chronology
The Freed Weed (1990)	III (1991)	Smash Your Head on the Punk Rock (1992)

2006 Reissue album cover
- III was reissued with the Gimme Indie Rock EP included as a bonus disc in 2006

III (or Sebadoh III) is the third album by the American indie rock band Sebadoh. It was released by Homestead Records in 1991.

III was the first full length Sebadoh album to feature Jason Loewenstein, who joined the band's two founding members Lou Barlow and Eric Gaffney in 1989, and debuted on the "Gimme Indie Rock" single earlier that year.

The album cover features a childhood photograph taken by Gaffney.

== Recording ==
The album was recorded for US$1,300. It was recorded at Fort Apache Studios, then located in the Roxbury neighborhood of Boston, Massachusetts, and at home, during the last two weeks of March 1991.

== Music ==
III features songwriting contributions from all three band members, with folky, melodic material by Barlow, open-tuned drone acoustic, and noisy hardcore rock by Gaffney, and songs that bridged the gap between those extremes by Loewenstein. It opens with the electric "The Freed Pig," an attack by Barlow on his ex-bandmate J. Mascis, who kicked him out from his former band Dinosaur Jr. in 1989.

In an interview with Chairs Missing Fanzine in April 1991, Barlow explained that the album contained "Every type [of music] that we're capable of playing but not like, 'Well, here's our funk song and here's our folk song.' It's just every facet of our power is exercised to its fullest on the record ... There's a lot of electric stuff - a lot of 4-track stuff. It's a really balanced LP. This one is truly a group effort."

== Reception ==
Professional ratings
Review scores
Source	Rating
AllMusic	4.5/5 stars
The A.V. Club	A−
Drowned in Sound	9/10
The Independent	4/5 stars
Mojo	4/5 stars
Pitchfork	9.3/10
Rolling Stone	3.5/5 stars
The Rolling Stone Album Guide	4.5/5 stars
The Skinny	4/5 stars
Spin Alternative Record Guide	9/10

Along with Pavement's 1992 debut Slanted and Enchanted, III is considered one of the "cornerstones of 90s indie rock," and helped establish the lo-fi subgenre. The album has been included in various best-of lists in the years since its release, including Alternative Press' "Top 99 of '85–'99" in 1995 (#85) and Spin's "Top 90 Albums of the 90's" in 1999 (#41).

AllMusic critic Stephen Thomas Erlewine praised the "sensitivity" and "strong melodies" of Barlow's acoustic material, and called the album "a kaleidoscopic summation of various American underground rock genres of the '80s, as well as a launching pad for the introspective obsessions of '90s indie rock." Upon its reissue in 2006, Brandon Stosuy of Pitchfork wrote that "even after taking a step back from III it still deserves every last bit of praise. Sebadoh followed this effort with other fine moments; nowhere else did they so perfectly meld rickety folk, tin-can guitar, Shrimper-style ambiance, feedbacking "power sludge," eccentric compositional constructions, carcinogenic hooks, and poetic sincerity."

"The Freed Pig" was covered by the American indie rock band The Breeders on the Head to Toe EP in 1994.

"Spoiled" was re-released on the Kids soundtrack in 1995, and can be heard during the film's closing credits.

== Reissue ==
III was reissued by Domino Records in 2006, featuring a second disc of extra material and new liner notes. The bonus disc includes the "Gimme Indie Rock" EP in its entirety.

== Track listing ==
All songs written by Lou Barlow unless otherwise stated.

1. "The Freed Pig" – 3:08
2. "Sickles and Hammers" (Boon, Watt) – 0:50
3. "Total Peace" – 3:02
4. "Violet Execution" – 3:57 (Eric Gaffney)
5. "Scars, Four Eyes" – 3:27 (Gaffney/Barlow)
6. "Truly Great Thing" – 2:13
7. "Kath" – 1:52
8. "Perverted World" – 1:54
9. "Wonderful, Wonderful" (Edwards, Raleigh) – 3:13
10. "Limb by Limb" – 2:17 (Gaffney)
11. "Smoke a Bowl" – 3:02 (Loewenstein)
12. "Black-Haired Gurl" – 2:12 (Loewenstein)
13. "Hoppin' Up and Down" – 3:16 (Loewenstein)
14. "Supernatural Force" – 2:43 (Gaffney)
15. "Rockstar" – 2:42
16. "Downmind" – 1:31
17. "Renaissance Man" – 2:19
18. "God Told Me" – 1:09
19. "Holy Picture" – 2:53 (Gaffney)
20. "Hassle" – 3:30
21. "No Different" – 2:20
22. "Spoiled" – 3:03
23. "As the World Dies, the Eyes of God Grow Bigger" – 6:49 (Gaffney)

=== Extra disc - "Gimme Indie Rock EP" (2006 reissue) ===
All songs written by Eric Gaffney unless otherwise stated.

1. "Gimme Indie Rock" (Barlow/Gaffney/Loewenstein)
2. "Ride the Darker Wave" (Barlow)
3. "Red Riding Good" (Barlow)
4. "New King" (Loewenstein)
5. "Calling Yog Soggoth"
6. "Stored Up Wonder (Supernatural Force)"
7. "Melting Wall (Holy Picture)"
8. "Design"
9. "Attention"
10. "Stars for Eyes" (Gaffney/Barlow)
11. "Unseen Waste"
12. "Violet Execution (Remix '04)"
13. "As the World Turns"
14. "Cranberry Bog" (Loewenstein/Gaffney)
15. "The Devil's Reggae"
16. "The Freed Pig (4-track)" (Barlow)
17. "Never Jealous" (Barlow)
18. "Showtape '91" (Barlow)

== Personnel ==
- Lou Barlow – vocals, guitar, bass, percussion
- Eric Gaffney – vocals, guitar, drums
- Jason Loewenstein – vocals, drums, guitar, bass

Additional personnel

- Sean Slade – Mellotron
