= Jason Loewenstein =

American singer-songwriter

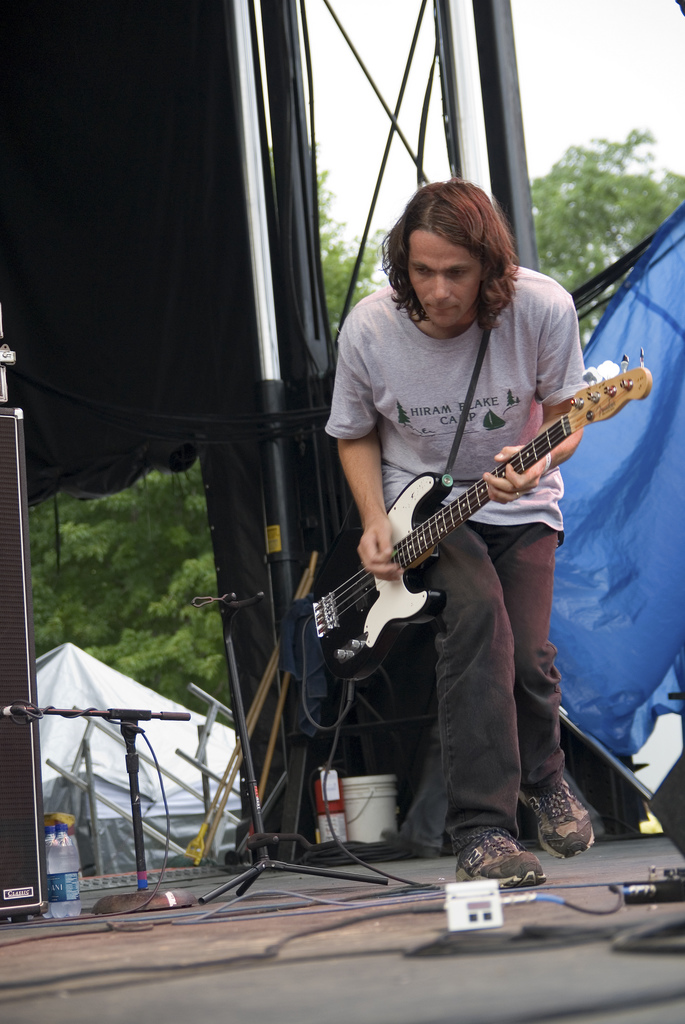
- with Sebadoh, 2008

Background information
- Born: Jason Loewenstein; July 20, 1971 (age 55)
- Origin: Boston, Massachusetts
- Genres: Indie rock, lo-fi
- Occupations: Singer/songwriter guitarist
- Instruments: Vocals; Guitar; Bass; Drums; Banjo
- Years active: 1989–present
- Labels: Sub Pop, Vertical Records, Joyful Noise Recordings
- Website: Official website

Jason Loewenstein (born July 20, 1971) is an American alternative rock singer, songwriter, multi-instrumentalist, producer, and a member of the indie-rock bands Sebadoh, The Fiery Furnaces, and Circle of Buzzards. He grew up in Northampton, Massachusetts, where he attended Northampton High School, and now resides in Brooklyn, New York.

== Sebadoh ==
In 1989, Loewenstein was recruited by Eric Gaffney to play drums and bass for Sebadoh. His first songwriting contributions came on Sebadoh III and continued on Bubble & Scrape, adding "dark .. rough hewn pop gems" like "Happily Divided" and "Sister".

Following Gaffney's departure from Sebadoh in 1993, Loewenstein assumed a higher songwriting profile, contributing five songs to 1994's Bakesale.

This continued on the last two Sebadoh releases of the 1990s, Harmacy and The Sebadoh, after which the group went on hiatus until 2003/2004 when he and Lou Barlow toured as a duo on a tour they called "Turbo Acoustic", with Loewenstein and Barlow playing along to drum tracks that were pre-recorded by Loewenstein.

In 2007, he, Barlow and Gaffney reformed the "Sebadoh Classic" trio and toured throughout the United States and Europe.

== Solo work ==
Loewenstein's first official solo work came under the name of Sparkalepsy with the Heather's Overbite EP, released in 1994.

In 2002, he produced and played every instrument on his first solo album At Sixes and Sevens, which was released on Sub Pop. The touring band for that record included Kevin Mazzarelli and Bob D'Amico, who would later join Jason in playing with the Fiery Furnaces in addition to forming Circle of Buzzards with him in 2008, as well as eventually joining Sebadoh when they reformed in 2011. In late 2016 it was announced that Jason would be releasing a new solo record on Joyful Noise Recordings titled Spooky Action. A single for the song Machinery was released before the release date of June 16, 2017 was announced. The album was promoted partly through a unique tour of small DIY house shows throughout the South and the Midwest booked by Jonathan Lee Horne from Joyful Noise Records. In a Subaru Outback, with a backing band featuring Bob D'Amico and Matthew Friedberger, they performed in living rooms, basements and illegal venues. The uniqueness of this tour was in the fact that all tickets were online, all the venues were non commercial (private houses, basements, etc.) and voluntarily given by the hosts. The idea for doing the early shows came from drummer Bob D'Amico who has convinced Sebadoh to do the same.

== Fiery Furnaces ==
From August 2005 to the present, Jason has performed and recorded with the Brooklyn-based band The Fiery Furnaces, playing bass and guitar. He acted as engineer on their 2008 release Remember and 2009's I'm Going Away.

== Other work ==
He has also played drums on several albums including Will Oldham's album Viva Last Blues, David Kilgour's (The Clean) "Frozen Orange", Brett Eugene Ralph's "Kentucky Chrome Review", and Lou Barlow's "EMOH".

== Discography ==
=== Albums ===
Year	Title	Label
2002	At Sixes And Sevens	Sub Pop / Domino
2017	Spooky Action	Joyful Noise Recordings

=== Singles and EPs ===
Year	Title	Label
1994	Heather's Overbite	Vertical Records
1994	Split With Unconvinced	Soul Static Sound
2002	Codes	Domino

=== Compilations ===
Year	Title	Label	Track(s)
1994	Our Band Could Be Your Life	Little Brother	King Of The Hill
1997	Broken Keys	Wormco	Vixen
1997	Japanese Rumba	Yak'uz'a	Take Down
2002	The Cornerstone Player 035	Cornerstone Promotion	Codes
2003	Destiny (The Hi-Lo Tunez Plan: 2nd Step)	Hi-Lo Tunez	Casserole
2003	Worlds Of Possibility	Domino	Codes
2004	Louisville Is For Lovers Vol.4	Double Malt Music	Just Lazy
