= Eric Gaffney =

American drummer (born 1967)

- Born: Eric Gaffney; December 25, 1967 (age 58); Cambridge, Massachusetts, U.S.
- Genres: Alternative rock, indie rock, lo-fi, hardcore punk
- Occupations: Musician, songwriter
- Instruments: Drums, guitar, vocals, percussion, bass, keyboards
- Labels: Sub Pop, Domino, Homestead

Eric Gaffney (born December 25, 1967, in Cambridge, Massachusetts) is an American songwriter, recording artist and most notably, the former drummer for Sebadoh, who has home recorded on cassette since 1981. An active participant in the Western Mass hardcore scene, in 1983 he founded, wrote songs for, and drummed with Grey Matter, opening hall shows with Jerry's Kids, F.U.s, The Freeze, Big Boys, Raw Power, Adrenalin O.D., Siege, 7 Seconds, Outpatients, Pajama Slave Dancers, Da Stupids, and others.

== Career ==
In 1984, he joined No Preservatives as lead singer. He was also editor of 'Withdrawal Fanzine,’ and contributed scene reports for Maximum Rock 'N' Roll. In 1986, he co-founded 'Gracefully Aging Hippy Soloists' with Charlie Ondras.

In 1988, he did the artwork, tape duplication, and local distribution for the first Sebadoh release: 'The Freed Man' cassette. The tape was favorably reviewed by Gerard Cosloy and resulted in a 3-record deal with Homestead Records.

In 1989, a split-single with Big Stick, was released in the UK, followed by 'Magic Ribbons Box Set', a split with King Missile.

Gaffney co-founded and arranged for the first practice of Sebadoh, and booked the first few shows for the band. He created the cover art for Sebadoh III, as well as the album collage art.

Sebadoh signed to both Sub Pop, 20/20 (Domino) and City Slang in 1992. Gaffney contributed the title and collage art and CD layout for Smash Your Head on the Punk Rock, the front cover photograph for Rockin' The Forest, and contributed the title of the Sebadoh Vs. Helmet album. Gaffney left the band in late 1993.

After leaving Sebadoh, Gaffney booked solo shows in New York and released 'It Lights Up & Spins Around' on cassette in 1998, performing and recording with his own project Fields of Gaffney, opening shows with Royal Trux, Danielson and Buffalo Tom. He released ‘Brilliant Concert Numbers’ on CD in 1999, and Sub Pop released a single-club 7” on blue vinyl. Gaffney relocated to San Francisco, and recreated the band with new members.

In 2006, 'Uncharted Waters' was released on Old Gold (Atlanta) and Handmade Records (Oslo). Gaffney performed at Noise Pop Festival in San Francisco in 2002, 2003, and 2007, and at CMJ in 1990, 1998, 2006.

In 2007, Sebadoh reformed with the original line-up as "Classic Sebadoh," with a full U.S. Tour. Domino reissue of Sebadoh III, and The Freed Man. Bubble & Scrape was reissued on Domino/Sub Pop, Sebadoh toured Europe in 2008 and co-headlined Pitchfork Festival 2008 with Public Enemy and Mission of Burma.

Joyful Noise released a limited edition "Cassetterospective" box set of ten cassette records in 2015.

Gaffney currently sells music via his Bandcamp page, and has twenty records digitally distributed worldwide.

== Discography ==
=== Albums ===
- Toxic Friends (as member of Toxic Friends) 2019
- Ghost of Christmas Future (animal friends/academia tapes)
- Land of Make Believe (Almost Halloween Time, Italy) 2016
- "Cassetterospective" (limited edition of 100 cassette box set) Joyful Noise, 2015
- Gracefully Aging Hippy Soloists (1986–1987) Academia, 2014
- Jesus Christ/Alasdair Roberts split-single (Happy Soul Records) 2013
- America's Drug (Animal Friends) 2011
- Down By The Bay 2011
- The World Turned Upside Down 2010
- Big Rock Candy Mountain 2010
- Sailor On The Rainpool Seas (Animal Friends) 2009
- Uncharted Waters (Old Gold/Handmade Records) 2006
- Fields of Gaffney 'Cosmic Chicken and Egg.' 2005
- Fields of Gaffney "Nature Walk" CD, 2003
- Brilliant Concert Numbers CD, Old Gold Records, 1999
- In The Noonday Sun (Animal Friends) 2002
- Another Galaxy (Animal Friends) 1999
- Yosemite Sam Lunchbox (Animal Friends) 1997
- Portland Or Bust (Animal Friends) 1991
- Moldy Bread (Animal Friends) 1989
- Face Of Man (Animal Friends) 1989
- Sore Foot Weirdy (Animal Friends) 1988

=== Singles and compilation albums ===
- "The Dunes" on 'Down in a Mirror" Jandek tribute Vol II (Summersteps Records, Moscow, PA.)
- "Wanna Be With You/Long Journey" split 7-inch with Pernath, Morc Records, 2004
- "Pinball Machine" track on Cool Beans #15 CD, 2003
- "Too Bad Luck" on "What, Are You on Drugs? Comp. CD (Ant Lunch, Florida) 2002
- "Paws On Paws Off" track on "Lo-Fi" CD from São Paulo, Brazil, 2002
- "Cold Weather" b/w Twilight, Sub Pop Singles Club, January 2000
- "The Other Day" track on Cool Beans CD Sampler, 1999

=== Cassette releases ===
- "Fields of Gaffney vol. 2" Limited Edition Cassette, 1999
- "Lights Up and Spins Around" Limited Edition cassette, 1998
- 'Family Grub' cassette comp 1990
- 'Happy Valley Screwball Institute' cassette comp (90 min) 1990
  - Sebadoh 'The Freed Man' 1988 (30 min cassette)
- Gracefully Aging Hippy Soloists 1986 'Plundering Latenight' cassette 90 min
- Grey Matter, cassette 1983

=== Records with Sebadoh (1988–2008) ===
- 'Bubble & Scrape' 15th Anniversary Reissue. 2008 Domino (UK) Sub Pop (U.S.)
- 'The Freed Man' (tracks from the original cassette, vinyl LP, and CD, the first singles, previously unreleased tracks) 2007 (Domino) *'Wade Through The Boggs' (1990–1993 era unreleased Sebadoh tracks) ltd edition 1,000)
- Sebadoh III (Domino Records) reissue w. 2nd CD of bonus tracks. 2006
- "Tarred and Furthered," "Delicious Cakes" from 1990 EP (Silt Breeze Records) 1999
- "Beauty of the Ride" EP (drums on "16" and "Slintstrumental," BBC sessions '92-93) 1996
- "Bakesale" (drums on 4 songs from 1993 Chicago session with Bob Weston) (Sub Pop/Domino) 1994
- "Bubble & Scrape" (Sub Pop/Domino) 1993. City Slang (Berlin) Sony (Japan) 1993
- bonus single w. LP in UK, (Domino)
- "Soul & Fire EP" (Domino/Sub Pop) 1993
- "Bouquet For A Siren" (1st version) 1993
- "Smash Your Head On The Punk Rock"(Sub Pop) 1992
- "Rockin' The Forest Vs. Helmet" (City Slang, Germany) Oct 1992
- "Sebadoh Vs. Helmet" (Domino, U.K.) October, 1992
- "Rockin' The Forest" (20/20, Domino U.K.) Summer, 1992
- Split-single -"Loma Prieta" (Dark Beloved Cloud) 1991
- "Oven Is My Friend" 45 rpm EP (Silt Breeze) 1991
- "Sebadoh III" (Homestead) 1991
- "Gimme Indie Rock" 45 rpm single (Homestead) 1991
- "The Freed Weed" (Homestead) 1990
- "Asshole" (Vertical) one side; "Julienne," "Elements," "Attention," "Your Long Journey." 1990
- "Magic Ribbons" (Leopard Gecko) Box Set (split single, 45 rpm red vinyl) "Design," "Cyster," *"Lorax," 1989
- "The Freed Man" (Homestead) Vinyl/Cassette, 1989
- "Split single" with Big Stick (Sonic Life) U.K.1989
- 'The Freed Man' cassette (no label) 1988
