= Sebadoh =

American indie rock band

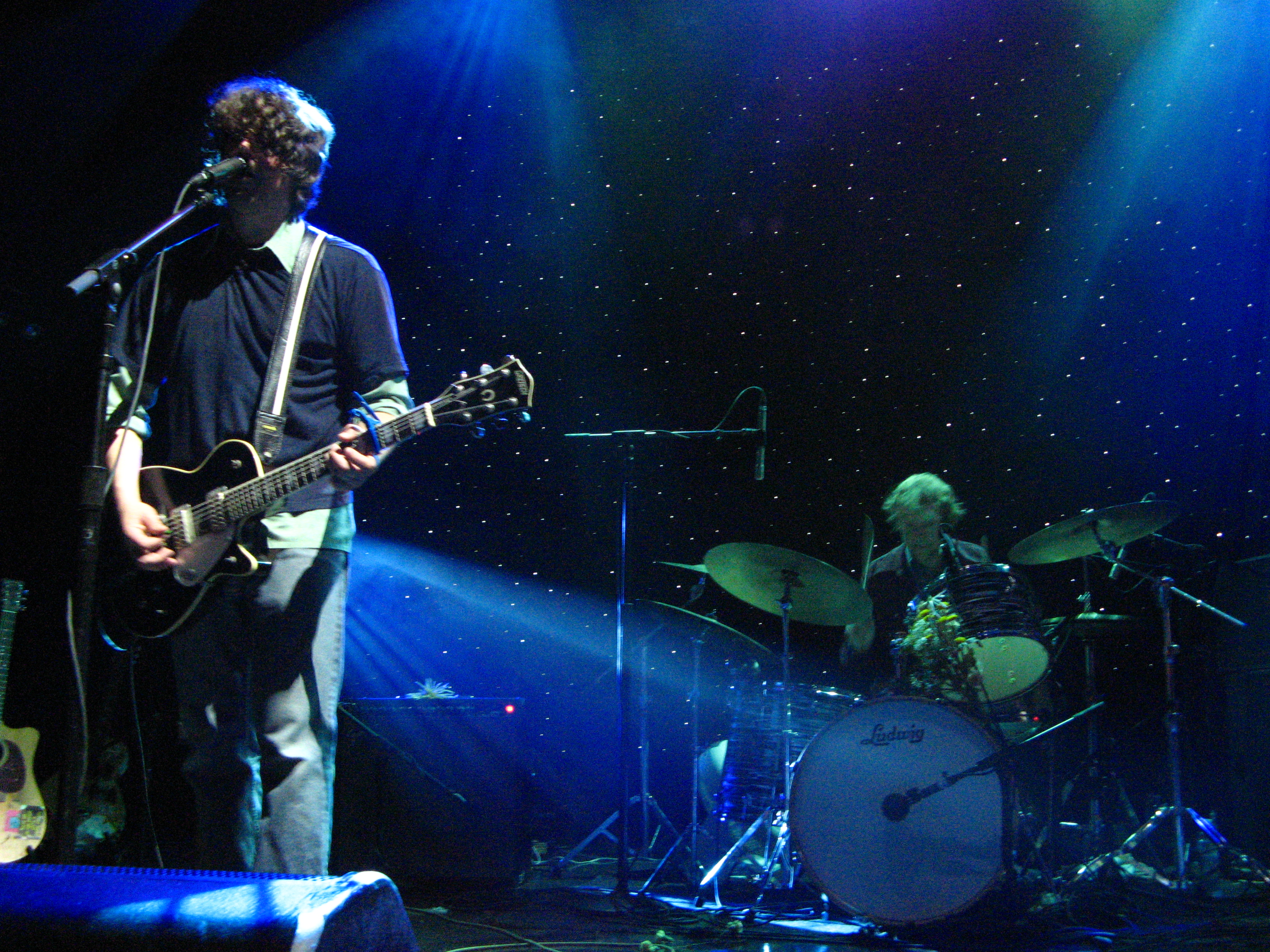
- Sebadoh performing live in July 2007

Background information
- Origin: Northampton, Massachusetts, U.S.
- Genres: Indie rock; slacker rock
- Works: Sebadoh discography
- Years active: 1986–present
- Labels: Joyful Noise; Dangerbird; Domino; Sub Pop; Homestead; City Slang; Siltbreeze; Vertical
- Members: Lou Barlow; Jason Loewenstein; Bob D'Amico
- Past members: Eric Gaffney; Bob Fay; Russell Pollard
- Website: sebadoh.com

Sebadoh (/ˈsɛbədoʊ/) is an American indie rock band formed in 1986 in Northampton, Massachusetts, by Eric Gaffney and Lou Barlow, with multi-instrumentalist Jason Loewenstein completing the line-up in 1989. Barlow co-created Sebadoh as an outlet for his songwriting when J. Mascis gradually took over creative control of Dinosaur Jr., in which Barlow plays bass guitar.

Along with such bands as Pavement, Beat Happening and Guided by Voices, Sebadoh helped pioneer a lo-fi style of indie rock characterized by low-fidelity recording techniques that employed four-track cassette tape machines. The band's early output, such as The Freed Man and Weed Forestin' (both released 1990), as well as Sebadoh III (1991), was typical of this style. Following the release of Bubble & Scrape in 1993, Gaffney left the band. His replacement and erstwhile stand-in, Bob Fay, appeared on Bakesale (1994) and Harmacy (1996), but was fired before the sessions for the band's major label release The Sebadoh (1999), featuring drummer Russ Pollard.

The band then paused recording for 14 years. The group, fronted by Barlow and now featuring drummer Bob D'Amico, returned in 2012 with Secret EP and, in 2013, a full-length album titled Defend Yourself, which were both self-recorded. The album Act Surprised followed in 2019.

== History ==
Lou Barlow was the bass player for alternative rock band Dinosaur Jr. (originally Dinosaur) in the 1980s. While both Barlow and leader J Mascis wrote songs, Mascis' material dominated the group's output because Barlow was intimidated by the guitarist's songwriting efforts. Barlow spent progressively more time recording his own songs at home. Barlow and Eric Gaffney released the Weed Forestin' cassette in 1987 on Homestead Records under the name Sebadoh, which was a nonsense word Barlow often muttered in his recordings. Both Barlow and Gaffney contributed songs to The Freed Man (1988) cassette. Homestead Records head Gerard Cosloy heard the cassette release of The Freed Man and released it as a full-length album on Homestead in 1989. Soon after the cassette's release Barlow was kicked out of Dinosaur Jr. Over time Sebadoh's releases became a way for Barlow to address the issues of control that manifested as the tension in and his ejection from Dinosaur Jr; Barlow said "I got a lot of hatred out just by writing those songs." Jason Loewenstein joined in summer 1989, the first release that he played on being the "Gimme Indie Rock" single in 1991. Only ten 'band' shows were performed throughout Western Massachusetts, Boston, and New York over the period 1989–1990 before the third album, Sebadoh III, was released.

After touring with Firehose in 1991, they signed to Sub Pop (Domino in the UK and City Slang in Germany) in 1992, and released the two EPs Rocking the Forest and Sebadoh vs. Helmet just two months apart. These EPs had their track listings truncated and shuffled around and made into the American full-length release Smash Your Head on the Punk Rock. Their fourth album Bubble & Scrape was released in April 1993. The same year, the band's "Soul and Fire" EP humorously described the band's musical goal as "driving dozens of college-age lemmings off the cliff of limited imagination."

Following Bubble & Scrape (1993) Gaffney left the band. Gaffney has stated that he left Sebadoh "because I felt like it" and went on to explain that: "I wanted to start a band where I was the songwriter/guitar player and so I did. I also had the garage practice space and booked all our early shows. This was summer 1989, when The Freed Man LP was released on Homestead was when I called those guys on the phone to ask if they wanted to start a band, met with dead silence. Me on the other end saying, “Are you still there?” I only started playing drums when the other guys wanted to play their songs because I didn’t want to learn bass lines, and drums are my first instrument. Four years later I let the whole thing walk away from me. It was like The Blob—you want to just run out of the theater! (lest you be consumed by “The Blob.”)."

Barlow has stated that the mood in the band upon Gaffney's departure was "euphoric," explaining that: "Eric was a difficult guy. He was really struggling with the band becoming more popular; he was really struggling with sharing the spotlight with me. He’s an absolute leader, and deserves a spotlight of his own, but I had kind of forced him into this band where he and I were going to be trading off, thinking that was a really great idea. Eric Gaffney did not want to be doing that. Eric Gaffney wanted to be front and center—which is great, I mean, I believed in him. I’m an Eric Gaffney fan, that’s why I was playing in a band with him, but Eric Gaffney was not a Lou Barlow fan. So him leaving the band was awesome. All of this resistance just disappeared for a while, and it was really nice."

Gaffney's replacement, Bob Fay, appeared on Bakesale (1994) and the follow-up Harmacy in 1996. Gaffney had quit the band three times between 1990 and 1993, being replaced each time by Fay. Fay recorded and toured with the band during those years, performing on half the tracks of Rocking the Forest, including the Fay composition "Mind Meld," and two tracks on Sebadoh vs. Helmet, whose cover image is a photograph of Fay. Fay was fired before the sessions for The Sebadoh (1999) and replaced by Russ Pollard, a friend of Loewenstein's from Louisville. The band went on a tour to promote this album, including a stop in Toronto in March. The band then went on hiatus, with Barlow concentrating on his other project, the Folk Implosion, and Loewenstein working on material for his debut solo album At Sixes and Sevens, released in 2002. The two reunited to play concerts in late 2003 and early 2004.

In March 2007, the "Sebadoh Classic" lineup of Barlow, Gaffney and Loewenstein went on tour together for the first time in fourteen years. This coincided with a new series of reissues which repackaged some of the early albums with extra discs of unreleased tracks. First came a reissue of Sebadoh III, then The Freed Man, and Bubble & Scrape.

The reunion tour continued into 2008, and in May included a live performance of Bubble & Scrape (1993) in its entirety as part of the All Tomorrow's Parties curated Don't Look Back series at London's Koko venue.

In 2011, Sebadoh toured in support of reissues for their Bakesale and Harmacy albums. Though Bakesale was reissued on time, the reissue for Harmacy was not relesead until November 2026. Taking the place of Gaffney on drums was Bob D'Amico, who plays with Loewenstein in both Circle of Buzzards and the Fiery Furnaces.

In March 2012, Lou Barlow reissued the early recordings of Weed Forrestin' on the Sebadoh bandcamp, available in a digital download, double cd, vinyl, and deluxe edition with the Child of the Apocalypse sessions as a cassette tape. Fifty copies of "Weed Forrestin" came as a surprise bonus with purchases of the limited edition re-release of Dinosaur Jr.'s first three albums in a cassette boxed set released by Joyful Noise in 2012.

They were chosen by Jeff Mangum of Neutral Milk Hotel to perform at the All Tomorrow's Parties festival that he curated in March 2012 in Minehead, England.

In July 2012, Sebadoh released Secret EP on the Sebadoh bandcamp, available in a digital download. CD copies were only available at the shows of their 2012 tour. In June 2013, Joyful Noise released it on vinyl.

Their eighth studio album, Defend Yourself, came out on Joyful Noise Recordings on September 17, 2013. It debuted at No. 1 on the "New Alternative Artists" Billboard chart.

On March 1, 2019, the band announced that their ninth studio album Act Surprised will be released on May 24, 2019, via Dangerbird Records. The same day the first single off the album, "Celebrate the Void" was released.

== Style ==
According to Stephen Thomas Erlewine of AllMusic, "Sebadoh embraced intentionally raw and unsophisticated home recording as the element that tied together their self-conscious sentimental pop with their noisy experimentalism." Lou Barlow's vocals have been described as "gloomy but tuneful."

== Members ==
=== Current members ===
- Lou Barlow – vocals, guitar, bass (1986–present)
- Jason Loewenstein – vocals, bass, drums, guitar (1989–present)
- Bob D'Amico – drums, percussion (2011–present)

=== Former members ===
- Eric Gaffney – vocals, drums, guitar (1986–1994, 2007–2011)
- Bob Fay – drums, vocals (1994–1998)
- Russell Pollard – drums (1998–2000)

== Discography ==
=== Studio albums ===
- The Freed Man (1989)
- Weed Forestin' (1990)
- Sebadoh III (1991)
- Bubble & Scrape (1993)
- Bakesale (1994)
- Harmacy (1996)
- The Sebadoh (1999)
- Defend Yourself (2013)
- Act Surprised (2019)

=== Compilation albums ===
- The Freed Weed (1990)
- Smash Your Head on the Punk Rock (1992)
- Wade Through the Boggs (2007)

== Bibliography ==
- Azerrad, Michael. Our Band Could Be Your Life. New York: Little, Brown, 2001. ISBN 0-316-78753-1
