= J and Friends Sing and Chant for Amma =

J and Friends Sing and Chant For Amma

Studio album by J Mascis and Friends
- Released: 2005
- Recorded: 2005
- Genre: Alternative rock
- Length: 44:38
- Label: Baked Goods Records
- Producer: none credited (presumably J Mascis)

J Mascis and Friends chronology
The John Peel Sessions (2003)	J and Friends Sing and Chant For Amma (2005)

Professional ratings
Review scores
Source	Rating
Allmusic	4/5 stars

J and Friends Sing And Chant For Amma is an album-length compact disc by American guitarist/singer/songwriter and Dinosaur Jr bandleader J Mascis. The CD consists of several devotional songs composed and/or adapted by Mascis and dedicated to Hindu religious leader Mata Amritanandamayi, or Ammachi, of whom Mascis is a devoted follower. Recorded during a banner year for the alternative icon, Sing and Chant For Amma was self-released by Mascis on his own Baked Goods label during a break in the Dinosaur Jr reunion tour. Although there are no production or studio credits on the album, the CD is presumed to have been produced by Mascis and recorded at his own Bob's Place Studio in Amherst, Massachusetts.

The proceeds from the album are being donated to tsunami relief and other efforts Ammachi's organization is spearheading.

Mascis had previously written the song "Ammaring" about Ammachi, and recorded it on the first J Mascis and the Fog album More Light.

== Track listing ==
1. "Please Remember That I'm Here"
2. "Help Me Amma"
3. "Lokah"
4. "Take Me Home"
5. "Amma What Now?"
6. "Heavy Metal Ai Giri Nandini"

== Personnel ==
- J Mascis – vocals, acoustic and electric guitars
- "Devadas" Andrew Labrecque – vocals, drums, doumbek
- Nina – dholak
- Tony – vocals, flute
- Akshay – vocals on "Heavy Metal Ai Giri Nandini"
- Mahesh – drums on "Heavy Metal Ai Giri Nandini"
