= Frenchy and the Punk =

American post-punk band

- Origin: New York City, United States
- Genres: Post-punk
- Years active: 2005–present
- Label: EA Recordings
- Website: www.frenchyandthepunk.com

Frenchy and the Punk is an American post-punk duo based in New York City, formed in 2005 by punk guitarist Scott Helland, formerly of hardcore bands Deep Wound and Outpatients, and singer Samantha Stephenson. The group was originally called The Gypsy Nomads, but adopted the name Frenchy and the Punk ahead of their first European tour in 2011.

The band's sound has "elements of post-punk and dark folk". They were listed in the top 25 duos in May 2012 by Yahoo Music Blog's List of the Day.

== History ==
Stephenson was born in Lyon, France. Her autobiographical song "Yes! I’m French" includes the line "When those jokers served up freedom fries / I saw Lady Liberty rolling her eyes." They released the all-French album Eternal Summer in 2008, with Stephenson described as "crooning sultry, original French pop tunes in a classy cabaret fashion."

In the 1980s, guitarist Scott Helland was a founding member of the Massachusetts hardcore punk bands Deep Wound (with J Mascis and Lou Barlow), and Outpatients. He was also a member of the New York hardcore bands School of Violence and Darkside NYC in the 1990s. He began releasing solo instrumental records in 1996, and launched the all-instrumental surf-themed project Guitarmy of One, which released two albums in the late 2000s.

The duo has been touring year-round since 2005. In 2014, after the release of their 4th full-length album, Bonjour Batfrog, Frenchy and the Punk performed at Scotland's Edinburgh Fringe festival. In 2016, they performed in England, Canada and across the United States. In 2019 they performed in Grand Lahou, Ivory Coast.

In January 2019 they released a video for the song Lanky Bell Bottoms from their forth-coming album Hooray Beret. The 10-track album was released in April 2019, with three music videos for the songs "Sing", "Wah", and "Lanky Bell Bottoms", and two lyric videos for "Monsters" and "Fastball".

== Discography ==
See also Scott Helland

=== Albums ===
Year	Title	Name	Label
2007	Thread & Stone	The Gypsy Nomads	Exotic Aquatic Recordings
2008	Eternal Summer	The Gypsy Nomads	Exotic Aquatic Recordings
2008	At the Carnivale Eclectique	The Gypsy Nomads	Exotic Aquatic Recordings
2010	Happy Madness	Frenchy and the Punk	EA Recordings
2011	Live at Bube's Brewery DVD	Frenchy and the Punk	EA Recordings
2012	Hey Hey Cabaret	Frenchy and the Punk	EA Recordings
2013	Elephant Uproar	Frenchy and the Punk	EA Recordings
2014	Cartwheels EP	Frenchy and the Punk	EA Recordings
2014	Bonjour Batfrog	Frenchy and the Punk	EA Recordings
2016	Batfrog Tracks Lyric & Photo Book	Frenchy and the Punk	Paris Punk Press
2019	Hooray Beret	Frenchy and the Punk	EA Recordings
2020	The Storm is Call for Rebuilding (Single)	Frenchy and the Punk	EA Recordings
2021	Hanging on the Telephone (Cover)	Frenchy and the Punk	EA Recordings
2022	Zen Ghost	Frenchy and the Punk	EA Recordings
2023	Cities in Dust (Cover)	Frenchy and the Punk	EA Recordings
2024	Midnight Garden	Frenchy and the Punk	EA Recordings
2025	Dark Carnivale (Hi-Fi Hillary Remix)	Frenchy and the Punk	EA Recordings
2025	Not Under Your Spell (Single)	Frenchy and the Punk	Distortion Productions
2026	War on War (Single)	Frenchy and the Punk	Distortion Productions
