= Luluc =

Australian band

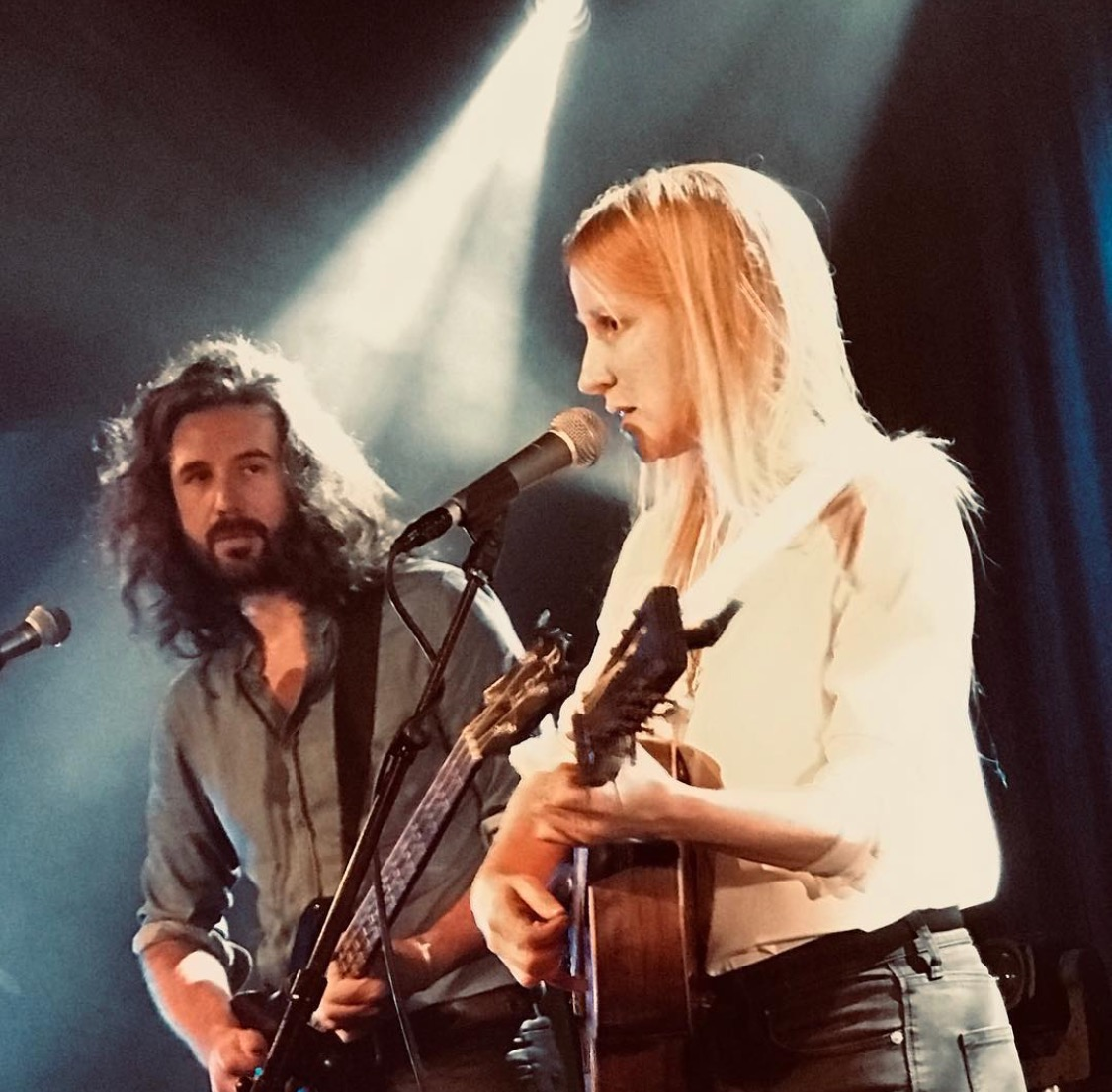
- Luluc, in November 2021

Background information
- Origin: Melbourne
- Years active: 2009–present
- Labels: Sun Chaser Records, Sub Pop, Mistletone, Community Music (current)
- Members: Zoë Randell; Steven Hassett
- Website: www.luluc.org

Luluc (Lou-Luke) are an Australian band, consisting of Zoë Randell and Steve Hassett. They are based in Brooklyn, New York. Luluc have released five highly esteemed albums; Dear Hamlyn, Passerby, Sculptor on Sub Pop records and Mistletone Records (for Aus/NZ), Dreamboat (Sun Chaser Records) and Diamonds in September 2023 (Community Music).

== Albums ==
=== Diamonds – 2023 ===
In late 2022, Luluc met with Los Angeles-based manager/music supervisor Bryan Ling from New Community Mgmt, and the band later signed with the Los Angeles-based record label Community Records. Diamonds, Luluc's fifth studio album, was released September 15, 2023.

Diamonds has received widespread critical acclaim. Timothy Monger at AllMusic declared "Luluc are unlikely candidates to create a classic American road song and yet, with the title track they do just that...Each album in the band's catalog is a gem and Diamonds, with its dream-like tone and bouquet of lived-in stories, is perhaps their brightest."

UNCUT reflected "Zoe Randell's low reverberant voice, like Nico fronting Morphine. This is, though, an album of upbeat rebirth, born from considered reflection". Mojo highlighted "Randell's voice is so crystalline, so deadpan it's spooky...see this as Townes Van Zandt were he refracted through the lens of Mazzy Star".

Bob Fish from Folk Music concluded "Using sonic simplicity, Luluc manage to change the rules of the game with Diamonds. Their glorious visions deliver a magic that reaffirms what we are and what we can be".

Bob Boilen featured the "Diamonds" single in his NPR New Music Mix, and Best Releases, in September 2023. "Diamonds" was also featured on Guy Garvey's Finest Hour on BBC6.

=== Dreamboat – 2020 ===
In 2020, Luluc decided against a Sub Pop record deal offer on Dreamboat, citing frustration with the lag in release schedule. "We really felt the need to be more nimble, to release the work on our schedule, rather than through the label machinations which have an inevitable lag. So it was an artistic decision..." The band created Sun Chaser Records label and released Dreamboat in October 2020.

Dreamboat was released to significant praise. Jay Ruttenberg in The New Yorker wrote "Throughout Dreamboat, Luluc's fourth album, Randell's singing is crystalline and unflappable, with a strange beauty that verges on creepy—it's the kind of voice that, on a movie soundtrack, portends unspeakable doom". Uncut Magazine wrote, "Randell's vocals, timeless and pure, carries something of a myth-making quality in its timbre" (January 2021).

NPR All Songs Considered featured Dreamboat upon release and Emerald City in Bob Boilen's Top 40 songs of 2020". Narc magazine reflected "perhaps the real triumph of Luluc's Dreamboat is the consistent lullaby/Karen Carpenter vocal delivery of Zoe Randell and her ability to find memorable, interesting, pop melodies within each of the different sonic textures". Shindig noted "These are modern watercolors of ruminative elegance with an understated hypnotic flair".

Dreamboat was recorded partly in Berlin at PEOPLE festival and in Brooklyn, New York. Guest musicians included Aaron Dessner (The National), drummers JT Bates (Bon Iver), Jason Treuting (Sō Percussion), CJ Camerieri (yMusic) on trumpet; and saxophonist Stuart Bogie (Arcade Fire).

=== Sculptor – 2018 ===
Sculptor was released on Sub Pop on 13 July 2018. Sculptor was produced by Steve Hassett and Zoe Randell in Ditmas Park, Brooklyn. It featured guest appearances from J Mascis, Aaron Dessner and Jim White among others. In its first month of release, it won worldwide praise including Uncut Magazine's Album of the Month and 4 star and 8/10 reviews in The Guardian, Mojo, Line of Best Fit, Under the Radar and Q Magazine. Sculptor received BBC6 and BBC2 airplay, including on Iggy Pop's LA Confidential

Mojo observed that "Sculptor yields centre-stage to Randell's haiku-like celebrations of human spirit and suburban transcendence". Uncut declared "Sculptor is the strongest and most assured record of their career. The songs dig deep emotionally – but critically their aesthetics are well-balanced, the voice and instruments perfectly calibrated...Sculptor is wide open". Line of Best Fit concluded "Ultimately, the album repays careful and repeated attention, its varied qualities cohering effectively with a measured sense of control". Live reviews have also been full of praise "Randall's voice was warm and rich with each lyric that fell on the audience...Their overall sound was marked by a timelessness that also felt avant-garde in its minimalism".

=== Passerby – 2014 ===
Passerby has consistently received outstanding reviews and was listed as the number one album of 2014 by NPR Music's Bob Boilen and Stephen Thompson. Passerby was released on Sub Pop on 15 July 2014, the album was co-produced by Aaron Dessner of The National, and recorded at his studio in Brooklyn. Sub Pop co-founder Jonathan Poneman, met and signed the band within 48 hours of hearing the master recordings. Poneman was sent the Passerby Masters by Peter Blackstock, co-founder of No Depression magazine.

The Wall Street Journal named Passerby as one of their best fifteen albums of 2014. Wilco named Passerby one of their "favourite recent releases" in 2015. The album received 4 and 5 star reviews in Mojo, Bust, AllMusic and Lesinrocks amongst others. Passerby was number one added to CMJ radio in its week of release. Dave Di Martino wrote in Rolling Stone USA that the record is a "timeless, quietly special set" and that "Passerby is gorgeous and refined through and through".

=== Dear Hamlyn – 2008 ===
Luluc released their debut album, Dear Hamlyn, in 2008; the songs were written following the death of Randell's father. Dear Hamlyn eventually gained a large group of influential admirers. Peter Blackstock co-founder of No Depression magazine, wrote of the album, "The most beautiful album I've heard in ten years". In 2011 Nick Drake's producer, Joe Boyd, also taken by Dear Hamlyn, invited Luluc to feature in his Nick Drake tribute tour. They contributed the tracks "Things Behind the Sun" and "Fly" to the live tribute album, Way to Blue: The Songs of Nick Drake in 2013. Dear Hamlyn was reissued and given worldwide release on Sub Pop Records on March 8, 2019.

== Collaborations ==
Randell co-wrote the music on The National song "Pink Rabbits" from their 2013 album, Trouble Will Find Me.

Luluc sang backing vocals on the Leonard Cohen song "Listen to the Hummingbird" on Cohens final album, Thanks for the Dance. They were invited by Nick Drake's manager/producer, Joe Boyd, to cover Drake's songs as part of the Way to Blue: The Songs of Nick Drake tour and live album. Luluc's version of "Things Behind the Sun" was chosen as a lead single. Randell sang harmonies on J Mascis (Dinosaur Jr.) song "I Went Dust" from Elastic Days. Hassett sang backing vocals on The National song "Lean" which was recorded for The Hunger Games: Catching Fire – Original Motion Picture Soundtrack.

Luluc covers include:

- the Townes Van Zandt song "None But the Rain", for the More Townes from the Great Unknown compilation
- The Flatlanders' song "Keeper of the Mountain", for the Italian magazine OndaRock's Outlaw Country compilation; and
- the 1934 standard "Blue Moon", for RISING Festival's lunar-themed Singles Club series.

Luluc performed the Doug Sahm song "Sunday Sunny Mill Valley Groove Day" at the 2015 Doug Sahm Tribute concert in Austin, Texas. They collaborated with Xylouris White (Jim White (drummer) of Dirty Three, and Cretan Lute Master Giorgos Xylouris) on a cover of The Grateful Dead's "Til the Morning Comes" for the tribute album Day of the Dead. The project was curated by Aaron Dessner and Bryce Dessner of The National, with proceeds benefitting the Red Hot Organization. Hassett and Randell sang backing vocals on Big Red Machine; the collaborative project between Justin Vernon and Aaron Dessner.

== Touring ==
Luluc have toured North America, Europe, Australia and New Zealand. They have toured with The National, J Mascis, Dinosaur Jr., Father John Misty, Fleet Foxes, Jose Gonzalez and Lucinda Williams among others.

Luluc have performed at numerous festivals around the world including; All Tomorrow's Parties (Curated by The National), Golden Plains Festival, Wilco's Solid Sound Festival, the Newport Folk Festival, St Jerome's Laneway Festival, SXSW, the 2018 PEOPLE Festival at the Funkhaus in Berlin and more. Luluc have performed at major venues worldwide including the Lincoln Center for the Performing Arts as part of the 2016 American Songbook series, The Sydney Opera House and the O2 Apollo Manchester.

== Television appearances ==
Luluc recorded at NPR Music's 'Tiny Desk' in September 2014. Host Bob Boilen remarked "I've spent more time listening to Luluc's second album, Passerby, than any other album this year. It's a calming, seemingly effortless affair: a marriage of graceful singing and storytelling, with guitars and textures that help create an unforgettable aura".

Luluc performed numerous songs live for Other Voices in 2014, including Passerby where they were joined by Aaron Dessner and Little Suitcase (Zoe performing solo). Their songs, "I Found You" (Season 6, episode 19) and "One Day Soon" (Season 6, episode 21) were featured on ABC's Grey's Anatomy. "Kids" was featured on the Australian ABC TV Series 2 of Mystery Road directed by Warwick Thornton, Wayne Blair and Rachel Perkins. Luluc's "Gold on the Leaves" was featured on Season 10, episode 4 of Criminal Minds; and "Star" was featured on Season 6, episode 6 of Parenthood.

== Discography ==
=== Albums ===
- Dear Hamlyn - 2008
- Passerby - 2014
- Sculptor - 2018
- Dreamboat - 2020
- Diamonds - 2023
- Sweet Thief - 2026
