= Start Choppin =

Single by Dinosaur Jr.

from the album Where You Been
- Released: 1993
- Recorded: 1992
- Genre: Alternative rock; bubblegum pop
- Length: 5:39
- Songwriter: J Mascis

Dinosaur Jr. singles chronology
"Get Me" (1992)	"Start Choppin" (1993)	"Out There" (1993)

"Start Choppin" is a song by Dinosaur Jr. written by J Mascis and taken from their fifth album Where You Been. Created after Mascis came up with the title phrase, the song was accompanied by a music video that aired on alternative rock music programs.

"Start Choppin" was released as a single through Blanco Y Negro in Europe and as a promo by Warner Brothers in the US. It was backed by the song "Turnip Farm", co-written by Kurt Fedora. It has since been praised by critics as a highlight of Where You Been.

== Background ==
Written by Dinosaur Jr. frontman J Mascis, "Start Choppin" was recorded for the band's 1993 album Where You Been. Mascis recalled the song's creation in an interview, saying:

I remember the title came about because we cut the tape to put some different versions together. I think I just said, "Start chopping," or something. All the stops and starts is just how the song was written. I think the edits were just, like, maybe the verse sounded better on one take, so we could end the whole thing. It wasn't very big edits on tape; it was little things. It was just like one verse or another.

A music video for the song was recorded, gaining popularity on MTV alternative rock programs such as 120 Minutes and Alternative Nation.

== Release and reception ==
Released as the debut single from Where You Been, "Start Choppin" reached number 20 on the UK Singles Chart and number 3 on the US Modern Rock Tracks. The song was described by AllMusic as having a "quick, catchy lead riff," and being "as close to a radio hit as the band ever had." CMJ magazine referred J Mascis' as a "guitar god" through his work with this song. Spin described the song as having a "sparkly stutter-strum intro, grindy-swirly solo freak-out" and the lyrical content as "another J Mascis paean to self-denial as a source of pride." Nick Soulsby of PopMatters called the song "a catchy confection of bubblegum pop, all sky-scraping solos and upbeat strummed riffs" and praised the track as a "vocally ... a Mascis masterclass."

== Accolades and legacy ==
The song was ranked the 45th best of the year by Select. Pitchfork included the album in "The Pitchfork 500" in 2008. Two years later, they would go on to rank it 93rd on their list of "The Top 200 Tracks of the 1990s", writing that the song was where Mascis "finally, comfortably takes on the mantle" of "guitar gods" and describing the song itself as "assured, [...] direct, [...] breezy and effortless [...]-- a perfect balance of the scene the band had come from and who they really were." WOXY.com ranked it 271st on their combined list of the 500 best modern rock songs of all time.

== Track list ==
Below is the track list for both sides of the single.

Side A

1. "Start Choppin" (J. Mascis) – 5:39

Side B

1. "Turnip Farm" (Mascis, Kurt Fedora) – 5:49
2. "Forget It" (Mascis) – 4:04

== Charts ==
Chart (1993)	Peak position
Ireland (IRMA)	20
Sweden (Sverigetopplistan)	40
UK Singles (OCC)	20
US Alternative Airplay (Billboard)	3
