= Tim Aaron =

American musician

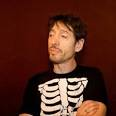

Background information
- Also known as: TimAaron
- Born: Washington, D.C., United States
- Occupations: Musician, composer, sound mixer
- Instruments: Guitar, Bass, Vocals
- Years active: 1989–present
- Labels: New Alliance, Thick, Diesel Meat Records, Serpiando Records, Missing Records
- Member of: GobbleHoof, Skunk
- Website: www.timaaron.com

Tim Aaron (a.k.a. TimAaron) is an American musician, composer, and sound designer. He is a multi-instrumentalist, known mainly for his work as a guitar player, and is active in indie rock and post-punk revival through performance and the establishment of the music label, Missing Records. As a founding member of the band GobbleHoof, he played a role in the psychedelic punk grunge scene in the early 1990s. He also performed extensively in other music groups, including Skunk, Model/Actress, Merrick, H.P. Zinker, and for Lisa Marie Presley. He is currently the frontman for the Los Angeles band The Brite Sides.

== Biography ==
Tim Aaron was born in Washington, D.C., on October 15, 1965. He is the only child of David L. Aaron, an American diplomat who served as Deputy National Security Advisor to President Jimmy Carter and Chloe Aaron, former deputy director of the National Endowment for the Arts and Senior Vice President of the Public Broadcasting Service. He is also the grandson of Abe Aaron, a jazz saxophonist in the Bob Hope Orchestra. Tim Aaron attended The Stowe School in rural Vermont as a teenager, where he was guided into music through an experimental educational program that focused on the arts. Aaron received a BA from Hampshire College, studying the Schillinger System of music with jazz/experimental legends Roland Wiggins, Yusef Lateef, Bill Harris, and Eugene Chadbourne. He also studied filmmaking with photography pioneers Jerome Liebling and Carrie Weems. During that time, he formed GobbleHoof with Charlie Nakajima, Jens Jurgenson of Boss Hog, and J Mascis of Dinosaur Jr., who played drums on GobbleHoof EP (1990), the band's first release on New Alliance Records. Mascis produced the band's second album, Freezer Burn (1992, New Alliance). GobbleHoof toured the U.S. and Europe, opening for bands including Dinosaur Jr. and Nirvana.

In the early 1990s, Aaron lived in New York City and performed in various bands such as GobbleHoof, H.P. Zinker, and Skunk. Skunk was the first musical venture of Matt Sweeney, who later became known as a session guitarist and founding member of Chavez. Billy Corgan of the 1990s Billboard chart-topping band Smashing Pumpkins credited Skunk as a major influence.

In the mid-1990s, Aaron moved to Los Angeles. There, he met directors Tom Stern and Penelope Spheeris, who hired him as a mixer, composer, and sound designer for films, music videos, and television shows. Aaron and Stern formed the performance art band Spork with actress Laura Niemi, and the group briefly toured with Marilyn Manson. Aaron is also a member of the bands Model/Actress, featuring David Yow of Jesus Lizard, and Merrick, an indie rock group led by singer-songwriters Bryony Atkinson and Inara George.

== Discography ==
GobbleHoof

- GobbleHoof (1989) New Alliance Records
- FreezerBurn (1992) New Alliance Records
- Headbanger (1992) New Alliance Records
- Ecstasy Inn (1993) Jama Disc Big Fish in a Little Sea
- We're All Normal and We Want Our Freedom: A Tribute to Arthur Lee & Love (1995) Alias Records
- Tricks and Treats (2015) Missing Records

H.P. Zinker

- We're All Normal and We Want Our Freedom: A Tribute to Arthur Lee & Love (1995) Alias Records

Skunk

- 4PLAY (2015) Missing Records

Merrick

- Merrick (2001) Diesel Meat Music BMI
- Drive Around a Lot Hard and Fast Driving Club (2001) Serpiando Records

The Brite Sides

- Photon Rides (2015) Missing Records
