= Martin + Me =

Live album by J Mascis
- Released: 1996
- Genre: Alternative rock
- Label: Baked Goods/Reprise
- Producer: J Mascis

J Mascis chronology
Martin + Me (1996)	More Light (2000)

Martin + Me is a solo album by the American musician J Mascis, his first. It was released in 1996.

The album documents a 1995 solo acoustic tour. The Martin of the title refers to Mascis's Martin guitar. The album contains Dinosaur Jr. songs as well as covers of Carly Simon, Greg Sage, Lynyrd Skynyrd, and others.

== Critical reception ==
Professional ratings
Review scores
Source	Rating
AllMusic	3/5 stars
The Encyclopedia of Popular Music	3/5 stars
Entertainment Weekly	B
The Indianapolis Star	3/4 stars
MusicHound Rock: The Essential Album Guide	4/5 stars

The album received mixed reviews, with some critics comparing Mascis (both favorably and unfavorably) to Neil Young. Rolling Stone wrote that "these bare-bones interpretations add nothing to the songs besides a new vocal and lyrical clarity, and considering the annoying nature of Mascis' nasal whine and the tossed-off quality of his lyrics, that isn't a good thing." The Indianapolis Star opined that, "while Mascis doesn't have a singing voice conducive to an acoustic setting (though he's better off than, say, Tom Waits), his screechy Neil Young-like voice makes the best of it."

== Track listing ==
All tracks composed by J Mascis, except where noted

No.	Title	Writer(s)	Length
1.	"Thumb"		3:11
2.	"So What Else Is New"		3:43
3.	"Get Me"		2:49
4.	"Blowin It"		2:47
5.	"Repulsion"		2:54
6.	"Goin Home"		3:40
7.	"The Boy with the Thorn in His Side"	Johnny Marr, Morrissey	1:58
8.	"Not You Again"		2:09
9.	"On the Run"	Greg Sage	2:14
10.	"Keeblin"		2:36
11.	"Flying Cloud"		2:27
12.	"Anticipation"	Carly Simon	2:57
13.	"Drawerings"		4:30
14.	"Every Mother's Son"	Allen Collins, Ronnie Van Zant	3:02
