= Out There (Dinosaur Jr. song) =

Single by Dinosaur Jr.

from the album Where You Been
- Released: 1993
- Recorded: 1992
- Genre: Grunge
- Length: 5:53
- Label: Blanco y Negro
- Songwriter: J Mascis

Dinosaur Jr. singles chronology
"Start Choppin" (1992)	"Out There" (1993)	"Feel the Pain" (1994)

"Out There" is a song by Dinosaur Jr. written by J Mascis and taken from their 1993 album Where You Been. Notable for its guitar solo and use of chimes, "Out There" was a moderate alternative radio success in the US. Released as a single in Europe, "Out There" charted at number 44 in the UK. The song has since been praised by critics as a highlight of Where You Been.

== Background and music ==
"Out There" is one of the more aggressive rock songs from Where You Been, contrasting with softer songs like "Start Choppin" and "Goin Home". "Out There" features a guitar solo that has been singled out by Ned Raggett of AllMusic as "classic Dinosaur Jr." The song also features chimes, which Ultimate Classic Rock noted as an example of the band "adding to [its] sonic palette."

When asked about the best riffs he has written, Mascis named "Out There" alongside "Sludgefest." He explained, "I like 'Sludgefest' and 'Out There.' 'Out There' being more of what you'd consider a riff. It seems a bit complicated for me to play and sing, so I'm impressed. It seems a bit over my ability."

== Release ==
In addition to being released on Where You Been, "Out There" was also released as a single through Blanco y Negro in the UK and Europe. This was released via multiple CD formats as well as a cassette and a limited-edition 10-inch single. All of the standard releases featured "Keeblin'" and a live version of ,"Kracked" whilst, depending on the release, other versions included live versions of either "The Post" or "Quest" or radio session tracks "Get Me" "Severed Lips" and "Thumb".

The song peaked at number 44 in the UK over a two-week stay on the charts.

The song was also released as a promotional single in the US.

"Out There" was a moderate alternative radio hit upon its release, aided by a music video featuring the band performing in the snow. The song was later included on the soundtrack for Wayne's World 2.

Dinosaur Jr. performed the song live on Late Night with David Letterman in 1993.

== Reception ==
"Out There" has seen positive reception from music critics and has often been singled out as a highlight of Where You Been. Ned Raggett of AllMusic described the song as "one of the most mournful things Mascis has recorded, with an especially yearning chorus" and praised the guitar solo as "fiery." Josh Gray of Clash described Where You Been's "opening salvo of 'Out There' and 'Start Choppin'" as "better than sex, drugs and peanut butter (individually or all at once, it doesn't matter)." Timothy and Elizabeth Bracy of Stereogum named the song one of the "great tunes" from Where You Been, while Stevie Chick of the BBC said the song "opened the album with enough overdriven squalling and riffing to excite the teens in the Pearl Jam t-shirts." Nick Soulsby of PopMatters praised the song's "barnstorming intro."
