= Sculptor (album) =

Studio album by Luluc
- Released: 13 July 2018
- Studios: Knight's Corner Studio, Brooklyn, New York; Long Pond Studio, Hudson Valley, New York
- Genre: Indie folk
- Length: 35:06
- Label: Sub Pop
- Producers: Steve Hassett; Zoë Randell

Luluc chronology
Passerby (2014)	Sculptor (2018)

Sculptor is the third studio album by Australian indie folk band Luluc. It was released on 13 July 2018, under Sub Pop.

== Critical reception ==
Professional ratings
Aggregate scores
Source	Rating
AnyDecentMusic?	7.4/10
Metacritic	78/100
Review scores
Source	Rating
AllMusic	4/5 stars
The Line of Best Fit	8/10
Paste	6.9/10
Pitchfork	4.6/10

Sculptor was met with "generally favourable" reviews from critics. At Metacritic, which assigns a weighted average rating out of 100 to reviews from mainstream publications, this release received an average score of 78, based on 11 reviews.

== Track listing ==
Sculptor track listing
No.	Title	Length
1.	"Spring"	3:01
2.	"Heist"	4:13
3.	"Kids"	4:33
4.	"Controversy"	2:20
5.	"Cambridge"	5:12
6.	"Me and Jasper"	3:22
7.	"Genius"	3:19
8.	"Moon Girl"	3:05
9.	"Needn't Be"	1:55
10.	"Sculptor"	4:06

== Personnel ==
Musicians

- Steve Hassett – vocals, guitar, drums, producer
- Zoë Randell – guitar, producer
- Matthew Eccles – drums
- J Mascis – guitar
- Jim White – drums
- Dave Nelson – trumpet
- Aaron Dessner – guitar

Production

- Jonathan Low – engineer
- Charlotte De Mezamat – photography
