= Headbanger (disambiguation) =

Headbanger is a slang term for a fan of heavy metal music.

Headbanger or Headbangers may also refer to:

== Music ==
- "Headbangeeeeerrrrr!!!!!", a 2012 Japanese language song by Babymetal
- "Head Banger" (EPMD song), a 1993 song by EPMD
- "Headbanger", a 1992 song and single by Gobblehoof
- "Headbanger", a 1996 song by Pansy Division
- "Headbanger", a 2002 composition by Matthew Hindson

== Other uses ==
- The Headbangers, a professional wrestling tag team consisting of Mosh (Chaz) and Thrasher Glen Ruth
- Headbanger, a 1996 crime novel by Hugo Hamilton (writer)
- Head Banger, the dwarfish name of Ankh-Morpork City Watch's captain Carrot Ironfoundersson in Terry Pratchett's Discworld
