= Outpatients (band) =

American hardcore band

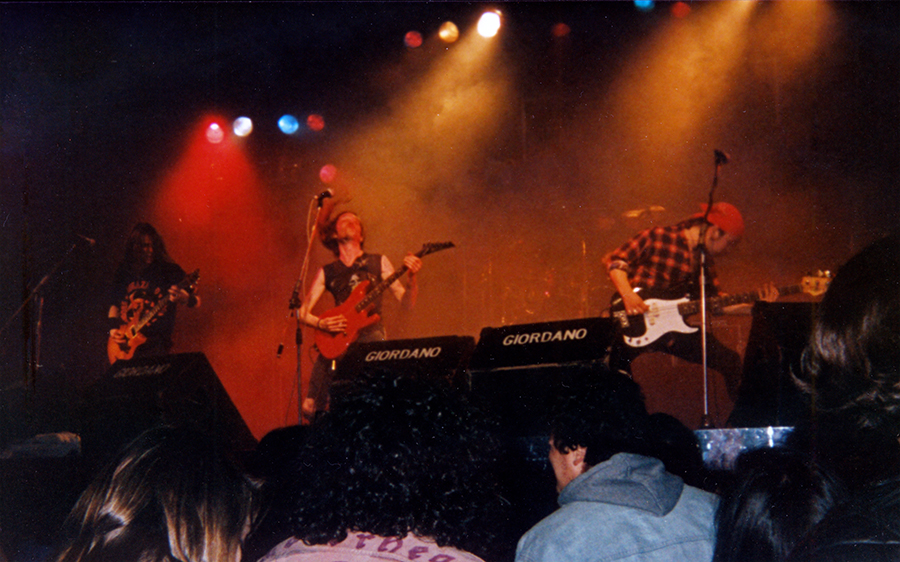
- Outpatients performing at Halley in Buenos Aires, Argentina 1992. Left to right: Marc Lichtenstein, Vis Helland, and Scott Helland

Background information
- Origin: Westfield, Massachusetts
- Genres: Alternative metal, hardcore punk, thrash metal, progressive metal
- Years active: 1982–1995
- Labels: Free Association, Exotic Aquatic, Incas
- Past members: Vis Helland, Scott Helland, Mike Kingsbury, Scot Bates, Marc Lichtenstein, Mike Smith
- Website: www.outpatientsband.com

Outpatients was an American hardcore/metal band formed in Westfield, Massachusetts in 1982 by brothers Vis Helland and Scott Helland with drummer Mike Kingsbury. Outpatients were known for their highly energetic live stage shows.

== Western Mass years (1982–1988) ==
The group formed from the remnants of Vis’ first group, Mace, formed in 1980. When Mace’s bassist left for the U.S. Navy in late 1982, he was quickly replaced by Vis' 14-year-old brother, Scott (who’d formed the hardcore group Deep Wound in 1982 with Lou Barlow and J Mascis). The band’s name was changed to Outpatients. They quickly made waves in the hardcore scene, gaining rave reviews almost immediately. In February 1983, they released The Basement Tape, which circulated in the underground worldwide, and made Maximumrocknroll's Top 20. In 1983 they also made the first of many New York City appearances at CBGB. They appeared on several compilations, including Bands That Could Be God. This included tracks from their first studio recording, which was done with punk producer Lou Giordano and Jimmy Dufour at Radio Beat Studios in Boston. Outpatients toured with Battalion of Saints in 1984. Musically, lyrically and ideologically, Outpatients never fully committed to the hardcore punk genre, opting to allow themselves to progress musically. The band felt that hardcore was becoming too restrictive in general, despite its non-conformist themes. Scott was among the bassists in the area who incorporated slap bass into hardcore and metal, and by 1985 the band’s sound had crossed over from hardcore to an eclectic form of heavy metal. In 1987 Mike Kingsbury left and was replaced by Scot Bates. In 1988 the band released Free Association, its first full-length album on vinyl.

== NYC years (1989–1995) ==
In 1988 Scot Bates announced that he was leaving the group. That summer NYC friends School of Violence, who were signed to Death Records, a sublabel of Metal Blade, lost their bass player. Vis and Scott relocated to New York and teamed up with the remaining SOV members to complete their lineup. SOV broke up in 1990, and Outpatients reformed that same year. Mike Kingsbury moved to New York to play drums a second time but was replaced again by Scot Bates. In 1991 they released the demo “Life On The Outside” and hired Marc Lichtenstein as a second guitarist. In 1992, they toured in South America. Scot Bates left the group at the end of that year. In early 1993, the band released their Test of Time CD, recorded at Don Fury Studios in Manhattan. Subsequently, Mike Smith was hired on drums until the band's breakup in 1995.

Outpatients performed a single reunion show with Mike Smith on drums in New York City in 1996.

== Discography ==
=== Albums ===
- 1983 Outpatients: Basement Tape, Free Association Records
- 1985 Outpatients: Committed, Free Association Records
- 1986 Outpatients: Second Thought, Free Association Records
- 1988 Outpatients: Free Association, Free Association/Incas Records
- 1989 Outpatients: Two Song Free Demo, Free Association Records
- 1990 Outpatients: Unreported Outbreaks, Free Association Records
- 1990 Outpatients: Committed Two, Free Association Records
- 1990 Outpatients: Battle of the Giants split 7-inch w/ Black Market Baby
- 1991 Outpatients: Life on the Outside, Free Association Records
- 1993 Outpatients: Test of Time, Free Association Records
- 1995 Outpatients: Hardcore Outcasts Revisited 1982-1984, Free Association Records
- 1998 Outpatients: Outcasts II 1985-1995, Free Association Records
- 2001 Outpatients: Outpatients vs Dastupids split Lp, Rave Up Records (Italy)

=== Compilation albums ===
- 1983 Birth Defect Tape
- 1984 Empty Skulls tape comp Skull Tapes
- 1984 Bands that could be God LP Homestead Records (includes Deep Wound)
- 1985 Flipside Volume 2 Vinyl fanzine Gasatanka Records
- 1998 Suburban Voice 15th Anniversary CD Suburban Voice Records
- 2002 Shielded by Death Vol.2 Western MA Punk`79-`83 CD Dionysus Records

== Members ==
Original line-up:

- Vis Helland - Guitar, Vocals
- Scott Helland - Bass, B. Vox
- Mike Kingsbury - Drums, B. Vox

Outpatients also included:

- Scot Bates - Drums 1987-1988, 1990-1993
- Marc Lichtenstein - Guitar 1990-1993
- Mike Smith - Drums 1993-1995
