= Free So Free =

Studio album by J Mascis + The Fog
- Released: October 8, 2002
- Genre: Alternative rock, lo-fi
- Length: 43:22
- Label: Ultimatum (North America); City Slang (Europe); Pony Canyon (Japan)
- Producer: J Mascis

J Mascis + The Fog chronology
More Light (2000)	Free So Free (2002)

Free So Free is the second studio album by alternative rock band J Mascis + The Fog. It was released in 2002. The album was recorded and mixed at "Bob's Place", Mascis's home studio in his native Amherst, Massachusetts.

== Reception ==
Professional ratings
Aggregate scores
Source	Rating
Metacritic	72/100
Review scores
Source	Rating
Pitchfork	5.6/10

Free So Free received mixed to positive reviews from critics. On Metacritic, the album holds a score of 72/100 based on 12 reviews, indicating "generally favorable reviews".

== Track listing ==
All songs written by J Mascis.

No.	Title	Length
1.	"Freedom"	4:19
2.	"If That's How It's Gotta Be"	3:31
3.	"Set Us Free"	4:47
4.	"Bobbin"	4:32
5.	"Free So Free"	5:59
6.	"Tell the Truth"	4:28
7.	"Someone Said"	4:02
8.	"Everybody Lets Me Down"	3:15
9.	"Say the Word"	4:45
10.	"Outside"	3:44
Total length:		43:22

Japanese Edition Bonus Tracks
No.	Title	Length
11.	"No Way"	3:39
12.	"Alone (live)"	15:06

== Personnel ==
- J Mascis – vocals, electric and acoustic guitars, bass guitar, drums, mellotron
- Tony Jarvis – wurly (Tracks 2, 5)
- Don Depew – slide guitar (Tracks 2, 5), engineering
- Mark Klein – percussion (Track 7)
- John Petkovich – vocals (Tracks 3, 4, 6)

Technical

- Mark Allen Miller, Steve Revitte, Thom Monahan – engineering
- John Agnello – mixing
