= What Do We Do Now =

Studio album by J Mascis
- Released: February 2, 2024
- Length: 44:35
- Label: Sub Pop
- Producer: J Mascis

J Mascis chronology
Elastic Days (2018)	What Do We Do Now (2024)

What Do We Do Now is the fourth solo studio album by Dinosaur Jr. frontman J Mascis, released through Sub Pop on February 2, 2024. It received acclaim from critics.

== Critical reception ==
Professional ratings
Aggregate scores
Source	Rating
Metacritic	74/100
Review scores
Source	Rating
AllMusic	4/5 stars
The Line of Best Fit	6/10
Pitchfork	6.4/10
Mojo	4/5 stars
Uncut	8/10

What Do We Do Now received a score of 74 out of 100 on review aggregator Metacritic based on 15 critics' reviews, indicating "generally favorable" reception. Mojo called it "an LP of insight and empathy", while Uncut felt that "the result is Mascis's most fully formed and direct solo set to date". Fred Thomas of AllMusic called it "a little different" from Mascis's output with Dinosaur Jr., as "here the drums are blasting away at full force, the tempos are lively, and heavily distorted guitar solos beam in from outer space in a way Mascis has made his own since the days of Bug".

The Quietus' Robert Barry remarked that while the "kind of wild scree that once characterised Dinosaur Jr records is largely gone now", he still found the album to be "a record of beautifully put-together songs played on an acoustic guitar then beefed up by a band". Greg Hyde of The Line of Best Fit wrote that What Do We Do Now "has some interesting moments on its first side, but quite a bit of it does feel leaden and lacking in energy".

Evan Rytlewski of Pitchfork stated that if the album is "less satisfying than Mascis' previous solo releases, it's because it has less to reveal. Mascis has written so many songs about the same needs and frustrations—his failures to communicate, to be understood, and ultimately accepted—that they can't help but bleed together".

== Track listing ==
All tracks are written by J Mascis.

What Do We Do Now track listing
No.	Title	Length
1.	"Can't Believe We're Here"	3:58
2.	"What Do We Do Now"	5:00
3.	"Right Behind You"	4:20
4.	"You Don't Understand Me"	3:50
5.	"I Can't Find You"	4:24
6.	"Old Friends"	4:13
7.	"It's True"	5:16
8.	"Set Me Down"	3:53
9.	"Hangin Out"	4:53
10.	"End Is Gettin Shaky"	4:48
Total length:		44:35

== Personnel ==
Musicians

- J Mascis – vocals, guitars, bass, drums
- Matthew "Doc" Dunn – pedal steel
- Ken Maiuri – piano, keyboards

Production

- J Mascis – production, engineering
- Greg Calbi – mastering
- John Agnello – mixing
- Justin Pizzoferrato – engineering
- Mark Miller – engineering

Creative

- Neil Blender – artwork
- Sasha Barr – layout

== Charts ==
Chart performance for What Do We Do Now
Chart (2024)	Peak position
German Albums (Offizielle Top 100)	37
Scottish Albums (OCC)	6
UK Album Downloads (OCC)	31
UK Independent Albums (OCC)	6
