= Vaganza =

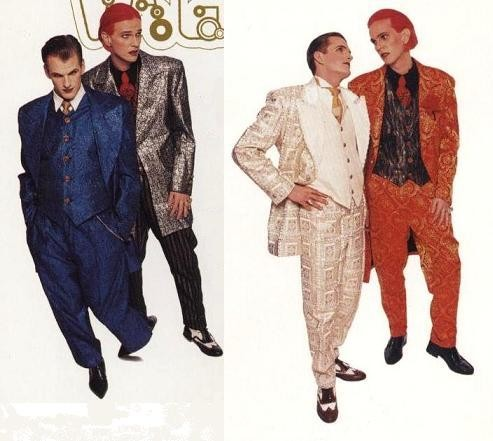
- David Longworth Wallingford on the left, Quigley on the right

Background information
- Genres: Glam rock, art rock, pop rock, progressive rock
- Years active: 1991–1998
- Labels: Geffen Records, Outpost Recordings, Elektra Records
- Past members: Quigley; David Longworth Wallingford

Vaganza was a theatrical art-rock-pop duo consisting of multi-instrumentalists David Longworth Wallingford and Quigley.

== Astronaut, Skunk, and Vaganza's origins ==
Wallingford and Quigley began formally working on the Vaganza project in late 1991. The duo's launch followed the dissolution of their respective indie groups, Astronaut and Skunk.

The pair went into seclusion for roughly two years, completely reinventing themselves visually, and developing their sound—a significant departure, both in style and complexity, from their previous ventures—in a New Jersey–based home studio.

Speaking with Yahoo Music Editor-in-Chief Lyndsey Parker in a 1998 interview, Quigley said of the project's inception:

"... we grew up listening to all forms of musical theater and all that glam-rock crap. David and I used to always talk about our 'dream band,' what we'd really like to do with music. Finally we thought, 'Maybe we shouldn't just dream about this, or talk about this as if it's something that will never actually happen, and we should actually do it.'"

== Are You Willing to Die for Rock 'n' Roll? demo (1993) and signing with Elektra Records ==
Their first unofficial release was a 1993 demo entitled Are You Willing to Die for Rock 'n' Roll?

The elaborately produced recording was completed in October of '93. During the previous spring and summer, Wallingford and Quigley had fully realized their desired individual and combined visual presentation(s). In the months following Are You Willing's recording, the two repeatedly made the rounds, through Manhattan's nightclubs, and various music- and/or nightlife-oriented events. These social activities were undertaken with the goal of being seen and circulating the demo to as many people as possible. Among those who ultimately received copies were many of the pair's friends in the music business.

In Rolling Stone magazine's year-end survey of popular musicians, Billy Corgan of The Smashing Pumpkins named Are You Willing to Die for Rock 'n' Roll? (which he erroneously listed as Are You Ready to Die for Rock 'n' Roll?) as one of his 10 favorite releases of 1993.

The impact of these combined efforts proved to be sufficient substitute for Vaganza's then-lacking live band to generate an industry buzz and eventually land the pair a contract with Elektra Records.

In April 1994, Terry Tolkin, then an A&R VP for Elektra, offered them a deal.

== Recording and release of self-titled debut album (1995–1998) ==
In January 1996, the pair embarked upon the recording of what was intended to be their debut for Elektra.

The album was co-produced by Vaganza and the recording's engineer, Greg Frey (whose credits included work with Ween, Richard Auguste Morse, and Quigley's old band, Skunk). Numerous musicians, including dozens of string and horn players, and two separate choirs, were hired for the sessions. The most notable of these contributors was the album's drummer, Joey Waronker (Atoms for Peace, Beck, Roger Waters).

The initial sessions wrapped in September 1996, just as Tolkin and Elektra were parting ways. Tolkin was the rather costly album's only real champion at the label, so the pair began to quietly investigate their options.

Former artist manager Andy Gershon (Cocteau Twins, Bryan Ferry) had that same year—along with record producer Scott Litt and A&R vet Mark Williams—launched an imprint through Geffen Records, called Outpost Recordings. Gershon, being a friend of the pair and vocal admirer of the project, offered them a deal without hesitation.

Outpost purchased the album from Elektra, finally releasing it in April 1998.

While a mix of the album had been completed by Frey, in 1996, the final mix was done by engineer and producer Jim Rondinelli (whose credits included work with Matthew Sweet, The Jayhawks, and Wilco), during August and September 1997.

== Live performances and break-up (1998) ==
The album went largely unnoticed upon release, with the small reception that greeted it being mixed to favorable.

During the summer of 1998 the pair assembled a 10-piece live band featuring such well-regarded players as saxophonist Baron Raymonde, drummer Zach Danziger, and John Kimbrough of the rock band Walt Mink.

The ensemble performed a number of shows in the New York City area, to strong attendance and generally favorable, regular write-ups in the city's various arts weeklies (such as Village Voice, New York Press, and Time Out New York, the last of whose kind words were surprising, as they had earlier published a memorably scathing review of the album).

Regarding their live performances, Lyndsey Parker wrote (from the above-referenced 1998 interview):

"... the onstage Vaganza experience is a decidedly bigger extra-vaganza. Eight additional players—all in 'special costume,' of course—are employed to make Vaganza's live sound 'equivalently huge' to that of their album. Quigley even proudly declares that the live Vaganza is superior to the studio Vaganza. 'The biggest criticism I have of our record is it's a bit overworked and overwrought,' he says frankly. 'I think some people have trouble connecting with it because there's a certain lack of humanity, a certain alienating tone to it. That was not entirely accidental, but live it's all about humanity; in fact, we have 10 humanities onstage! I think the live show is easier to get.'"

During the autumn of '98, the group was dropped by Outpost (the imprint itself folded in late '99).

For reasons never publicly disclosed, Quigley and Wallingford dissolved their partnership in December of '98.
