= Scott Helland =

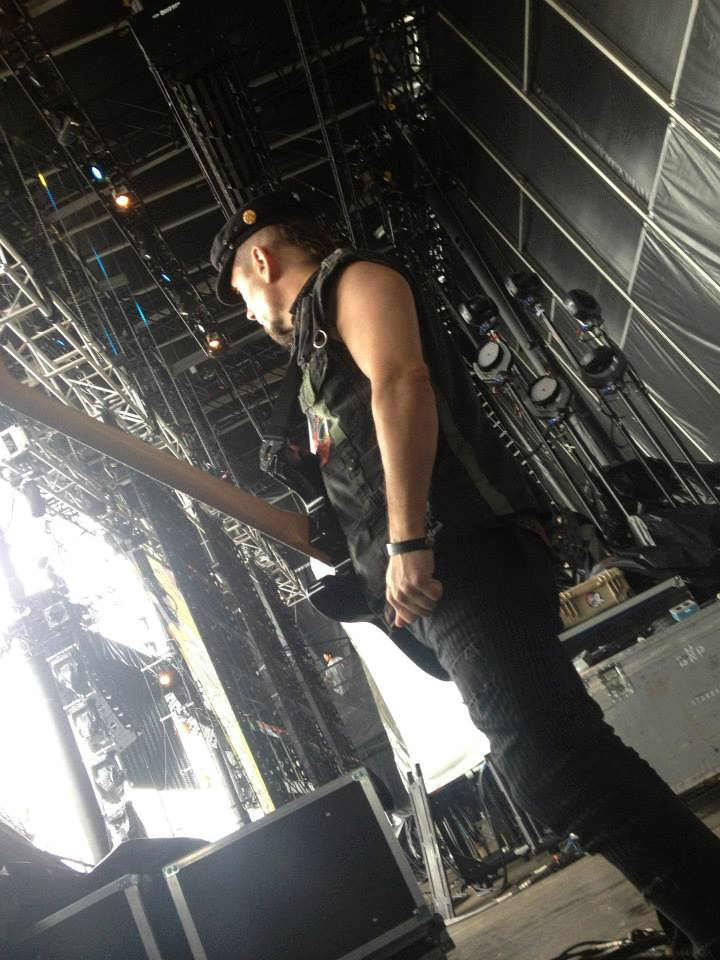
- Helland performing with Deep Wound in 2013

Background information
- Born: Scott Donald Helland; Centralia, Illinois, United States
- Genres: Alternative rock, folk punk, punk cabaret, Instrumental, hardcore punk, thrash metal, new-age, post-punk, Surf Rock
- Occupations: Musician, songwriter
- Instruments: guitar, bass, drums, Vocals
- Years active: 1982–present
- Website: www.frenchyandthepunk.com

Scott Helland is an American alternative rock musician, acoustic guitarist, bassist and songwriter. A founding member of the groups Deep Wound, Outpatients, and Frenchy and the Punk. He also performs instrumental music as Guitarmy of One. Helland was born in Centralia, Illinois and raised in Westfield, Massachusetts.

== Career ==
Helland attended high school in Westfield, where he met Lou Barlow. The two formed the Massachusetts-based hardcore punk band Deep Wound in 1982. J Mascis joined the band after answering their ad for a "drummer wanted to play really fast". While playing bass guitar in Deep Wound, Helland formed Outpatients with brother Vis Helland in 1982 and released The Basement Tape in 1983. The Outpatients were also part of the Western Mass hardcore scene and shared the stage with bands like Hüsker Dü, Battalion of Saints, Crucifix, The FU's and GBH. Deep Wound broke up in 1984 and "Scott... went in the Outpatients full time." The Outpatients toured the East Coast of the US, Canada and Argentina throughout their 13-year career and disbanded in 1995.

Helland released seven albums under his own name beginning with the experimental Hellbox Mood Rings CD in 1996. In 2000, he released an ambient/instrumental/new age CD called Space Age Tranceology "and made the striking transition to atmospheric soundtracks." In the same year he composed music for the film Riders. Songs from his 2002 CD release, Earthbound, were played on the syndicated radio program Echoes. In 2006, he released the all acoustic 12 song Catapult album with his tribute to the BBC series of the same name Monarch of the Glen. He formed Scott Helland and the Traveling Band of Gypsy Nomads in 2005 with French-born singer and percussionist Samantha Stephenson, which later became Frenchy and the Punk.

In 2004, Helland reunited with his old Deep Wound bandmates for a song at the John M Greene Hall in Northampton, Massachusetts. In June 2013 they reunited, to perform the song "Training Ground" at the Governor's Ball in New York City. More recently Helland and his bandmates played together in 2018 at Fenway Park in Boston, Massachusetts when the other half of Deep Wound, J Mascis and Lou Barlow's band Dinosaur Jr. were opening for the Foo Fighters.

In 2014 his duo Frenchy and the Punk performed at Scotland's prestigious Edinburgh Fringe Fest. In 2016 he released a book of his pen and ink drawings titled Feast. "Helland’s pagan-organic lines recall the gothic style of Aubrey Beardsley, as well as those of punk pen wielders like Savage Pencil, Nick Blinko, and Raymond Pettibon."

Helland returned to the instrumental rock world with his Never End the Rocket Century record in 2017. Intended as a multicultural mashup of the classic Ramones albums Rocket to Russia and End of the Century, his acoustic (guitar) has the propulsive drive of punk rock, but his riffs resonate with sounds ranging from Krautrock to flamenco and spaghetti western pastiche. Helland has released 6 videos from the album including the title track, 'Never End the Rocket Century', in which he donned a space suit and walked around Los Angeles.

In January 2019 Helland and Stephenson's cabaret rock duo Frenchy and the Punk released a video for the song Lanky Bell Bottoms from their forth-coming album Hooray Beret.

Helland released the all instrumental spy themed album 'The Spy Detective Collective' in 2021. The music journalist Justin Vellucci from Pop Matters says "Helland has tapped into something interesting and, dare we say magical on The Spy Detective Collective."

== Discography ==
See also Deep Wound

=== Albums ===
Year	Title	Name	Label
1982	American Style(demo)	Deep Wound	Self Released
1983	The Basement Tape	Outpatients	Free Association
1983	Deep Wound(7")	Deep Wound	Radiobeat Records
1985	Committed	Outpatients	Free Association
1987	Free Association	Outpatients	Incas Records
1989	Insomnia	School of Violence	Self
1991	Life on the Outside	Outpatients	EA Recordings
1993	Test of Time	Outpatients	EA Recordings
1995	Hardcore Outcast's '82-'84	Outpatients	EA Recordings
1996	Hellbox Mood Rings	Scott Helland	Exotic Aquatic Recordings
1997	Anthology Compilation	Deep Wound	Damaged Goods
1998	Outcasts II '85-'95	Outpatients	EA Recordings
1998	Ambitions Make Way for Dread	Darkside NYC	indie release
1998	Deep in It	Scott Helland	Hellectrifly Records
1999	Motion Sickness	Scott Helland	Exotic Aquatic Recordings
2000	Space Age Tranceology	Scott Helland	Exotic Aquatic Recordings
2000	The Blushing Bachelor	Stephen Rand and the Magic Ponies	Wormco Records
2002	Earthbound	Scott Helland	Exotic Aquatic Recordings
2004	Brocade	Scott Helland	Exotic Aquatic Recordings
2004	Cathedral	Ware River Club	Spirit House Records
2005	In Pursuit of Your Happiness	Mark Mulcahy	Mezzotint
2006	Almost Complete	Deep Wound	Baked Goods Records
2006	Catapult	Scott Helland	Exotic Aquatic Recordings
2007	Thread & Stone	The Gypsy Nomads	Exotic Aquatic Recordings
2008	Eternal Summer	The Gypsy Nomads	Exotic Aquatic Recordings
2008	At the Carnivale Eclectique	The Gypsy Nomads	Exotic Aquatic Recordings
2010	Happy Madness	Frenchy and the Punk	EA Recordings
2011	Live at Bube's Brewery	Frenchy and the Punk	EA Recordings
2012	Hey Hey Cabaret	Frenchy and the Punk	EA Recordings
2013	Elephant Uproar	Frenchy and the Punk	EA Recordings
2014	Cartwheels EP	Frenchy and the Punk	EA Recordings
2014	Bonjour Batfrog	Frenchy and the Punk	EA Recordings
2015	Feast Art Book	Scott Helland	Paris Punk Press
2016	Compilation	Scott Helland Guitarmy of One	EA Recordings
2016	Batfrog Tracks - Lyric/Photo Book	Frenchy and the Punk	Paris Punk Press
2017	Never End the Rocket Century	Scott Helland Guitarmy of One	EA Recordings
2019	Hooray Beret	Frenchy and the Punk	EA Recordings
2019	Rock Lobster (Scott Guest Vocals)(Single)	Boom Boom Shake	Independent
2019	Chupando (Scott Guest Guitar)(Single)	Voltaire	Voltaire Recordings
2020	The Storm is a Call for Rebuilding(Single)	Frenchy and the Punk	EA Recordings
2021	The Spy Detective Collective	Guitarmy of One	EA Recordings
2021	Readmitted	Outpatients	Painkiller Records
2022	Zen Ghost	Frenchy and the Punk	EA Recordings
2023	The Wave Files	Guitarmy of One	EA Recordings
2024	Midnight Garden	Frenchy and the Punk	EA Recordings
2025	Silver Screen Spy Scene	Guitarmy of One	EA Recordings
2025	Not Under Your Spell(Single)	Frenchy and the Punk	Distortion Productions

=== Featured in compilations ===
- Bands That Could Be God LP (1984 – Deep Wound and Outpatients)
- Flipside Vinyl Fanzine Vol 2 LP (1985 – Outpatients)
- Guillotined at the Hangar: Shielded by Death, Vol. 2 (2002 – Outpatients)
