= Several Shades of Why =

Studio album by J Mascis
- Released: March 15, 2011
- Genre: Folk rock
- Length: 41:12
- Label: Sub Pop
- Producer: J Mascis

J Mascis chronology
J Mascis Live at CBGB's (2006)	Several Shades of Why (2011)	Tied to a Star (2014)

Professional ratings
Review scores
Source	Rating
AllMusic	4/5 stars
American Songwriter	4/5 stars
The A.V. Club	(B−)
Filter	(87/100)
NME	(6/10)
Now	4/5 stars
Paste Magazine	(8.2/10)
Pitchfork	(7.9/10)
PopMatters	(7/10)
Spin	(7/10)

Several Shades of Why is the debut solo studio album by American musician J Mascis, best known as the frontman of the group Dinosaur Jr. The album was released March 15, 2011 on Sub Pop Records.

== Track listing ==
All tracks are written by J Mascis (unless stated).

No.	Title	Length
1.	"Listen to Me"	3:10
2.	"Several Shades of Why"	4:55
3.	"Not Enough"	3:14
4.	"Very Nervous and Love"	4:46
5.	"Is It Done"	4:50
6.	"Make It Right"	3:46
7.	"Where Are You"	4:00
8.	"Too Deep"	2:30
9.	"Can I"	5:25
10.	"What Happened"	4:36
Total length:		41:12

=== Bonus tracks ===
Japanese bonus tracks
No.	Title	Writer(s)	Length
11.	"I Been Thinking"		3:38
12.	"Circle"	Edie Brickell, Kenny Withrow	3:39

== Personnel ==
- J Mascis – vocals, guitar
- Kurt Vile – vocals, dobro, guitar, optigan, piano, saw, slide guitar
- Pall Jenkins – vocals, lap steel, optigan, piano, saw
- Kevin Drew – vocals, clarinet
- Ben Bridwell – vocal
- Suzanne Thorpe – flute
- Sophie Trudeau – violin
- Kurt Fedora – guitar
- Matt Valentine – guitar
