= Where You Been =

Studio album by Dinosaur Jr.
- Released: February 9, 1993
- Recorded: 1992
- Genre: Alternative rock; indie rock
- Length: 47:38
- Label: Blanco y Negro/Sire
- Producer: J Mascis

Dinosaur Jr. chronology
Fossils (1991)	Where You Been (1993)	Without a Sound (1994)

Singles from Where You Been
- 1. "Get Me" Released: 1992; 2. "Start Choppin" Released: 1993; 3. "Out There" Released: 1993

Where You Been is the fifth studio album by Dinosaur Jr., released on February 9, 1993.

The song "Start Choppin'" was their biggest hit, reaching number 3 on the Modern Rock Tracks chart in the U.S., and the Top 20 of the UK Singles Chart. This was drummer Murph's last recording with J Mascis until 2007's Beyond.

This was the only Dinosaur Jr. album between 1988's Bug and 2007's Beyond to be recorded entirely with a full band. During Dinosaur Jr.'s major label years, Mascis performed most of the instruments himself on record.

The album peaked with 263,000 units sold in the US.

== Background ==
Where You Been was the first album recorded by Dinosaur Jr.'s new line-up, after the largely J Mascis-recorded Green Mind. This line-up consisted of Mascis, long-time drummer Murph, and new bassist Mike Johnson. Mascis explained on an interview with 120 Minutes, "It's the first time we've felt like a band for maybe six years, or something. [Johnson] adds a lot, just having someone that I can get along with musically and personally. It just makes the record better having all the people there contributing something, rather than the last one."

Where You Been was Dinosaur Jr.'s greatest commercial success up to that point, reaching number 50 in the US and number 10 in the UK. Mascis reacted at the time, "We're just making records and, I mean, every one sold more than the last one. Whatever happens, we'll deal with it then."

In a later interview, drummer Murph recalled the album positively, saying "Out of the records I played on, I think of Where You Been very fondly." Hüsker Dü frontman Bob Mould spoke positively of the album, commenting, "I've heard Where You Been, their new album. It's brilliant, amazing — it's even got strings. They've stopped sounding the way they did on Bug, but they've built on the same basic premise and kept those very recognisable guitar sounds. I don't know if they make a conscious effort to change, but I suppose they'd be really bored by now if they always sounded the same."

== Reception ==
Professional ratings
Review scores
Source	Rating
AllMusic	4/5 stars
Chicago Tribune	3.5/4 stars
Entertainment Weekly	B+
Los Angeles Times	3.5/4 stars
Mojo	4/5 stars
Pitchfork	7.8/10
Q	4/5 stars
Rolling Stone	4/5 stars
Select	4/5
Uncut	9/10

The album was released to positive reviews. AllMusic's Ned Raggett called the album "occasionally moody and dark but otherwise [...] more rough fun. [...] [I]t's a puréed blast of punk, classic rock, and more. It may be business as usual, but it's good business just the same, whether it's the gentle "Not the Same," on which Mascis does his best Neil Young impersonation, or the stuttering feedback snorts and rips on "Hide," on which he borrows a bit back from disciple Kevin Shields." The tracks "Out There", "Start Choppin", "Get Me" and "Goin Home" were chosen as highlights. Michael Azerrad, writing for Rolling Stone, was similarly positive, writing that "their second major-label album [...] recall the shambling lope of Crazy Horse-era Young, as well as hints of minor Seventies icons from Blue Oyster Cult to Humble Pie. The majestic “Get Me” is “Layla” for the distressed-denim set (even the guitar squiggle at the end is pinched from Clapton’s “Let It Rain”)." He singled out the "riff-happy" songs "Start Choppin" and "I Ain't Sayin" as "excellent" (calling the latter "a two-minute gem") and praised Mascis' production choices ("he embellishes the band’s usual all-guitar palette with timpani, chimes and strings") as "a daring move in the sadly conformist world of alternative rock". "Like many of its peers," he concludes, "Dinosaur Jr is a musical cargo cult, turning the detritus of another culture into something that can be used — and maybe even worshiped. For one of the crowning glories of slacker culture, look no further." Greg Kot wrote that what made the album "compelling is Mascis' growth as a songwriter and, apparently, as a person. On previous albums, the singer's relationship with the world outside seemed about as emotionally developed as a 13-year-old's. But on "Where You Been" his wan, dissipated voice conveys a deeper commitment and yearning. [...] All the while, Mascis' army of guitars is placed in service of his breaking heart, and the sound is majestic and moving."

Robert Christgau was less positive, finding that "somehow his axe and his voice sing the same tune, momentarily transmuting his self-pity into simple sadness". He singled out the first two tracks as highlights and gave the album a two-star honorable mention in his '90s Consumer Guide book.

=== Legacy ===
Prefix magazine's Matthew Flander described it as "a classic record from the band, capturing just about every great ’90s song they had aside from “The Wagon” and “Feel the Pain”." He also called the album a possible "one-up" from Mascis to Sebadoh's Bubble & Scrape, writing: "if that was his goal, you can see [...] how he might have tried to beat Barlow at his own game. And maybe there was no clear winner between the two, but we sure lucked out. Stevie Chick of BBC called it a "[l]aconic, guitar-heavy masterpiece from Dinosaur Jr.’s second-wind." "There was something unabashedly classic about Where You Been’s rock," she writes, "deriving not least from Mascis’s copious guitar heroics, layering multiple tracks of scree and howl so the entire album feels like one epic, sky-scraping solo. [...] With his fondness for extended guitar-play, his country-soaked rock crunch, his cracked and sweet vocals, Where You Been identified Mascis as hewn from the same stone as Neil Young before him." The A.V. Club's Noel Murray wrote that "Dinosaur Jr. wasn’t the most unlikely band to make the jump to a major label in the ’90s (the post-Nirvana era was a weird time), but few could’ve guessed that Mascis’ group would actually sell a respectable amount of records, without substantially altering its style. [...] Barlow-less Dinosaur Jr. came off a little less indie and a little more bombastic; yet the songs were still offbeat, personal, and far from radio-friendly." He wrote that the song "I Ain't Sayin", with "its canyon-filling bookending riff to its appealing shuffle and its heartwarming “rolling home to you” chorus [...] is a crowd-pleaser that could’ve been Dinosaur Jr.’s biggest hit if it’d been pushed a little harder—or at all." Cam Lindsay of Exclaim! called it a "slower, slightly superior (in comparison to its predecessor) grunge-era classic." She called both the releases "cornerstones" to the aforementioned movement, writing however that "unless you're jonesin' for reliving that period again, it's fair to say in today's world they're not much else." "In addition to succeeding in its bid to pluck up some post-‘Lithium' plaid-clad grunge fans," writes Josh Gray of Clash "'Where You Been?'s textbook construction of over-driven ear-worms would go on to strike chords with many later alt-90s guitar heroes. 'Goin' Home's gentle world-weariness sounds for all the world like it could be an Eels rip-off if it weren’t for the fact that E was still just a bespectacled teenager who was into birds at this point. Similarly the verbal spaghetti spilling over 'Hide' pre-dates Jeff Magnum's [sic] similar drawl on ‘In the Aeroplane Over The Sea’ by a fair few years. This album is basically a master-class for any songwriter struggling to write a single without compromising their sound." Mascis himself would go on to rank it as his 3rd best effort, saying: "We were trying really hard and it was well realized for what we wanted to do."

The Felled Trees Collective, consisting of members from Thrice, Samiam and No Motiv (also featuring appearances from Texas Is the Reason, Knapsack, Beat Union and numerous other bands), covered the album in its entirety on its 20th anniversary. The album was released on October 15, 2013, through the Siren Records webstore.

=== Accolades ===
The album received the following accolades:

Year-end accolades
Publication	Country	Accolade	Rank
Magnet	US	Albums of the Year	20
The Village Voice	US	The 1993 Pazz & Jop Critic's Poll	40
Melody Maker	UK	Melody Maker End Of Year Critic's List - 1993	7
Select	UK	Albums of the Year	28
Vox	UK	Vox Albums of 1993	4

Decade-end/other accolades
Publication	Country	Accolade	Rank
LAS Magazine	US	90 Albums of the 90s	76
Tom Moon	US	1,000 Recordings to Hear Before You Die	-
Stereogum	US	Dinosaur Jr. Albums From Worst To Best	4
Select	UK	The 100 Best Albums of the 90s	85

== Track listing ==
All tracks are written by J Mascis.

No.	Title	Length
1.	"Out There"	5:52
2.	"Start Choppin"	5:39
3.	"What Else Is New"	5:09
4.	"On the Way"	3:27
5.	"Not the Same"	6:00
6.	"Get Me"	5:50
7.	"Drawerings"	4:49
8.	"Hide"	4:11
9.	"Goin Home"	4:14
10.	"I Ain't Sayin"	2:27
Total length:		47:38

Bonus tracks
No.	Title	Length
11.	"Hide (Live - November 24, 1992 - John Peel Show, BBC Radio 1, Maida Vale 5)" (Bonus track on 2006 re-release)	3:49
12.	"Keeblin'" (Bonus track on 2006 re-release)	3:40
13.	"What Else Is New (Live - October 8, 1994 - BBC Radio, Brixton Academy)" (Bonus track on 2006 re-release)	10:02

B-Sides & Bonuses (2019 2CD Deluxe Expanded Reissue) Disc 1
No.	Title	Length
14.	"Hot Burrito #2" (Bonus track on 2019 re-release, Disc 1)
15.	"Quest (acoustic)" (Bonus track on 2019 re-release, Disc 1)
16.	"Turnip Farm" (Bonus track on 2019 re-release, Disc 1)
17.	"Forget It" (Bonus track on 2019 re-release, Disc 1)
18.	"Keeblin" (Bonus track on 2019 re-release, Disc 1)
19.	"Missing Link" (Bonus track on 2019 re-release, Disc 1. With Del Tha Funky Homosapien)

BBC Sessions & Live In St. Paul 1993 (2019 2CD Deluxe Expanded Reissue) Disc 2
No.	Title	Length
20.	"Noon at Dawn" (BBC Peel Session, Bonus track on 2019 re-release Disc 2)
21.	"Hide" (BBC Peel Session, Bonus track on 2019 re-release Disc 2)
22.	"Get Me" (BBC Peel Session, Bonus track on 2019 re-release Disc 2)
23.	"Keeblin" (BBC Peel Session, Bonus track on 2019 re-release Disc 2)
24.	"Severed Lips" (BBC Evening Session, Bonus track on 2019 re-release Disc 2)
25.	"Thumb" (BBC Evening Session, Bonus track on 2019 re-release Disc 2)
26.	"Tarpit" (Bonus track on 2019 re-release, previously unreleased. Live from St. Paul Civic Center, June 29th, 1993.)
27.	"Budge" (Bonus track on 2019 re-release, previously unreleased. Live from St. Paul Civic Center, June 29th, 1993.)
28.	"Start Choppin" (Bonus track on 2019 re-release, previously unreleased. Live from St. Paul Civic Center, June 29th, 1993.)
29.	"Drawerings" (Bonus track on 2019 re-release, previously unreleased. Live from St. Paul Civic Center, June 29th, 1993.)
30.	"Raisins" (Bonus track on 2019 re-release, previously unreleased. Live from St. Paul Civic Center, June 29th, 1993.)
31.	"Thumb" (Bonus track on 2019 re-release, previously unreleased. Live from St. Paul Civic Center, June 29th, 1993.)
32.	"Out There" (Bonus track on 2019 re-release, previously unreleased. Live from St. Paul Civic Center, June 29th, 1993.)
33.	"Sludgefeast" (Bonus track on 2019 re-release, previously unreleased. Live from St. Paul Civic Center, June 29th, 1993.)

== Personnel ==
Dinosaur Jr.

- J Mascis – organ, guitar, piano, chimes, composer, drums on track 3, lead vocals, producer, timpani
- Mike Johnson – bass, guitar, piano, backing vocals, first guitar solo on "Get Me"
- Murph – drums

Additional personnel

- Tiffany Anders – vocals on "Get Me"
- George Berz – tambourine
- Kurt Fedora – rhythm guitar
- Dave Mason – viola
- Abie Newton – cello
- Larry Packer – violin
- Rob Turner – cello

== Charts ==
Album - Billboard (North America)

Year	Chart	Position
1993	The Billboard 200	50

Singles - Billboard (North America)

Year	Single	Chart	Position
1993	"Start Choppin'"	Modern Rock Tracks	3
