= Deep Wound =

American hardcore punk band

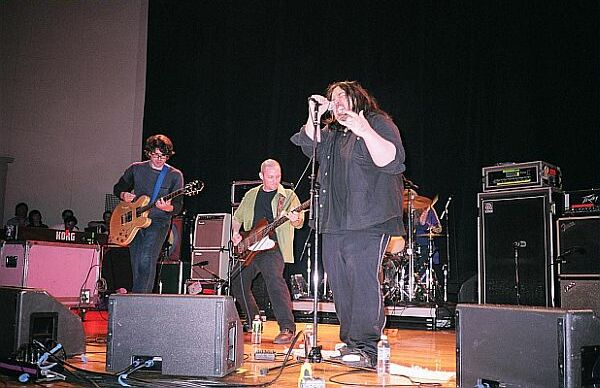
- Deep Wound performing in Northampton, Massachusetts in April 2004

Background information
- Origin: Westfield, Massachusetts, U.S.
- Genres: Hardcore punk; thrashcore
- Years active: 1982–1984; 2004; 2013
- Labels: Damaged Goods, Radiobeat
- Past members: Lou Barlow; Scott Helland; J Mascis; Charlie Nakajima

Deep Wound was an American hardcore punk band formed in 1982 in Westfield, Massachusetts. They released one self-titled 7-inch and contributed two songs to the compilation LP, Bands That Could Be God, both of which are sought after by fans and record collectors alike. The band influenced the Massachusetts hardcore scene and the development of grindcore.

== History ==
In the early 1980s, J Mascis and Deep Wound vocalist Charlie Nakajima lived in Amherst, Massachusetts, and attended the same high school. In 1982, guitarist Lou Barlow met bassist Scott Helland at the Oi! singles bin in a local record shop. Soon after, Helland posted a flier looking for musicians who were influenced by bands such as Anti-Pasti and Discharge. Mascis responded to the ad and was driven by his father to Barlow's place in Westfield to audition as the band’s drummer. Although the band already had a singer, Mascis convinced them to replace him with Nakajima, and Deep Wound's line-up was complete.

The band quickly recorded a demo cassette and began to play shows in Boston with local hardcore bands such as SSD, The F.U.'s, Jerry's Kids, etc., and often opened for hardcore punk bands playing in Western Massachusetts. Shortly thereafter, the band recorded its self-titled EP, released on Radiobeat Records, and contributed two tracks to Gerard Cosloy's Bands That Could Be God compilation LP. Studio recordings of a later session with Gerard singing have apparently been lost. As the band progressed, they began playing faster and faster, eventually developing a blur-type sound that could verge on experimental noise.

Deep Wound disbanded in 1984 with J Mascis and Lou Barlow going on to form Dinosaur Jr. Barlow later left Dinosaur Jr. and formed Sebadoh, Sentridoh, and Folk Implosion. Scott Helland formed the Outpatients, played bass in Darkside NYC and is now the guitarist for Frenchy and the Punk. Charlie Nakajima later formed GobbleHoof. J Mascis can often be seen sporting a 'Deep Wound' sweater (knitted by his mother) in Dinosaur Jr. photographs.

In April 2004, Sonic Youth played a show at John Green Hall on the Smith College campus in Northampton, Massachusetts with J Mascis and Sebadoh as the opening acts and the anticipation was that the two would reunite for a few Dinosaur Jr. songs. Unexpectedly though, after J Mascis' set, he returned to the stage on drums and Charlie Nakajima came out to address the crowd. Lou Barlow and Scott Helland soon appeared and the stunned audience witnessed a one-song Deep Wound reunion.

In 2005, British record label Damaged Goods released a Discography LP compiling the 1982 demo, self-titled 7-inch and the tracks from Bands That Could Be God.

In June 2013 Helland joined the members of Dinosaur Jr. to perform the song "Training Ground" at the Governor's Ball in New York City.

== Lineup ==
- J Mascis - drums (1982–1984, 2004, 2013)
- Lou Barlow - guitar (1982–1984, 2004, 2013)
- Scott Helland - bass (1982–1984, 2004, 2013)
- Charlie Nakajima - vocals (1982–1984, 2004)

== Discography ==
=== EPs ===
- Demo Cassette (1983, Self-released)

No.	Title	Length
1.	"I Saw It"
2.	"Sick"
3.	"Graven Image"
4.	"Lou's Anxiety Song"
5.	"Video Prick"
6.	"In My Room"
7.	"Don't Need"
8.	"Deep Wound"
9.	"Dead Babies"
10.	"You're False"
11.	"Sisters"
12.	"Patriots"
13.	"Time To Stand"
14.	"Adults In The Basement"

- Deep Wound 7-inch EP (1983, Radiobeat)

No.	Title	Length
1.	"I Saw It"	1:09
2.	"Sisters"	0:38
3.	"In My Room"	1:08
4.	"7 Don't Need"	0:58
5.	"Lou's Anxiety Song"	0:57
6.	"Video Prick"	1:33
7.	"Sick of Fun"	0:48
8.	"Deep Wound"	1:10
9.	"Dead Babies"	1:13
Total length:		9:32

=== Compilation albums ===
- Deep Wound LP (1997, Damaged Goods)

No.	Title	Length
1.	"I Saw It (from 'Deep Wound' EP)"	1:09
2.	"Sisters (from 'Deep Wound' EP)"	0:38
3.	"In My Room (from 'Deep Wound' EP)"	1:08
4.	"7 Don't Need (from 'Deep Wound' EP)"	0:58
5.	"Lou's Anxiety Song (from 'Deep Wound' EP)"	0:57
6.	"Video Prick (from 'Deep Wound' EP)"	1:33
7.	"Sick of Fun (from 'Deep Wound' EP)"	0:48
8.	"Deep Wound (from 'Deep Wound' EP)"	1:10
9.	"Dead Babies (from 'Deep Wound' EP)"	1:13
10.	"You're False"	0:39
11.	"Time to Stand"	1:40
12.	"Pressure"	1:12
13.	"Training Ground"	1:14
14.	"Deep Wound"	1:32
15.	"You're False"	0:55
16.	"You're Head Is In Your Crotch"	0:27
17.	"Psyched to Die"	2:40
18.	"Sister"	1:05
19.	"Patriots"	0:32
20.	"Never Let You In"	0:41
21.	"Adult"	0:42
22.	"Don't Need"	1:18
23.	"Video Prick"	2:11
24.	"Let's Go to the Mall"	7:16
Total length:		33:37

- Almost Complete CD (2006, Baked Goods)

No.	Title	Length
1.	"I Saw It (from 'Deep Wound' EP)"	1:09
2.	"Sisters (from 'Deep Wound' EP)"	0:38
3.	"In My Room (from 'Deep Wound' EP)"	1:08
4.	"7 Don't Need (from 'Deep Wound' EP)"	0:58
5.	"Lou's Anxiety Song (from 'Deep Wound' EP)"	0:57
6.	"Video Prick (from 'Deep Wound' EP)"	1:33
7.	"Sick of Fun (from 'Deep Wound' EP)"	0:48
8.	"Deep Wound (from 'Deep Wound' EP)"	1:10
9.	"Dead Babies (from 'Deep Wound' EP)"	1:13
10.	"You're False"	0:39
11.	"Time to Stand"	1:40
12.	"Pressure"	1:12
13.	"Training Ground"	1:14
14.	"Deep Wound"	1:32
15.	"You're False"	0:55
16.	"You're Head Is In Your Crotch"	0:27
17.	"Psyched to Die"	2:40
18.	"Sister"	1:05
19.	"Patriots"	0:32
20.	"Never Let You In"	0:41
21.	"Adult"	0:42
22.	"Don't Need"	1:18
23.	"Video Prick"	2:11
24.	"Let's Go to the Mall"	7:16
25.	"Training Ground (Practice)"	1:16
26.	"Patriots (Practice)"	0:51
27.	"You're False (Practice)"	1:04
Total length:		36:48

=== Compilation appearances ===
- Bands That Could Be God (1984, Conflict/Radiobeat) - "Time to Stand", "You're False"
