= Skunk (band) =

American rock band

- Genres: Alternative rock, post-hardcore
- Years active: 1986-1991
- Label: Twin/Tone
- Past members: Matt Sweeney; Claude Coleman, Jr. Matt Quigley; Stephan Apicella-Hitchcock; Tim Aaron
- Website: www.twintone.com/skunk.html

Skunk was an American alternative rock band formed in 1986 in Maplewood, New Jersey. During the group's existence Skunk released two albums on Twin/Tone Records; 1989's Last American Virgin and 1991's Laid.

Skunk was the first band of now respected session guitarist Matt Sweeney, who after their breakup went on to form New York City math rock quartet Chavez, and drummer Claude Coleman, Jr., best known for his decades long tenure playing with Ween. Also in the band for its entire history was bassist Matt Quigley, who later went on to form the art-pop group Vaganza.

Although they were not well known while they were active, Skunk were a favorite group of Billy Corgan of the multi-platinum 90s band Smashing Pumpkins, who in 2001 joined forces with Sweeney to form the band Zwan. In the liner notes to the Pumpkins' Pisces Iscariot LP, Corgan wrote of the song "Frail and Bedazzled"

"frail and bedazzled owes a great debt to the band skunk, from whom i ripped part of this song off. skunk was probably the greatest band that i ever knew/saw that is virtually unknown-even less than the frogs. frogs. skunk. i miss skunk."

== Discography ==
Last American Virgin (1989)

Laid (1991)
