= Tied to a Star =

Studio album by J Mascis
- Released: August 24, 2014
- Length: 40:39
- Label: Sub Pop
- Producer: J Mascis

J Mascis chronology
Several Shades of Why (2011)	Tied to a Star (2014)	Elastic Days (2018)

Professional ratings
Aggregate scores
Source	Rating
Metacritic	77/100
Review scores
Source	Rating
AllMusic	4/5 stars
NME	8/10
Pitchfork	6.4/10
Paste	8.1/10
The Line of Best Fit	7.5/10
Under the Radar	7/10

Tied to a Star is the second solo studio album by Dinosaur Jr. frontman J Mascis. It was released on August 24, 2014, under Sub Pop Records.

Funny Or Die produced an official music video for the track "Every Morning", featuring comic actor/ musician Fred Armisen. The track "Wide Awake" features guest vocals from Cat Power.

== Track listing ==
All tracks are written by J Mascis.

No.	Title	Length
1.	"Me Again"	4:24
2.	"Every Morning"	3:58
3.	"Heal the Star"	4:34
4.	"Wide Awake"	3:30
5.	"Stumble"	3:30
6.	"And Then"	4:14
7.	"Drifter"	2:46
8.	"Trailing Off"	4:20
9.	"Come Down"	5:33
10.	"Better Plane"	3:50
Total length:		40:39

== Personnel ==
- J Mascis - vocals, guitar, bass, keyboards, drums
- Ken Maiuri - piano on tracks 1, 4, 6, 8, 10
- Pall Jenkins - guitar on tracks 1, 4, vocals on tracks 2, 8
- Mark Mulcahy - vocals on tracks 2, 6
- Chan Marshall - vocals on track 4
