= J Mascis + The Fog =

American rock band

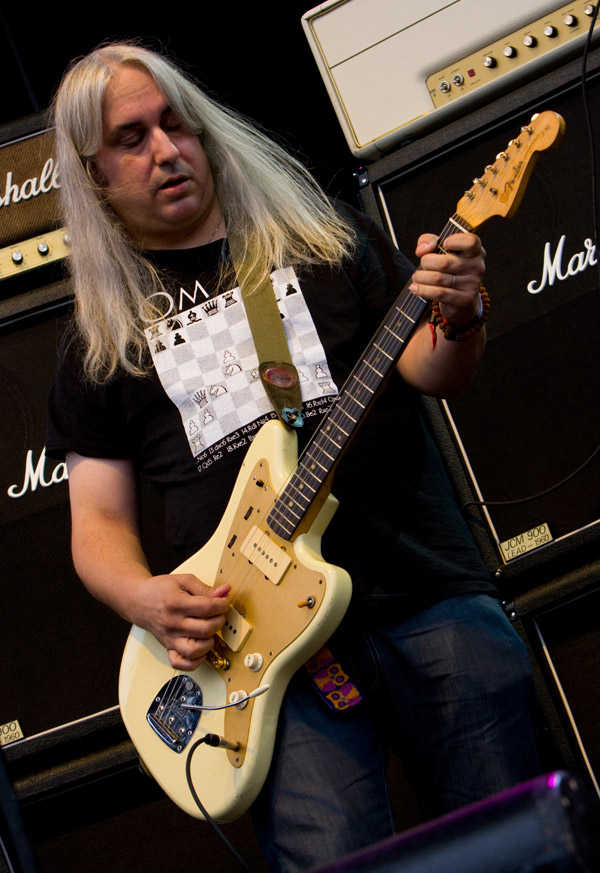

Background information
- Origin: Amherst, Massachusetts, United States
- Genres: Alternative rock
- Years active: 2000–2003, 2009, 2012
- Labels: Ultimatum, City Slang
- Past members: J Mascis; Kevin Sweeney; Kyle Spence; Mike Watt; George Berz; Dave Schools; Matt Hunter

J Mascis + The Fog was an American rock band formed by J Mascis in 2000, following the break-up of Dinosaur Jr. The project released two albums; 2000's More Light and 2002's Free So Free.

== History ==
After fulfilling his contractual obligations to Blanco y Negro in the UK and Sire/Reprise in the US, Mascis went into his home studio in Amherst, MA. Mascis recorded the majority of the instruments during the sessions, with the resulting recordings becoming the first J Mascis + The Fog album, More Light, an album title inspired by Mascis's growing interest in "hugging saint" Ammachi. One of the pivotal songs on the album, "Ammaring", is also about Ammachi. Mascis signed with Artemis Records to release the album.

To promote More Light, Mascis enlisted former Dinosaur Jr. drummer George Berz and former Minutemen/Firehose bassist Mike Watt. Mascis had worked with Watt several times before – most notably producing the final Firehose album Mr. Machinery Operator (1993), on which he also contributed some guitar and vocal parts, and contributing guitar and drum performances to several songs on Watt's first solo album Ball-Hog or Tugboat?. They embarked on four separate tours between October 2000 and the spring of 2001, including a tour of Japan and Australia, a European tour, and two full tours of the US. The set lists would be a mix of songs from both More Light and the Dinosaur Jr. back catalog, along with a handful of Stooges songs and a version of Black Flag's "I've Had It" with lead vocals sung by Watt.

During their first European tour, J Mascis + The Fog participated in a John Peel session for BBC Radio 1, during which the band recorded a medley consisting of Teenage Fanclub's "Everything Flows", Pavement's "Range Life", and The Ruts' "In a Rut". This session is the only commercially available studio recording of the 2000–2001 line-up featuring Watt, and, along with a later J Mascis solo session from 2002, was released on CD by the Strange Fruit label in 2003.

At some of the tour dates, the band were frequently joined onstage by former Stooges guitarist Ron Asheton, during which time Mascis and The Fog would play several Stooges songs. Sometimes the group would be joined by guest vocalists like Evan Dando and Primal Scream's Bobby Gillespie; a London appearance by The Fog with Asheton and Gillespie was marred when a fan spat upon Gillespie, which provoked the singer into hitting the fan with a microphone stand as The Fog and Asheton were playing "No Fun". The Gillespie incident notwithstanding, these appearances by Asheton later led to a one-time supergroup of Mascis, Watt, Asheton, and Ron's brother and fellow Stooge Scott Asheton, which led to the reformation of the Stooges themselves with vocalist Iggy Pop and Watt replacing the late original Stooges bassist Dave Alexander.

A second European tour behind More Light was cut short when the band was involved in a van accident en route to a Swedish concert. Mascis suffered minor back injuries but rebounded from them fairly quickly and began work on the second J Mascis + The Fog album Free So Free, released in 2002. Around the "Free So Free" tour, Mascis enlisted Kyle Spence on drums and Dave Schools (from Widespread Panic) on bass. This would be the final touring incarnation.

In 2003, the house and studio owned by Mascis burned down.

In 2005, Mascis put The Fog project on hold. This was mainly due the reformation of the original Dinosaur Jr. lineup to coincide with the re-release on the Merge label of their first three albums (which had previously been on Homestead and SST).

In December 2009, Mascis played a few shows in England with The Fog, using the Spence/Schools lineup. Mascis and Spence also briefly reconvened in March 2012 – this time with Hayride guitarist Kevin Sweeney – to perform at the Alyeska Resort Daylodge in Girdwood, Alaska.

== Discography ==
=== Albums ===
- More Light (2000)
- Free So Free (2002)

=== Singles ===
- "Where'd You Go" (2000)
- "Waistin" (2001)
- "Everybody Lets Me Down" (2002)
