= GobbleHoof =

American rock band

GobbleHoof were an American rock band from Amherst, Massachusetts founded in 1990. The group was led by Charlie Nakajima, previously of Deep Wound.

Lead vocals were provided by Nakajima, and he was accompanied by guitarist Tim Aaron. J Mascis of Dinosaur Jr. played drums on the bands 1990 debut EP, "GobbleHoof". Mascis also produced GobbleHoof's debut album, Freezerburn, released in 1992.

== Discography ==
- "GobbleHoof", EP 1990
- "Headbanger", single 1992
- Freezerburn, album 1992
