= Elastic Days =

Studio album by J Mascis
- Released: November 9, 2018
- Studio: Bisquiteen Studio
- Length: 41:00
- Label: Sub Pop
- Producer: J Mascis

J Mascis chronology
Tied to a Star (2014)	Elastic Days (2018)	What Do We Do Now (2024)

Singles from Elastic Days
- 1. "See You at the Movies" Released: August 21, 2018; 2. "Everything She Said" Released: September 18, 2018; 3. "Web So Dense" Released: October 16, 2018

Elastic Days is the third solo studio album by Dinosaur Jr. frontman J Mascis. It was released through Sub Pop Records on November 9, 2018.

== Release ==
On August 21, 2018, Mascis announced the release of his new album, along with the first single "See You at the Movies". The second single "Everything She Said" was released on September 18, 2018. The third single "Web So Dense" was released on October 16, 2018.

== Production ==
The album was recorded at Mascis' Bisquiteen Studio in Amherst, Massachusetts, and features vocal contributions by Pall Jenkins, Mark Mulcahy and Zoë Randell.

== Tour ==
In support of the album, Mascis went on a North American tour, starting on November 7, 2018 in Vancouver, British Columbia and finished on December 15, 2018 in Portland, Maine.

== Critical reception ==
Professional ratings
Aggregate scores
Source	Rating
Metacritic	75/100
Review scores
Source	Rating
AllMusic	4/5 stars
Clash	8/10
DIY	4/5 stars
Drowned in Sound	7/10
Exclaim!	8/10
The Line of Best Fit	7.5/10
Loud and Quiet	6/10
MusicOMH	3.5/5 stars
Paste	8.3/10
Pitchfork	7.3/10

Elastic Days was met with "generally favorable" reviews from critics. At Metacritic, which assigns a weighted average rating out of 100 to reviews from mainstream publications, this release received an average score of 75, based on 17 reviews. Aggregator Album of the Year gave the release a 75 out of 100 based on a critical consensus of 21 reviews.

Mark Deming from AllMusic explained that Mascis' vocals on the album sound "more lucid, better focused and more conscious of what he has to say; the performances have a depth of feeling he doesn't always reveal in Dinosaur Jr.."

== Track listing ==
All tracks are written by J Mascis.

No.	Title	Length
1.	"See You at the Movies"	3:22
2.	"Web So Dense"	3:36
3.	"I Went Dust"	3:48
4.	"Sky Is All We Had"	3:06
5.	"Picking Out the Seeds"	3:26
6.	"Give It Off"	2:50
7.	"Drop Me"	3:50
8.	"Cut Stranger"	3:24
9.	"Elastic Days"	3:32
10.	"Sometimes"	3:34
11.	"Wanted You Around"	3:30
12.	"Everything She Said"	3:30
Total length:		41:00

Japan deluxe version
No.	Title	Length
13.	"Say It On"	3:43

== Personnel ==
Musicians

- J Mascis – vocals, guitar, drums
- Ken Maiuri – piano on tracks 1 to 5, 7, 8, 10
- Mark Mulcahy – guest vocals
- Zoë Randell – guest vocals
- Pete Snake – guest vocals
- Pall Jenkins – guest vocals

Production

- John Agnello– mixer
- Steve Hassett – engineer
- Greg Calbi – mastering

== Charts ==
Chart performance for Elastic Days
Chart (2018)	Peak position
German Albums (Offizielle Top 100)	78
US Billboard 200	63
US Top Album Sales (Billboard)	63
US Independent Albums (Billboard)	11
US Vinyl Albums (Billboard)	10
