= More Light (J Mascis + The Fog album) =

Studio album by J Mascis + The Fog
- Released: October 24, 2000 (U.S.)
- Genre: Alternative rock
- Length: 43:22
- Labels: Ultimatum (North America); City Slang (Europe); Pony Canyon (Japan)
- Producers: J Mascis; Kevin Shields

J Mascis + The Fog chronology
More Light (2000)	Free So Free (2002)

Singles from More Light
- 1. "Where'd You Go" Released: 2000; 2. "Waistin" Released: 2001

More Light is the debut album by the alternative rock band J Mascis + The Fog, released in 2000. It can be seen as a solo album of sorts because Mascis played almost all of the instruments on the recording.

== Production ==
The album was composed on electric piano. It was recorded and mixed at "Bob's Place", Mascis's home studio in his native Amherst, Massachusetts. The album title was inspired by the Hindu "hugging saint", Ammachi (also referenced on "Ammaring"). Kevin Shields of My Bloody Valentine and Guided By Voices frontman Robert Pollard contributed to some of the songs.

== Critical reception ==
Professional ratings
Review scores
Source	Rating
AllMusic	3/5 stars
Dayton Daily News	B+
The Encyclopedia of Popular Music	4/5 stars
Entertainment Weekly	B
Pitchfork	8.3/10
Reno Gazette Journal	3/4 stars
Rolling Stone	3.5/5 stars
The Sydney Morning Herald	3.5/4 stars
The Times	9/10
Times Colonist	3.5/5 stars

OC Weekly wrote that "the songwriting is familiar enough to please old Dino fans, especially those whose favorite album was Where You Been." The New Zealand Herald thought that "the songs are consistently good here right from the get-go when this kicks into life on the fuzz-storm opening of 'Same Day' (featuring the first of three vocal guest spots by Guided By Voice's Bob Pollard) then straight into the sleepy pop charms of 'Waistin', and 'Where'd You Go' with its Ziggy Stardust/ Mick Ronson riffery and skyscraping solo." The Washington City Paper opined that "Back Before You Go" "channels both Rainbow and Hüsker Dü to predictably savage effect." The Guardian praised the "tangibly zestful sense of engagement on the part of its creator."

== Tour ==
The supporting tour for the album featured former Minutemen member Mike Watt on bass and former Dinosaur Jr collaborator George Berz on drums. On some stops of the tour, the band was joined by original Stooges members Ron Asheton and Scott Asheton. The tour was a key factor in the reformation of the Stooges (who also added Watt as their bass player, replacing the late Dave Alexander).

One of the London dates for the tour featured Bobby Gillespie of Primal Scream as a guest vocalist in the encores. Reacting to crowd abuse, Gillespie hit a member of the crowd with his microphone, causing injury.

== Track listing ==
All songs written by J Mascis.

No.	Title	Length
1.	"Sameday"	4:16
2.	"Waistin"	3:42
3.	"Where'd You Go"	3:21
4.	"Back Before You Go"	3:52
5.	"Ground Me to You"	4:42
6.	"Ammaring"	4:47
7.	"All the Girls"	3:17
8.	"I'm Not Fine"	3:18
9.	"Can't I Take This On"	3:22
10.	"Does the Kiss Fit"	3:28
11.	"More Light"	5:17
Total length:		43:22

Japanese edition bonus tracks
No.	Title	Length
12.	"Can I Tell You Stories"	1:57
13.	"Too Hard"	5:17
14.	"Leaving on a Jet Plane"	4:10

European edition bonus disc tracks
No.	Title	Length
1.	"Riptide Swim Sideways"	3:35
2.	"Let's Go to Church"	2:53

== Personnel ==
- J Mascis – vocals, guitar, drums, bass guitar, keyboards
- Kevin Shields – guitar, percussion, backing vocals (tracks 3, 7, 10)
- Robert Pollard – backing vocals (tracks 1, 7, 8)

Technical

- Tim O'Heir, Phil Ek – engineering
- John Agnello – mixing
