= J Mascis =

American musician (born 1965)

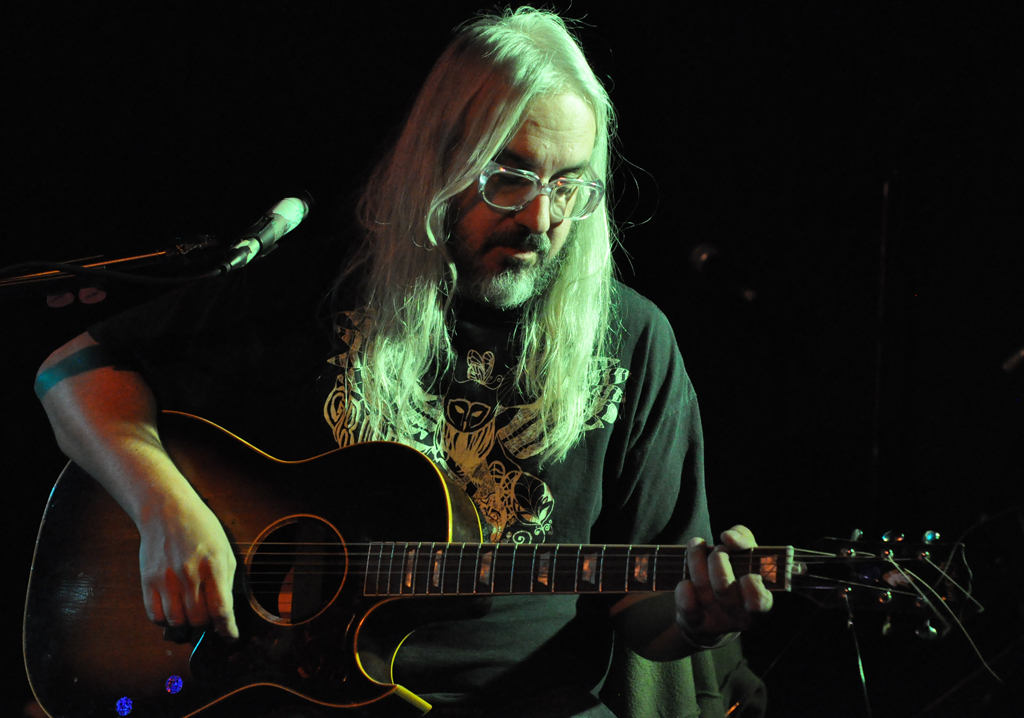
- J Mascis at Sub Pop Showcase, CMJ 2011

Background information
- Born: Joseph Donald Mascis Jr. December 10, 1965 (age 60); Amherst, Massachusetts, U.S.
- Genres: Alternative rock; indie rock; hard rock; noise rock; hardcore punk; stoner rock; doom metal
- Occupations: Musician; singer; songwriter
- Instruments: Vocals; guitar; drums; bass; keyboards
- Years active: 1982–present
- Member of: Dinosaur Jr.
- Formerly of: J Mascis + The Fog; Mascis & Friends; Witch; Deep Wound; Upsidedown Cross; Sweet Apple; Heavy Blanket; Unknown Instructors
- Website: www.jmascis.com

Joseph Donald Mascis Jr. (born December 10, 1965), better known as J Mascis, is an American musician who is the singer, guitarist and main songwriter for the alternative rock band Dinosaur Jr. He has also released several albums as a solo artist and played drums and guitar on other projects. He was ranked number 74 in a Rolling Stone list of the "100 Greatest Guitarists", and number 5 in a similar list for Spin magazine in 2012.

== Biography ==
Mascis was born in Amherst, Massachusetts, the son of a dentist, and grew up in the same area together with his sister Patty and older brother Mike. His mother, Theresa (an avid golfer), died in 1985 while his father, Joseph Sr., died in 1993. He is of Irish-Italian descent.

Mascis became a music fan and drumming enthusiast at the age of 9. He later joined the jazz ensemble in school as a drummer. At 17, Mascis joined the short-lived hardcore group Deep Wound with Lou Barlow, Scott Helland, and Charlie Nakajima in the early 1980s. He went on to found Dinosaur Jr. with bassist Barlow and drummer Emmett Jefferson "Patrick" Murphy (aka "Murph") in 1984, switching to guitar in the process, and they achieved national success. His vocals have been described as "Neil Young-like" and his guitar riffs as "monolithic". Mascis dismissed Barlow from Dinosaur Jr. in 1989 and over the next eight years recorded several more Dinosaur Jr. albums, as well as the 1996 acoustic solo album Martin + Me. In 1989 Kurt Cobain suggested that Mascis join Nirvana as a guitarist.

The manager for Deep Wound was Gerard Cosloy, who then went on to found Homestead Records. Homestead released Dinosaur Jr.'s first record. Mascis says that the reason why Dinosaur Jr.'s sound is not fully formed on that record is that they were more or less automatically signed to Homestead. Megan Jasper, vice president at Sub Pop Records, characterises this period as "J had some anger, like any punk rock kid. Usually, though, when a young person is angry, they tend to be really loud. And J wasn't. He was only loud when he played music".

As a side project, he was the drummer in Boston doom metal group Upsidedown Cross, who released a self-titled album on Taang! Records in 1991. He wrote songs for the film Gas Food Lodging, in which he made a cameo appearance. In 1996, he had a small part in the movie Grace of My Heart and provided a ballad and a Beach Boys-like song for the soundtrack. In 1998, he retired the Dinosaur Jr. name.

In April 2005 Mascis, Barlow, and Murph reformed the band for a tour celebrating the re-release of the group's first three albums. The reunited line-up has since released six new albums: Beyond in 2007, Farm in 2009, I Bet on Sky in 2012, Give a Glimpse of What Yer Not in 2016, Sweep It Into Space in 2021, and There Near in 2026.

=== Solo material ===
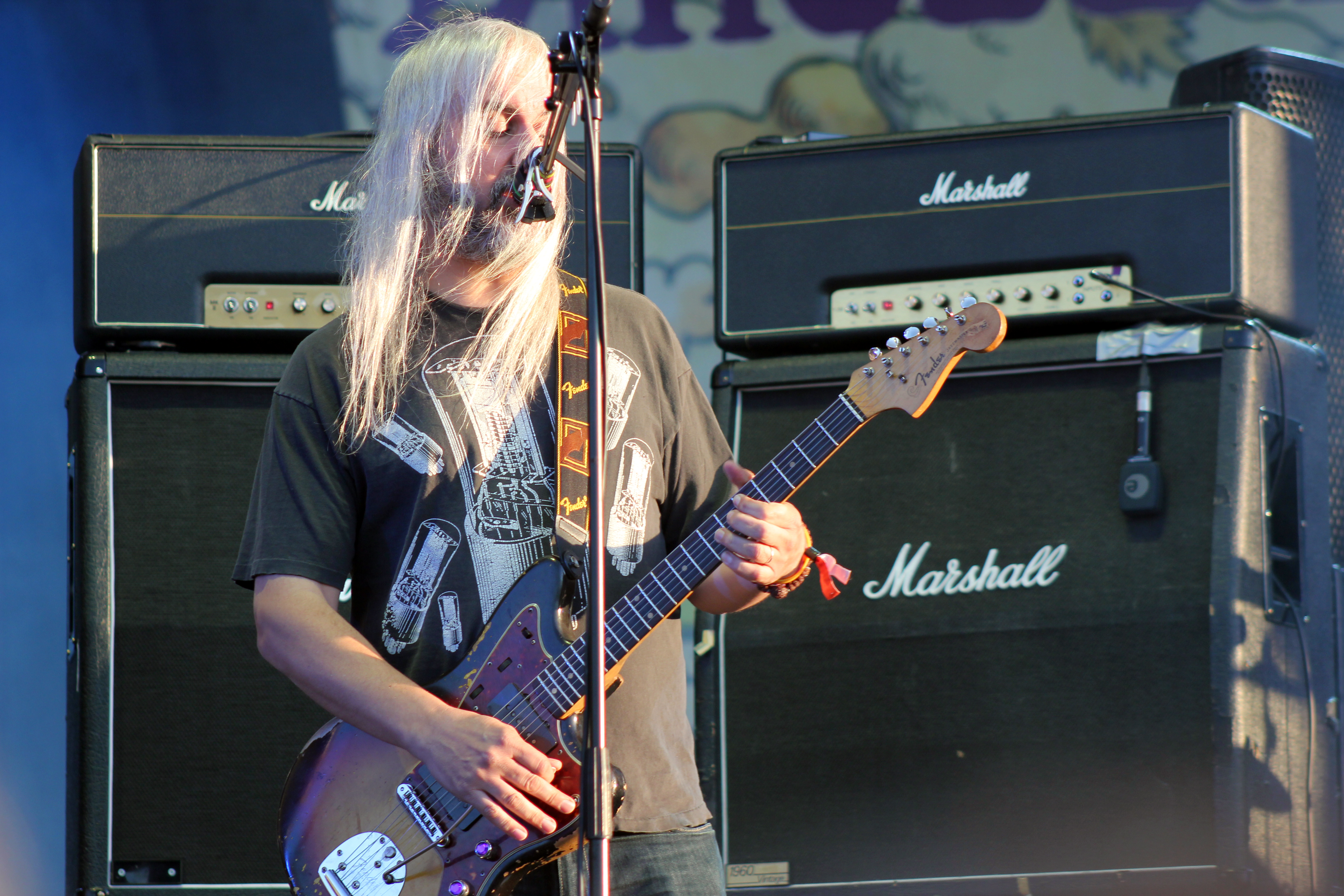
Mascis performing in 2013

In 2000 he began producing albums with his new band, J Mascis + The Fog. In 2003, the house and studio he owned burned down.

In August 2005 Mascis released J and Friends Sing and Chant for Amma, a solo album under the J Mascis and Friends banner. The album consists of devotional songs dedicated to Hindu religious leader Mata Amritanandamayi, or Ammachi, about whom he had written "Ammaring" on the first J Mascis + The Fog album More Light. The proceeds from the album are being donated to tsunami relief efforts Ammachi's organization is spearheading. In 2008 the six-track album was made available digitally on his own Baked Goods label.

In 2006 Mascis returned to drumming with his newly formed heavy metal band Witch for their self-titled debut album.

Also that year, he collaborated with Evan Dando on a new Lemonheads album. The Lemonheads was released that September, featuring Mascis playing lead guitar.

In 2010 Mascis joined with John Petkovic and Tim Parnin of Cobra Verde and Dave Sweetapple of Witch to form Sweet Apple. The self-titled debut album was released on Tee Pee Records. Mascis plays drums, guitar, and sings on the album.

Mascis released a mostly acoustic album in March 2011 titled Several Shades of Why on Sub Pop Records. He was joined in the studio by several guest musicians, including Kurt Vile, Ben Bridwell and Sophie Trudeau. Mascis toured North America with Vile as support act to promote the album. In 2013 Richard Ayoade cast J Mascis in a small role, a caretaker, in his film The Double. Mascis's electric guitar work is featured on the 2014 Strand of Oaks album Heal.

In April 2014 he played with reunited Nirvana on a secret gig after the Rock and Roll Hall of Fame inductions. He sang the songs "School", "Pennyroyal Tea" and "Drain You". In August 2014 he released the solo album Tied to a Star on Sub Pop and toured in support of it.

Mascis joined Unknown Instructors on their fourth album, replacing Joe Baiza as guitarist. The album, Unwilling to Explain, was released in 2019.

In January 2024, Mascis released his fifth solo studio album, What Do We Do Now, on Sub Pop. The album was written and recorded at his home studio in Amherst, Massachusetts, with Mascis playing most of the instruments himself.

== Musical style and influence ==
Mascis is widely recognized for his heavy use of distortion, melodic solos, and a dynamic approach to feedback and sustain, often cited as a key figure in shaping the sound of alternative rock and grunge. His playing is characterized by expressive solos that contrast with his understated vocal delivery. Critics have compared his tone to that of Neil Young and his improvisational tendencies to classic rock icons like Jimi Hendrix.

He has been cited as a key influence by musicians such as Kurt Cobain, Kevin Shields of My Bloody Valentine, and Thurston Moore of Sonic Youth. Mascis’s blending of punk energy with classic rock-inspired guitar work helped pioneer the sound of 1990s indie and alternative music.

== Personal life ==
Mascis's wife, Luisa Mascis, née Reichenheim, whom he met in New York in the mid-1990s and married in 2004, is from Berlin, Germany. They reside in Amherst, Massachusetts, in a house formerly owned by Robert Thurman, a professor of religion noted for his work on Buddhism, and father of actress Uma Thurman. In September 2007 they had a son named Rory. His brother-in-law is German filmmaker Philipp Reichenheim, professionally known as Philipp Virus, the director of the 2006 Dinosaur Jr. DVD Live in the Middle East.

He is a devotee of Mata Amritanandamayi, a Hindu guru and author. Mascis explained that he discovered her in the mid-1990s when "I was at my lowest, as the band got bigger, I got more depressed. I was looking for anyone to help, to feel better". He has described his involvement with Ammachi's teachings as a grounding force in his life. Mascis's 2005 devotional album, J and Friends Sing and Chant for Amma, reflects this influence and marked a shift in his public engagement with spiritual themes.

In 1982 Mascis became straight edge, part of a hardcore punk associated subculture whose adherents avoid drug and alcohol consumption. Since then, he has never used recreational drugs, but does consume alcohol. Mascis is an avid cyclist.

== Signature guitars ==
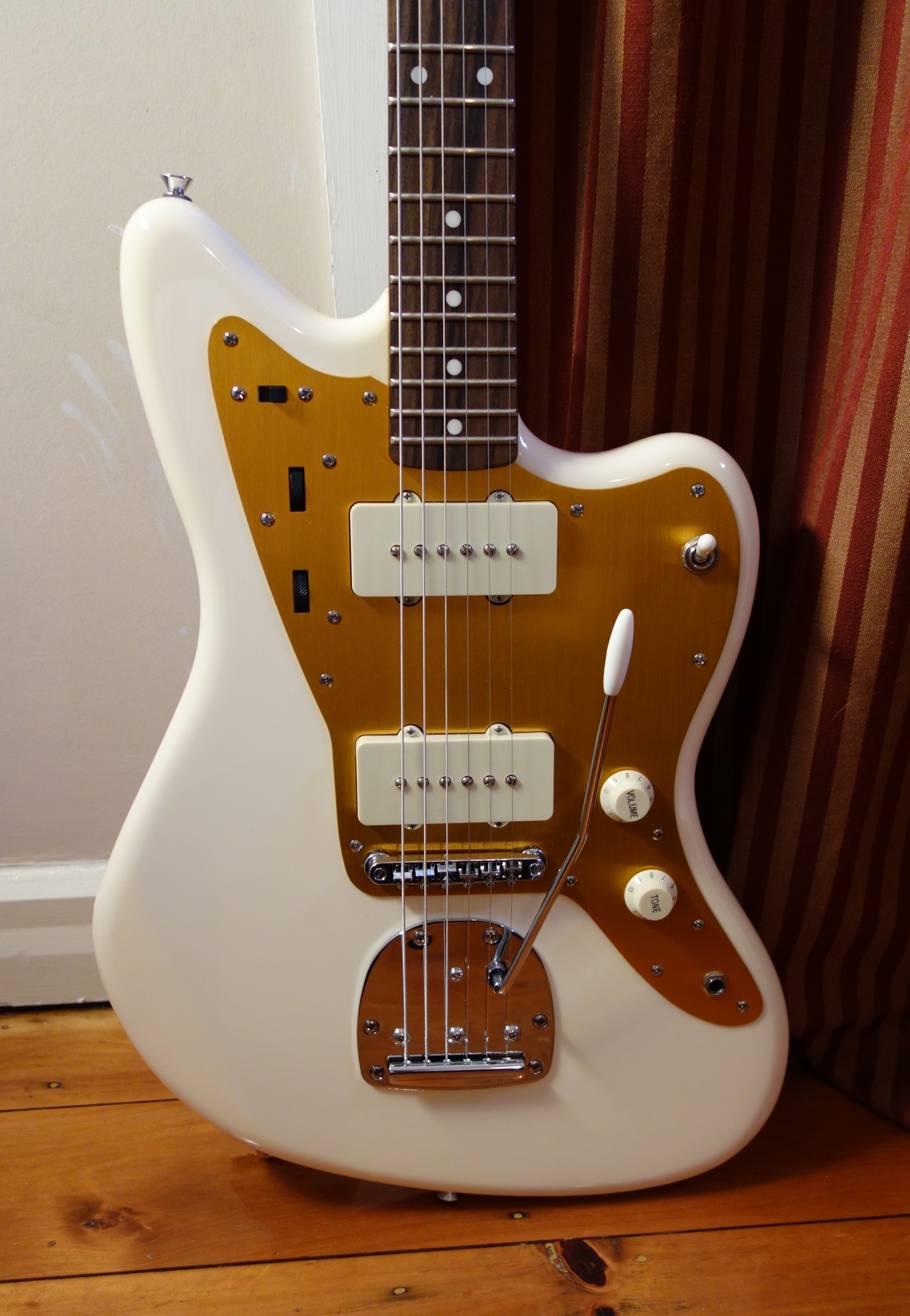
Fender Squier J Mascis Jazzmaster

July 2007 saw the release of a signature guitar by Fender, the J Mascis Signature Jazzmaster. The instrument comes in a Purple Sparkle finish and, while otherwise visually similar to a standard Jazzmaster, features a few modifications J requested.

December 2011 saw the release of the Squier by Fender J Mascis Jazzmaster. This features a basswood body, C-shaped maple neck, rosewood fingerboard with 9.5" radius and 21 jumbo frets, two high output single-coil Squier Jazzmaster pickups, three-position switching and dual tone circuits, gold anodized aluminum pickguard, aged white plastic parts (knobs, switch tip, pickup covers), Adjusto-Matic™ bridge with vintage-style floating tremolo tailpiece, vintage-style tuners, chrome hardware, Vintage White finish, and J Mascis signature on the back of the large '60s-style headstock. This model was discontinued in 2021. Due to demand and chatter on popular social media platforms, Fender re-released the model in early 2023. As of April 2024, the model continues to be produced. As of January 2026, the guitar is still available, though with an Indian laurel fingerboard instead.

== Discography ==
=== Solo albums ===
==== Studio ====
- Several Shades of Why (2011)
- Tied to a Star (2014)
- Elastic Days (2018)
- What Do We Do Now (2024)

==== Live ====
- Martin + Me (1996)
- The John Peel Sessions (2003)
- J Mascis Live at CBGB's (2006)

==== EPs ====
- J Mascis Was Here (2000, Ultimatum Music)

==== Singles ====
- "Leaving on a Jet Plane" b/w "Too Hard" (2001, Sub Pop)
- "Not Enough" (2011, Sub Pop)
- "Is It Done" (2011, Sub Pop)
- "Circle" (2011, Sub Pop)
- "Let It Be Me" b/w "Fade Into You" (2011, Sub Pop, split with Greg Dulli)
- "Fade into You" (2013, Sub Pop, Keep)
- "Every Morning" (2014, Sub Pop)
- "Everything She Said" (2018, Sub Pop)
- "Don't Do Me Like That" (2019, Sub Pop)
- "Can't Believe We're Here" (2023, Sub Pop)

=== Dinosaur Jr. ===
- Dinosaur (1985)
- You're Living All Over Me (1987)
- Bug (1988)
- Whatever's Cool With Me (1991)
- Green Mind (1991)
- Where You Been (1993)
- Without a Sound (1994)
- Hand It Over (1997)
- Beyond (2007)
- Farm (2009)
- I Bet on Sky (2012)
- Give a Glimpse of What Yer Not (2016)
- Sweep It Into Space (2021)
- There Near (2026)

=== J and Friends ===
- J and Friends Sing and Chant for Amma (2005)

=== J Mascis + The Fog ===
- More Light (2000)
- Free So Free (2002)

=== Witch ===
- Witch – Tee Pee Records (2006)
- Paralyzed – Tee Pee Records (2008)

=== Deep Wound ===
- American Style (1982 – 7" – demo)
- Deep Wound (1983 – 7" – Radiobeat)
- Bands That Could Be God LP
- Discography (2006 – Compilation – Damaged Goods)

=== Upsidedown Cross ===
- Upsidedown Cross (1991)

=== Sweet Apple ===
- Do You Remember 7" – Valley King Records (2010)
- Love & Desperation – Tee Pee Records (2010)
- I've Got a Feeling (That Won't Change) 7" – Damaged Goods (2010)
- Elected/No Government 7" – Outer Battery Records (2012)
- Wish You Could Stay (A Little Longer)/Traffic 7" – Outer Battery Records (2013)
- The Golden Age of Glitter – Tee Pee Records (2014)

=== Heavy Blanket ===
- Heavy Blanket – Outer Battery Records (2012)
- Live at Tym Guitars – Brisbane, Australia – Tym Records (2013)
- In a Dutch Haze – Collaboration with Earthless – Outer Battery Records (2014)
- Moon Is - Outer Battery Records (2023)

=== Unknown Instructors ===
- Unwilling to Explain (2019)

=== Other appearances ===
- Buffalo Tom - "Impossible" (1988, lead guitar)
- Ciccone Youth - The White(y) Album (1988, guitar)
- GobbleHoof - "GobbleHoof" (1990, drums)
- Mark Lanegan - Whiskey for the Holy Ghost (1994, drums)
- Mew – "Why Are You Looking Grave?" (2005, guest vocals)
- Boston Spaceships - Tourist U.F.O. (2011, guitar)
- The Breeders – "Do You Love Me Now Jr." (2012, guest vocals)
- Japanese Voyeurs – "Feel" (2012, guitar and backing vocals)
- One Track Heart: The Story of Krishna Das (OST) (2013, several tracks with Devadas)
- Fucked Up – "Led By Hand" (2014, guitar and backing vocals)
- Band of Horses – "In a Drawer" (2016, backing vocals)
- The Breeders – "Divine Mascis" (2023, lead vocals)
