= 2008 in American music =

The following is a list of notable music events and releases that occurred in 2008 in the United States.

== Notable events ==
=== January ===
- 6 – "Crank That (Soulja Boy)" by Soulja Boy became the first song ever to sell over 3 million digital copies in the United States.
- 15 – The Magnetic Fields released their first studio album in four years, Distortion.
- 29 – Course of Nature released their first studio album in six years, and also their final album, Damaged.
  - Decrepit Birth released their first studio album in over four years, Diminishing Between Worlds.
  - Death Cab for Cutie guitarist Chris Walla released his solo debut studio album, Field Manual.
  - The Helio Sequence released their first studio album in four years, Keep Your Eyes Ahead.
  - Idina Menzel released her first studio album in four years, I Stand.
  - Classical soprano singer Margaret Truman, the only child of President Harry S. Truman, died at the age of 83.

=== February ===
- 3 – Jordin Sparks performed the National Anthem and Tom Petty and the Heartbreakers performed the halftime show during Super Bowl XLII at University of Phoenix Stadium in Glendale, Arizona.
- 5 – Lenny Kravitz released his first studio album in four years, It Is Time for a Love Revolution.
- 10 – The 50th Annual Grammy Awards took place at the Staples Center in Los Angeles. Amy Winehouse took home the most awards with five including Record and Song of the Year with "Rehab". Herbie Hancock won Album of the Year with River: The Joni Letters.

=== March ===
- 3 – The Black Crowes released their first studio album in seven years, Warpaint.
- 25 – Counting Crows released their first studio album in nearly six years, Saturday Nights & Sunday Mornings.
  - The B-52s released their first studio album in sixteen years, Funplex.
- 31 – R.E.M. released their first studio album in almost four years, Accelerate.

=== April ===
- 3 – 14 years after their breakup, Donnie Wahlberg confirmed that New Kids on the Block were reuniting along with a new album and tour.
- 7 – The Breeders released their first studio album in six years, Mountain Battles.
- 8 – Stone Temple Pilots announced their reunion after five years apart with a tour beginning in May 2008.
  - Jane's Addiction bassist Eric Avery released his debut solo album, Help Wanted.
- 14 – The CMT Music Awards took place at the Curb Event Center in Nashville, Tennessee.
- 15 – Phantom Planet released their first studio album in four years, Raise the Dead. The band then announced a hiatus later in the year.
- 17 – Danny Federici, founding member of Bruce Springsteen's E Street Band, died at the age of 58 due to melanoma.
- 22 – Blind Melon released their first studio album in nearly thirteen years, For My Friends. It is the first studio album released since the death of original lead singer Shannon Hoon in 1995, with Travis Warren stepping in as lead vocalist on this album.
- 23 – Jane's Addiction played their first show after a four year break at the NME Awards. This was the band's first performance with original bassist Eric Avery since 1991.

=== May ===
- 6 – Gavin DeGraw released his first studio album in five years, Gavin DeGraw.
- 13 – Usher released his first studio album in four years, Here I Stand.
  - Filter released their first studio album in six years, Anthems for the Damned.
- 18 – The 43rd Academy of Country Music Awards took place at the MGM Grand Garden Arena in Las Vegas. Kenny Chesney and Brad Paisley won the most awards with two each.
- 21 – David Cook won the seventh season of American Idol. David Archuleta was named runner-up. This is the last season where the judging panel consisted of only Simon Cowell, Paula Abdul and Randy Jackson, as songwriter Kara DioGuardi joined the panel the following season.

=== June ===
- 3 – Journey released Revelation, their first studio album with new lead singer, Arnel Pineda.
- 10 – Emmylou Harris released her first studio album in five years, All I Intended to Be.
  - N.E.R.D. released their first studio album in four years, Seeing Sounds.
- 11 – The Offspring released their first studio album in nearly five years, Rise and Fall, Rage and Grace.
- 29 – "Low" by Flo Rida featuring T-Pain became the first song ever to sell four million digital copies in the United States.

=== July ===
- 1 – G-Unit released their first studio album in five years, T.O.S. (Terminate on Sight).
- 5 – Katy Perry's "I Kissed a Girl" hit number one on the Billboard Hot 100, becoming the 1,000th No. 1 song of the rock era.
- 22 – Candlebox released their first studio album in ten years, Into the Sun.

=== August ===
- 10 – Issac Hayes died at the age of 65 at his home in Memphis, Tennessee.
- 12 – Michelle Williams released her first studio album in four years, Unexpected.
- 19 – LeRoi Moore, saxophonist and founding member of the Dave Matthews Band, died at the age of 46 due to injuries he sustained from an ATV accident on his farm.
- 26 – Jimmy Wayne released his first studio album in five years, Do You Believe Me Now.
  - Slipknot released their first studio album in four years, All Hope Is Gone.
  - Solange released her first studio album in six years, Sol-Angel and the Hadley St. Dreams.

=== September ===
- 2 – New Kids on the Block released their first studio album in fourteen years, The Block.
- 6 – T.I. broke the Billboard Hot 100 record for a song's biggest jump to number 1 with "Whatever You Like". It jumped from number 71–1.
- 7 – The MTV Video Music Awards took place at Paramount Pictures Studios in Los Angeles. Britney Spears won the most awards with 3.
- 12 – Metallica released their first studio album in five years, Death Magnetic. It is also their first album with bassist Robert Trujillo, who replaced longtime bassist Jason Newsted in 2003 following Newsted's departure from the band in 2001.
- 30 – The Archies released their first studio album in 37 years, The Archies Christmas Album.

=== October ===
- 14 – Sixpence None the Richer released their first studio album in six years, The Dawn of Grace.
- 17 – Levi Stubbs, lead singer and founding member of the Four Tops, died at the age of 72.
- 18 – T.I. broke his own Billboard Hot 100 record for a song's biggest jump to number 1 with "Live Your Life" featuring Rihanna. In went from number 80–1.
- 23 – The BET Hip Hop Awards took place at the Atlanta Civic Center in Atlanta, Georgia.
- 25 – Britney Spears's "Womanizer" breaks the Billboard Hot 100 record for a song's biggest jump to number 1, going from 96–1. She held the record until February 7, 2009, when Kelly Clarkson reclaimed it with "My Life Would Suck Without You".

=== November ===
- 4 – Q-Tip released his sophomore solo album, The Renaissance. It was also his first studio album in nine years.
  - Deftones bassist Chi Cheng was seriously injured in a car crash that left him in a coma. The injuries he sustained in the crash eventually led to his death in April 2013.
- 12 – The CMA Awards took place at the Sommett Center in Nashville, Tennessee. George Strait, Brad Paisley and Sugarland took home the most awards with three each.
- 13 – The 9th Annual Latin Grammy Awards took place at the Toyota Center in Houston, Texas.
- 23 – The American Music Awards took place at the Nokia Theatre in Los Angeles. Chris Brown won the most awards with 3.
  - Guns N' Roses released their first studio album in 15 years and their first album of original material in 17 years, Chinese Democracy. It was also their first album to not feature guitarist Slash, bassist Duff McKagan, or guitarist and co-founder Izzy Stradlin.
- 25 – Stone Temple Pilots frontman Scott Weiland released his first solo album in 10 years, "Happy" in Galoshes.

=== December ===
- 5 – Brandy released her first studio album in four years, Human.
- 20 – Rock and blues singer-guitarist Bo Diddley died at the age of 80.
- 25 – Singer and actress Eartha Kitt died in her home in Connecticut at the age of 81 due to colon cancer.

== Bands formed ==
- Allstar Weekend
- The Belle Brigade
- Blue Giant
- Brass Knuckles
- The Bunny the Bear
- Chicano Batman
- Das Racist
- Dinner and a Suit
- The Drums
- Dum Dum Girls
- Empires
- Falling in Reverse
- Fitz and the Tantrums
- Fun.
- The Ghost of a Saber Tooth Tiger
- Gloriana
- Imagine Dragons
- Joyce Manor
- Kate & Kacey
- Major Lazer
- Mamaleek
- Messengers
- Neon Indian
- One Day as a Lion
- Parachute
- Selena Gomez & the Scene
- Sleigh Bells
- Tiny Moving Parts
- Two Tongues
- The Unlikely Candidates
- Wavves

== Bands reformed ==
- The Archies
- Armored Saint
- As Friends Rust
- Ben Folds Five
- Big Drill Car
- Biohazard
- Black 'n Blue
- Bleed the Dream
- Come
- The Dead
- Denali
- Disembodied
- Dishwalla
- Evildead
- Ex Girlfriend
- Face to Face
- Far
- The Fat Boys
- The Feelies
- The Fluid
- Icon
- The Get Up Kids
- Green River
- Hot Water Music
- Human Waste Project
- Jane's Addiction
- Krieg
- Letters to Cleo
- Liquid Tension Experiment
- Living Sacrifice
- Mest
- N.E.R.D.
- New Kids on the Block
- Oleander
- On Broken Wings
- Paw
- Pentagram
- Polvo
- Rival Schools
- Riverdales
- Saint Vitus
- Snot
- The Sonics
- Spacehog
- Spineshank
- Stetsasonic
- Stone Temple Pilots
- Teenage Jesus and the Jerks
- Tonic
- Truly
- Vision of Disorder
- Yob

== Bands on hiatus ==
- Adema
- The Dresden Dolls
- The Format
- From Autumn to Ashes
- Phantom Planet
- The Starting Line

== Bands disbanded ==
- Another Animal
- Be Your Own Pet
- The Cheetah Girls
- Damone
- Dark New Day
- Hootie & the Blowfish
- Men, Women & Children
- Monster in the Machine
- The Receiving End of Sirens
- Reggie and the Full Effect
- Satellite Party
- Yellowcard

== List of albums released ==
=== January ===
Date	Album	Artist	Genre(s)
1	American Gothic (EP)	The Smashing Pumpkins	Alternative rock
8	Changes	For the Fallen Dreams	Metalcore; melodic hardcore; Christian hardcore; Christian metal
8	Warning Device	Teenage Bottlerocket	Punk rock
8	Good Thing Going	Rhonda Vincent	Country; bluegrass
11	Seasons of Tragedy	Benedictum	Heavy metal
15	Winter (EP)	Jon Foreman	Acoustic
15	Distortion	The Magnetic Fields	Indie pop; noise pop; shoegaze
15	The North Pole Project	Number One Gun	Christian rock; alternative rock; emo
22	Champion	The Audition	Pop-punk
22	Illustrious	Big Noyd	East Coast hip-hop; gangsta rap
22	Oblivion Beckons	Byzantine	Groove metal
22	Unfamiliar Faces	Matt Costa	Folk
22	Venus on Earth	Dengue Fever	Cambodian rock; psychedelic pop
22	Introducing	Foxy Shazam	Alternative rock; post-hardcore; experimental rock; soul
22	Mission Control	The Whigs	Garage rock
22	Chuck Wicks	Chuck Wicks	Country
22	Horror	With Blood Comes Cleansing	Deathcore
22	Line in the Sans	ZOX	Alternative rock; reggae rock; ska
29	Damaged	Course of Nature	Alternative rock; hard rock; post-grunge
29	Diminishing Between Worlds	Decrepit Birth	Technical death metal
29	Another Sound Is Dying	Dub Trio	Dub; punk rock
29	Keep Your Eyes Ahead	The Helio Sequence	Indie rock
29	Slick Dogs and Ponies	Louis XIV	Indie rock; post-punk
29	The Bedlam in Goliath	The Mars Volta	Progressive rock; jazz fusion; funk rock
29	I Stand	Idina Menzel	Pop
29	Moment of Forever	Willie Nelson	Country
29	We Brave Bee Stings and All	Thao & the Get Down Stay Down	Folk
29	Vampire Weekend	Vampire Weekend	Indie pop; Afrobeat; chamber pop; worldbeat
29	Field Manual	Chris Walla	Indie rock
29	Women as Lovers	Xiu Xiu	Art rock; experimental; post-punk
30	Hello...x	Tristan Prettyman	Pop

=== February ===
Date	Album	Artist	Genre(s)
5	Detours	Sheryl Crow	Rock; pop rock; folk rock
5	Rhythm & Romance	Kenny G	Latin jazz; smooth jazz
5	Sleep Through the Static	Jack Johnson	Folk rock; pop rock
5	It Is Time for a Love Revolution	Lenny Kravitz	Rock
5	District Line	Bob Mould	Alternative rock
5	Lucky	Nada Surf	Alternative rock; indie rock
18	Shallow Believer (EP)	The Used	Emo; post-hardcore
19	My Life's Been a Country Song	Chris Cagle	Country
19	Susquehanna	Cherry Poppin' Daddies	Rock; swing; ska
19	Golden Delicious	Mike Doughty	Rock; alternative rock
19	Shh, Just Go with It	Every Avenue	Alternative rock; pop-punk; power pop
19	A Twist in My Story	Secondhand Serenade	Emo; alternative rock; acoustic rock; emo pop
19	Day & Nightdriving	Seven Mary Three	Alternative rock; rock
26	Backwoods Barbie	Dolly Parton	Country
26	You're Awful, I Love You	Ludo	Pop rock; pop-punk; alternative rock

=== March ===
Date	Album	Artist	Genre(s)
2	Ghosts I–IV	Nine Inch Nails	Dark ambient
3	Warpaint	The Black Crowes	Southern rock; blues rock; hard rock
4	Float	Flogging Molly	Celtic rock; punk rock
4	Good Time	Alan Jackson	Country
4	What Doesn't Kill Us	What Made Milwaukee Famous	Indie rock
7	Sixes & Sevens	Adam Green	Anti-folk; blues rock
11	Dreaming of Revenge	Kaki King	Indie pop; indie rock
11	And You Were a Crow	The Parlor Mob	Rock; hard rock; blues rock
11	These Are the Good Times People	The Presidents of the United States of America	Alternative rock
11	Saving Abel	Saving Abel	Hard rock; post-grunge
11	Ego Trippin'	Snoop Dogg	Hip hop; R&B
17	Maybe I'm Dreaming	Owl City	Synth-pop; electronica
17	Brain Thrust Mastery	We Are Scientists	Alternative rock; indie rock; post-punk
18	Get Awkward	Be Your Own Pet	Punk rock; noise pop; garage punk
18	Welcome to the Dollhouse	Danity Kane	Pop; R&B
18	Mail on Sunday	Flo Rida	Hip-hop; Southern hip hop
18	The Odd Couple	Gnarls Barkley	Pop rock; psychedelic soul
18	Heart is Long (EP)	Idiot Pilot	Electronic rock
18	Midnight Boom	The Kills	Indie rock; garage rock
18	A Band in Hope	The Matches	Pop-punk; pop rock
18	Hits	New Found Glory	Pop-punk
18	Volume One	She & Him	Indie pop; alternative country; alternative rock
21	Pretty. Odd.	Panic at the Disco	Psychedelic pop; psychedelic rock; baroque pop; pop rock; folk rock
25	Funplex	The B-52s	Rock; pop rock; new wave
25	Saturday Nights & Sunday Mornings	Counting Crows	Alternative rock; folk rock
25	Gave Me the Clap	Crash Romeo	Pop-punk; punk rock
25	Reason to Believe	Pennywise	Punk rock; melodic hardcore
25	Consolers of the Lonely	The Raconteurs	Alternative rock; blues rock; country rock; power pop; garage rock
31	Accelerate	R.E.M.	Hard rock; punk rock; glam rock; jangle pop

=== April ===
Date	Album	Artist	Genre(s)
1	The Bright Lights of America	Anti-Flag	Punk rock; alternative rock
1	Attack & Release	The Black Keys	Alternative rock; blues rock; garage rock
1	Live in Phoenix	Fall Out Boy	Pop-punk; pop rock
1	We Weren't Crazy	Josh Gracin	Country
1	Low vs Diamond	Low vs Diamond	Indie rock
1	Last Night	Moby	EDM
1	The Feel Good Record of the Year	No Use for a Name	Punk rock
1	Chapter VII: Hope & Sorrow	Sevendust	Alternative metal
1	Troubadour	George Strait	Country
7	Mountain Battles	The Breeders	Art punk; alternative rock
8	Keep Telling Myself It's Alright	Ashes Divide	Alternative rock; alternative metal; hard rock
8	Help Wanted	Eric Avery	Alternative rock; rock
8	Sun Giant (EP)	Fleet Foxes	Indie rock
8	When Angels & Serpents Dance	P.O.D.	Alternative metal; alternative rock
8	All I Feel	Ray J	R&B; hip-hop
15	E=MC²	Mariah Carey	R&B; pop; hip-hop
15	Lovin' Life	Gaither Vocal Band	CCM; Southern gospel
15	Fail on Cue	Jimmie's Chicken Shack	Alternative rock
15	Lady Antebellum	Lady Antebellum	Country
15	Mercy (Dancing for the Death of an Imaginary Enemy)	Ours	Alternative rock
15	Raise the Dead	Phantom Planet	Alternative rock; garage rock
15	The Alchemy Index Vols. III & IV	Thrice	Atmospheric rock; Americana; folk; roots rock
22	When Life Gives You Lemons, You Paint That Shit Gold	Atmosphere	Hip-hop; alternative hip-hop
22	For My Friends	Blind Melon	Alternative rock; rock
22	Stop Drop and Roll!!!	Foxboro Hot Tubs	Garage rock; rock and roll
22	Hello Destiny...	Goldfinger	Punk rock; pop-punk
22	The Black Swan	Story of the Year	Post-hardcore; alternative rock; alternative metal
29	Whisper War	The Cab	Pop-punk; pop rock; power pop
29	Underdog Alma Mater	Forever the Sickest Kids	Pop-punk; pop rock; alternative rock
29	VYP (Voice of the Young People)	Lil Mama	Hip-hop; R&B; dance
29	Hard Candy	Madonna	Dance-pop
29	Mudcrutch	Mudcrutch	Southern rock; country rock
29	Nerf Herder IV	Nerf Herder	Alternative rock; rock
29	Tip of the Iceberg (EP)	New Found Glory	Pop-punk; punk rock
29	Santogold	Santogold	Indie pop; pop rock; indie rock
29	Phil Stacey	Phil Stacey	Country

=== May ===
Date	Album	Artist	Genre(s)
5	...Earth to the Dandy Warhols...	The Dandy Warhols	Neo-psychedelia; indie rock
5	The Slip	Nine Inch Nails	Industrial rock
6	On My Way Here	Clay Aiken	Pop
6	Gavin DeGraw	Gavin DeGraw	Pop rock
6	From First to Last	From First to Last	Alternative rock; post-hardcore; emo
6	Acoustic EP	Motion City Soundtrack	Acoustic
6	Spread the Rumors	Socratic	Pop-punk; emo
8	Nouns	No Age	Punk rock; noise rock
12	Narrow Stairs	Death Cab for Cutie	Indie rock; indie pop; alternative rock
12	We Sing. We Dance. We Steal Things	Jason Mraz	Pop; folk; blue-eyed soul; jazz
13	Division	10 Years	Alternative metal; rock
13	Anthems for the Damned	Filter	Industrial rock; hard rock; alternative rock; nu metal
13	Twelve Angry Months	Local H	Alternative rock; rock
13	With Arrows, with Poise	The Myriad	Indie rock; alternative rock; Christian rock
13	Honestly, I'm Doing Okay (EP)	The Spill Canvas	Alternative rock; emo
13	Here I Stand	Usher	R&B
17	No, Virginia...	The Dresden Dolls	Dark cabaret; art pop
19	Coming to Terms	Carolina Liar	Pop rock; alternative rock
20	3 Doors Down	3 Doors Down	Alternative rock; post-grunge; hard rock
20	Julianne Hough	Julianne Hough	Country
20	Re-Arrange Us	Mates of State	Indie pop; indie rock
20	Departure	Jesse McCartney	Pop; R&B; dance-pop; electropop
20	It's All Happening (EP)	The Takeover UK	Alternative rock
21	Wires...and the Concept of Breathing	A Skylit Drive	Post-hardcore; emo; hard rock
27	Bring Ya to the Brink	Cyndi Lauper	Dance-pop

=== June ===
Date	Album	Artist	Genre(s)
3	The Declaration	Ashanti	R&B
3	Indestructible	Disturbed	Heavy metal; alternative metal; hard rock
3	Fleet Foxes	Fleet Foxes	Indie folk; indie rock
3	Perfectly Clear	Jewel	Country
3	Revelation	Journey	Hard rock; arena rock
3	Weezer (Red Album)	Weezer	Alternative rock; power pop
10	All I Intended to Be	Emmylou Harris	Country folk; Americana
10	Tha Carter III	Lil Wayne	Hip-hop; pop rap
10	Whats Your Medium	The Medic Droid	Synth-pop; power pop
10	Back When I Knew It All	Montgomery Gentry	Country
10	Evil Urges	My Morning Jacket	Indie rock; neo-psychedelia
10	Seeing Sounds	N.E.R.D.	Hip-hop; alternative hip-hop
11	Rise and Fall, Rage and Grace	The Offspring	Alternative rock; punk rock; pop-punk
17	One of the Boys	Katy Perry	Pop; soft rock; power pop; pop-punk
17	Last Stop: Crappy Town	Reggie and the Full Effect	Alternative rock; post-hardcore; metalcore
17	Lookout Mountain, Lookout Sea	Silver Jews	Indie rock; Christian rock
23	Cage the Elephant	Cage the Elephant	Punk blues; alternative rock
24	Rotation	Cute Is What We Aim For	Pop-punk
24	Superhero Brother	G. Love & Special Sauce	Rock; indie rock
24	To Know That You're Alive	Kutless	Christian rock; hard rock; alternative metal
24	GNV FLA	Less Than Jake	Punk rock; ska punk
24	The Sound of Madness	Shinedown	Hard rock; alternative rock; post-grunge; alternative metal
24	...In Color (EP)	The Summer Set	Indie pop; pop rock
24	Last 2 Walk	Three 6 Mafia	Hip hop

=== July ===
Date	Album	Artist	Genre(s)
1	Agony & Irony	Alkaline Trio	Pop-punk; alternative rock
1	T.O.S. (Terminate on Sight)	G-Unit	Hip-hop; gangsta rap
1	The Black Parade Is Dead!	My Chemical Romance	Alternative rock; emo; pop-punk
1	The Bird and the Bee Sides (EP)	Relient K	Rock; pop punk; alternative rock
8	Want	3OH!3	Electropop; crunkcore; alternative rock; electronic rock; dance-pop; Electro-hop
8	Modern Guilt	Beck	Psychedelic rock; avant-pop; neo-psychedelia
8	¿Cómo Te Llama?	Albert Hammond, Jr.	Indie rock; post-punk; garage rock
8	Skip School, Start Fights	Hit the Lights	Pop-punk; punk rock
8	I Pledge Allegiance to the Grind II	Killer Mike	Hip-hop
8	Can't Stop Won't Stop	The Maine	Pop rock; Pop punk
8	Self-Portrait as a Frozen Father	Myka Relocate	Metalcore; post-hardcore
8	Two Men with the Blues	Willie Nelson and Wynton Marsalis	Jazz
9	Stronger Now (EP)	Just Surrender	Pop-punk; emo
15	The Greatest Story Ever Told	David Banner	Southern hip hop
15	Life, Death, Love and Freedom	John Mellencamp	Americana; folk rock; roots rock; alternative country; country rock; blues rock; heartland rock
15	Untitled	Nas	Hip-hop; R&B; political hip-hop
15	Around the Bend	Randy Travis	Country
15	Ace Young	Ace Young	Pop
18	One Day as a Lion (EP)	One Day as a Lion	Rap rock; alternative hip hop
22	Partie Traumatic	Black Kids	Indie rock; indie pop
22	Into the Sun	Candlebox	Rock; hard rock; post-grunge
22	Does You Inspire You	Chairlift	Indie pop; indie rock; dream pop
22	Finch (EP)	Finch	Post-hardcore
22	Slightly Not Stoned Enough to Eat Breakfast Yet Stoopid	Slightly Stoopid	Reggae rock
22	Love on the Inside	Sugarland	Country
29	Along Came a Spider	Alice Cooper	Hard rock; heavy metal
29	Scars on Broadway	Scars on Broadway	Alternative metal; hard rock

=== August ===
Date	Album	Artist	Genre(s)
5	The Airborne Toxic Event	The Airborne Toxic Event	Alternative rock; post-punk
5	C'mon!	Keith Anderson	Country
5	Avalon	Anthony Green	Indie rock; pop rock
5	Fragile Future	Hawthorne Heights	Emo; pop-punk
5	Urgency	Ism	Alternative rock
5	The Anti Mother	Norma Jean	Metalcore; hard rock; post-hardcore
5	There for Tomorrow (EP)	There for Tomorrow	Post-hardcore; pop-punk; emo; alternative rock
5	Only Through the Pain	Trapt	Alternative metal; rock
7	The Revivalists (EP)	The Revivalists	Alternative rock; roots rock
12	A Little Bit Longer	Jonas Brothers	Rock; power-pop
12	Sugarbaby (EP)	Morningwood	Indie pop; dance-rock
12	Lipstick on the Mirror	Pop Evil	Hard rock; post-grunge
12	Unexpected	Michelle Williams	R&B; Dance-pop; electronica
19	Fast Times at Barrington High	The Academy Is...	Alternative rock; pop-punk
19	The Cheetah Girls: One World	The Cheetah Girls	Pop; R&B; hip-hop
19	Dance Gavin Dance	Dance Gavin Dance	Post-hardcore
19	The '59 Sound	The Gaslight Anthem	Rock; punk rock
19	How to Walk Away	Juliana Hatfield	Indie rock
19	The Fame	Lady Gaga	Electropop; synth-pop; dance-pop
19	The Rhumb Line	Ra Ra Riot	Indie pop; indie rock
19	The Illusion of Progress	Staind	Post-grunge; alternative rock
19	No Deliverance	Toadies	Alternative rock
19	Look What You Made Me	Yung Berg	Hip-hop
25	Wave Like Home	Future Islands	Synth-pop; indie rock; indie pop
26	LAX	The Game	West coast hip hop; gangsta rap; hardcore hip hop
26	Holler Back	The Lost Trailers	Country
26	All Hope Is Gone	Slipknot	Groove metal; alternative metal
26	Sol-Angel and the Hadley St. Dreams	Solange	R&B; pop-soul; psychedelic soul; electronica
26	Do You Believe Me Now	Jimmy Wayne	Country

=== September ===
Date	Album	Artist	Genre(s)
2	Swan Songs	Hollywood Undead	Rock; rap rock; nu metal
2	The Block	New Kids on the Block	Pop; dance-pop; R&B; blue-eyed soul; pop rock
2	Lost in the Sound of Separation	Underoath	Metalcore; post-hardcore; screamo
5	The Way Out Is Broken (EP)	Armor for Sleep	Pop-punk; emo; alternative rock
9	Still Unforgettable	Natalie Cole	Jazz
9	Do You Know	Jessica Simpson	Country pop
10	Tigers Jaw	Tigers Jaw	Indie rock; pop-punk
12	Death Magnetic	Metallica	Thrash metal; heavy metal
16	Overcome	All That Remains	Melodic metalcore
16	It's Classy, Not Classic	Breathe Carolina	Synth-pop; post-hardcore
16	George Clinton and His Gangsters of Love	George Clinton	Funk; R&B
16	Why Wait	Kristy Lee Cook	Country
16	We Global	DJ Khaled	Hip-hop
16	Jet Black & Jealous	Eli Young Band	Country
16	Cruel to Be Young	Jonezetta	Indie rock
16	Tell It to the Volcano	Miniature Tigers	Indie pop; indie rock
16	Year of the Gentleman	Ne-Yo	R&B; pop
16	Brass Knuckles	Nelly	Hip-hop
16	Colby O	Colby O'Donis	R&B; pop
16	Censored Colors	Portugal. The Man	Progressive rock; indie rock
16	Learn to Live	Darius Rucker	Country
16	Un Mas Dos (EP)	Straylight Run	Indie rock; emo
16	Dear Science	TV on the Radio	Indie rock; art rock; alternative rock
17	Way to Normal	Ben Folds	Indie pop; alternative rock
19	Only by the Night	Kings of Leon	Alternative rock; Southern rock; pop rock
19	Doll Domination	The Pussycat Dolls	Pop; R&B
23	Loyalty to Loyalty	Cold War Kids	Indie rock; alternative rock
23	Any Port in a Storm	The Dirty Heads	Alternative rock; rap rock; reggae rock
23	Love, War and the Ghost of Whitey Ford	Everlast	Alternative rock; blues rock
23	Tennessee Pusher	Old Crow Medicine Show	Folk; country
23	Sweat It Out	The Pink Spiders	Garage rock; indie rock
23	Big Bad World	Plain White T's	Pop-punk; pop rock; alternative rock
23	Come Around	Sing It Loud	Pop-punk; power pop
29	& Then Boom	Iglu & Hartly	Pop rock; power pop; indie pop
30	New Surrender	Anberlin	Alternative rock; pop-punk; emo
30	The Archies Christmas Album	The Archies	Christmas; pop
30	Shudder	Bayside	Alternative rock; emo; punk rock; pop-punk
30	Declaration	Bleeding Through	Metalcore
30	Christmas Gaither Vocal Band Style	Gaither Vocal Band	Christmas; CCM
30	The Christmas Collection	Amy Grant	Christmas; CCM; gospel
30	Joy to the World	Faith Hill	Christmas; country; big band
30	Jennifer Hudson	Jennifer Hudson	R&B
30	The Dream	In This Moment	Hard rock; alternative metal
30	Innerpartysystem	Innerpartysystem	Dance punk; electronic rock
30	The Glass Passenger	Jack's Mannequin	Pop rock; Christian rock; power pop
30	Kellie Pickler	Kellie Pickler	Country; country pop
30	Paper Trail	T.I.	Hip-hop
30	Live and Lawless	Unwritten Law	Punk rock; alternative rock
30	Wavves	Wavves	Lo-fi; noise pop

=== October ===
Date	Album	Artist	Genre(s)
7	Caroling, Caroling: Christmas with Natalie Cole	Natalie Cole	Christmas
7	Hold On Tight	Hey Monday	Emo pop; pop-punk
7	Japanese Motors	Japanese Motors	Garage rock; punk rock
7	Appeal to Reason	Rise Against	Melodic hardcore; punk rock
7	Life Is Not a Waiting Room	Senses Fail	Post-hardcore; emo; metalcore
7	Elephants...Teeth Sinking into Heart	Rachael Yamagata	Alternative rock; blues rock
10	Christmas Duets	Elvis Presley	Country; CCM; Christmas; pop
12	Sounds of the Season: The Julianne Hough Holiday Collection (EP)	Julianne Hough	Christmas; country
14	Lucky Old Sun	Kenny Chesney	Country
14	Little Bit of Everything	Billy Currington	Country
14	Civil War	Dillinger Four	Punk rock; melodic hardcore
14	Dreamer	Haste the Day	Metalcore
14	The End of an Error	Houston Calls	Pop-punk; alternative rock
14	It's Christmas	Mandisa	Gospel; Christmas; CCM; R&B
14	Secret Machines	Secret Machines	Alternative rock; space rock
14	The Dawn of Grace	Sixpence None the Richer	Alternative rock; Christian rock; indie pop; Christmas
19	Exposion	White Denim	Indie rock; garage rock
21	This War Is Ours	Escape the Fate	Hard rock; pop screamo; post-hardcore
21	The Sound	Mary Mary	CCM; gospel
21	Damn Right, Rebel Proud	Hank Williams III	Country; psychobilly
21	Call Me Crazy	Lee Ann Womack	Country
28	The Dawn of My Death	Before Their Eyes	Post-hardcore; rock; alternative rock
28	Heart On	Eagles of Death Metal	Alternative rock; garage rock
28	Heart Burns (EP)	Laura Jane Grace (Note: The EP was released under Grace's birth name.)	Punk rock
28	The Life of a Song	Joey + Rory	Country; bluegrass
28	Funhouse	P!nk	Pop rock
28	Greatest Hits Volume 1	Rascal Flatts	Country
28	Alpinisms	School of Seven Bells	Indie rock
28	Holiday Spirits	Straight No Chaser	Christmas; A cappella
29	The Sparrow and the Crow	William Fitzsimmons	Folk rock; indie folk

=== November ===
Date	Album	Artist	Genre(s)
4	Play: The Guitar Album	Brad Paisley	Country
4	The Renaissance	Q-Tip	Hip hop
4	Season of Poison	Shiny Toy Guns	Indie rock; indie pop; alternative rock
10	David Archuleta	David Archuleta	Pop
11	Fearless	Taylor Swift	Country pop
14	The Oranges Band Are Invisible	The Oranges Band	Indie rock
18	I Am... Sasha Fierce	Beyoncé	Pop; R&B
18	David Cook	David Cook	Pop rock; alternative rock; post-grunge
18	Day & Age	The Killers	Alternative rock; synth-pop; dance-rock
18	Startin' Fires	Blake Shelton	Country
18	Red Star (EP)	Third Eye Blind	Pop rock; power pop
18	The Foundation	Zac Brown Band	Country
23	Chinese Democracy	Guns N' Roses	Hard rock; rock
24	In the City	Kevin Rudolf	Pop rock; rap rock; hip-hop; electronic rock
24	808s & Heartbreak	Kanye West	Electropop; hip-hop; synth pop; art pop
25	X	Trace Adkins	Country
25	This Time of Year (EP)	Project 86	Christian rock; Christmas
25	Get It Together	The Supersuckers	Rock; hard rock; punk rock
25	"Happy" in Galoshes	Scott Weiland	Alternative rock; rock
26	Home for Christmas	Sheryl Crow	Christmas; country; jazz
28	Phantom on the Horizon (EP)	The Fall of Troy	Post-hardcore

=== December ===
Date	Album	Artist	Genre(s)
2	Circus	Britney Spears	Pop; dance
8	The Pink Lavalamp	Charles Hamilton	Hip hop
9	Universal Mind Control	Common	Hip hop
9	...And a Happy New Year (EP)	The Maine	Christmas; pop-punk; acoustic rock
9	Ty Segall	Ty Segall	Garage rock; punk rock; lo-fi
11	Ghetto Love (EP)	Spinnerette	Alternative rock; rock
12	Roll the Dice	Damone	Rock; hard rock
12	Meet Me on the Left Coast (EP)	The Summer Set	Pop rock; pop-punk
16	When the World Comes Down	The All-American Rejects	Alternative rock; pop punk; power pop
16	Human	Brandy	Pop; R&B
16	Folie à Deux	Fall Out Boy	Power pop; pop rock; pop-punk; pop; R&B; alternative rock; emo
16	Cinco Diablo	Saliva	Nu metal; post-grunge; alternative metal
16	Snoop Dogg Presents Christmas in tha Dogg House	Snoop Dogg	Christmas; West coast hip hop; G-funk; gangsta rap
16	Secret Valentine (EP)	We the Kings	Pop-punk
16	Christmas with Weezer (EP)	Weezer	Christmas; alternative rock; power pop
23	Take It to the Floor	Cash Cash	Synth-pop; dance pop; EDM

== Top songs on record ==
=== Billboard Hot 100 No. 1 Songs ===
- "Bleeding Love" – Leona Lewis (4 weeks)
- "Disturbia" – Rihanna (2 weeks)
- "I Kissed a Girl" – Katy Perry (7 weeks)
- "Live Your Life" – T.I. featuring Rihanna (5 weeks)
- "Lollipop" – Lil Wayne featuring Static Major (5 weeks)
- "Love in This Club" – Usher featuring Young Jeezy (3 weeks)
- "Low" – Flo Rida featuring T-Pain (10 weeks)
- "Single Ladies (Put a Ring On It)" – Beyoncé (2 weeks)
- "So What" – Pink (1 week)
- "Take a Bow" – Rihanna (1 week)
- "Touch My Body" – Mariah Carey (2 weeks)
- "Viva La Vida" – Coldplay (1 week)
- "Whatever You Like" – T.I. (5 weeks)
- "Womanizer" – Britney Spears (1 week)

=== Billboard Hot 100 Top 20 Hits ===
All songs that reached the Top 20 on the Billboard Hot 100 chart during the year, complete with peak chart placement.

- "4 Minutes" – Madonna featuring Justin Timberlake and Timbaland (#4)
- "7 Things" – Miley Cyrus (#7)
- "American Boy" – Estell featuring Kanye West (#9)
- "A Mili" – Lil Wayne (#6)
- "Better in Time" – Leona Lewis (#11)
- "Bleeding Love" – Leona Lewis (#1)
- "The Boss" – Rick Ross featuring T-Pain (#17)
- "Burnin' Up" – Jonas Brothers (#5
- "Bust It Baby Pt.2" – Plies featuring Ne-Yo (#7)
- "Bye Bye" – Mariah Carey (#19)
- "T-Pain" – T-Pain featuring Lil Wayne (#7)
- "Change" – Taylor Swift (#10)
- "Circus" – Britney Spears (#3)
- "Closer" – Ne-Yo (#7)
- "Crush" – David Archuleta (#2)
- "Damaged" – Danity Kane #10)
- "Disturbia" – Rihanna (#1)
- "Don't Stop the Music" – Rihanna (#3)
- "Dream Big" – David Cook (#15)
- "Elevator" – Flo Rida (#16)
- "Fearless" – Taylor Swift (#9)
- "Feedback" – Janet Jackson (#19)
- "Forever" – Chris Brown (#2)
- "Get Like Me" – David Banner featuring Chris Brown (#16)
- "Got Money" – Lil Wayne featuring T-Pain (#10)
- "Gotta Be Somebody" – Nickelback (#10)
- "Heartless" – Kanye West (#4)
- "Hot n Cold" – Katy Perry (#3)
- "I Kissed a Girl" – Katy Perry (#1)
- "If Today Was Your Last Day" – Nickelback (#19)
- "I'm Yours" – Jason Mraz (#6)
- "Independent" – Webbie featuring Lil Boosie and Lil Phat (#9)
- "In the Ayer" – Flo Rida (#9)
- "It's Not My Time" – 3 Doors Down (#17)
- "Just Stand Up!" – Various artists (#11)
- "Last Name" – Carrie Underwood (#19)
- "Leavin'" – Jesse McCartney (#10)
- "Let It Rock" – Kevin Rudolf featuring Lil Wayne (#5)
- "Light On" – David Cook (#17)
- "Like You'll Never See Me Again" – Alicia Keys (#12
- "Live Your Life" – T.I. featuring Rihanna (#1)
- "Lolli Lolli (Pop That Body)" – Three 6 Mafia featuring Project Pat, Yung D and SuperPower (#18)
- "Lollipop" – Lil Wayne featuring Static Major (#1)
- "Love in This Club" – Usher featuring Young Jeezy (#1)
- "Love Like This" – Natasha Bedingfield featuring Sean Kingston (#5)
- "Love Lockdown" – Kanye West (#3)
- "Love Song" – Sara Bareilles (#4)
- "Love Story" – Taylor Swift (#5)
- "Low" – Flo Rida featuring T-Pain (#1)
- "Miss Independent" – Ne-Yo (#7)
- "Mrs. Officer" – Lil Wayne featuring Bobby Valentino and Kidd Kidd (#16)
- "No Air" – Jordin Sparks with Chris Brown (#3)
- "One Step at a Time" – Jordin Sparks (#17)
- "Our Song" – Taylor Swift (#16)
- "Paper Planes" – M.I.A. (#4)
- "Put On" – Young Jeezy featuring Kanye West (#12)
- "Right Now (Na Na Na)" – Akon (#7)
- "Realize" – Colbie Caillat (#20)
- "Right Now (Na Na Na)" – Akon (#7)
- "Say" – John Mayer (#12)
- "See You Again" – Miley Cyrus (#10)
- "Sensual Seduction" – Snoop Dogg (#7)
- "Sexy Can I" – Ray J featuring Yung Berg (#3)
- "Shadow of the Day" – Linkin Park (#15)
- "Shake It" – Metro Station (#10)
- "Shawty Get Loose" – Lil Mama featuring Chris Brown and T-Pain (#10)
- "Single Ladies (Put a Ring On It)" – Beyoncé (#1)
- "So What" – Pink (#1)
- "Sorry" – Buckcherry #9)
- "Stop and Stare" – OneRepublic (#12)
- "Superstar" – Lupe Fiasco featuring Matthew Santos (#10)
- "Suffocate" – J. Holiday (#18)
- "Swagga Like Us" – T.I. featuring Kanye West and Lil Wayne (#5)
- "Sweetest Girl (Dollar Bill)" – Wyclef Jean featuring Akon, Lil Wayne and Niia (#12)
- "Take a Bow" – Rihanna (#1)
- "Teardrops on My Guitar" – Taylor Swift (#13)
- "The Time of My Life" – David Cook (#3)
- "Touch My Body" – Mariah Carey (#1)
- "Viva La Vida" – Coldplay (#1)
- "What About Now" – Daughtry (#18)
- "What You Got" – Colby O'Donis featuring Akon (#14)
- "Whatever You Like" – T.I. (#1)
- "When I Grow Up" – The Pussycat Dolls (#9)
- "White Horse" – Taylor Swift (#13)
- "With You" Chris Brown (#2)
- "Womanizer" – Britney Spears (#1)
- "When I Grow Up" – The Pussycat Dolls (#9)

== Deaths ==
- January 5 – Irene Reid, 77, jazz singer
- January 8 – Clyde Otis, 83, songwriter, producer, A&R
- January 11 – Pete Candoli, 84, jazz trumpeter
- January 18 – Frank Lewin, 82, composer
- January 19 – Ken Nelson, 96, record producer
  - John Stewart, 68, folk and pop singer, songwriter, guitarist, banjo player
- January 29 – Margaret Truman, 83, classical soprano singer, actress, writer
- February 4 – Chris Anderson, 81, jazz pianist
- February 9 – Scot Halpin, 54, rock drummer
- February 13 – Roger Voisin, 89, classical trumpeter
- February 19 – Teo Macero, 82, jazz saxophonist, composer, record producer
- February 20 – Allen Strange, 84, composer
- February 24 – Phil Bodner, 90, jazz clarinetist, studio musician
  - Larry Norman, 60, Rock and Christian rock musician, songwriter, producer
- February 25 – Static Major, 33, R&B and hip hop singer, rapper, producer, songwriter
- February 26 – Buddy Miles, 60, composer, drummer, guitarist, singer, producer (The Electric Flag, Buddy Miles Express, Band of Gypsies)
- March 4 – Leonard Rosenman, 83, film and television composer
- March 10 – Charles Wayne Day, 65, guitarist, bassist, blues performer
- March 21 – Patti Bown, 77, jazz pianist, singer, composer
- March 24 – Chalmers "Spanky" Alford, 52, gospel, jazz, neo-soul guitarist
- April 15 – Sean Costello, 28, blues singer, guitarist
- April 17 – Danny Federici, 58, rock organist, accordionist, glockenspieler (E Street Band)
- April 21 – Al Wilson, soul singer
- April 22 – Pail Davis, 60, singer, songwriter
- April 26 – Henry Brant (94), composer
- May 1 – Jimmy Hagger, 66, country singer, actor (Hager Twins)
- May 5 – Jerry Wallace, 79, country and pop singer
- May 8 – Eddy Arnold, 89, country and pop singer
  - Larry Levine, 80, audio engineer
- May 11 – Dottie Rambo, 74, southern gospel singer-songwriter
- May 15 – Alexander Courage, 88, composer, arranger
  - Walt Dickerson, 80, jazz vibraphonist
- May 24 – Utah Phillips, 73, folk singer, songwriter
- May 26 – Earle Hagen, 88, composer
- May 28 – Jerry Cole, 68, guitarist, arranger
- June 4 – Bill Finegan, 80, jazz bandleader, pianist, composer
- June 7 – Bill Coday, 66, singer, musician
- June 12 – Danny Davis, 83, country music band leader, trumpeter, vocalist, producer (Danny Davis and the Nashville Brass)
- June 17 – Cyd Charisse, 86, singer, actress
- June 27 – Leonard Pennario, 83, pianist, composer
- July 6 – Bobby Durham, 71, jazz drummer
- July 14 – Katie Reider, 30, folk singer, songwriter, guitarist
- July 16 – Jo Stafford, 90, pop singer
- July 20 – Artie Traum, 65, folk guitarist, songwriter, producer
- July 22 – Joe Beck, 62, jazz and session guitarist
- July 24 – Norman Dello Joio, 95, composer, classical organist and pianist
- July 25 – Hiram Bullock, 52, jazz and funk guitarist
  - Johnny Griffin, 80, jazz saxophonist
- August 3 – Erik Darling, 74, folk singer-songwriter (The Weavers)
- August 5 – Robert Hazard, 59, singer, songwriter
- August 10 – Issac Hayes, 65, soul singer, songwriter, actor
- August 11 – Don Helms, 81, steel guitarist (Drifting Cowboys)
- August 12 – Donald Erb, 81, composer
- August 15 – Jerry Wexler, 91, producer
- August 18 – Pervis Jackson, 70, R&B singer (The Spinners)
- August 19 – Clea Bradford, 67, jazz singer
  - LeRoi Moore, 46, saxophonist (Dave Matthews Band)
- August 21 – Jerry Finn, 39, punk-rock producer, audio engineer
  - Buddy Harman, 79, country music drummer, percussionist
- August 23 – Jimmy Cleveland, 82, jazz trombonist
- September 1 – Jerry Reed, 71, country music singer, guitarist, songwriter, actor
- September 3 – Matthew Peaceman, 56, oboist, composer, conductor
- September 7 – Richard "Popcorn" Wylie, 69, pianist, bandleader, songwriter, producer,
- September 12 – Charlie Walker, 81, country singer
- September 16 – Earl Palmer, 83, drummer
  - Norman Whitfield, 68, songwriter, producer
- September 20 – Nappy Brown, 78, R&B singer, songwriter
- September 22 – Connie Haines, 87, singer, actress
- October 1 – Nick Reynolds, 75, folk musician
- October 8 – Gidget Gein, 39, heavy metal bassist and guitarist (Marilyn Manson)
- October 11 – Neal Hefti, 85, jazz trumpeter, composer, arranger
- October 12 – Cliff Nobles, 67, soul singer
- October 15 – Edie Adams, 81, singer, actress
- October 17 – Levi Stubbs, 72, R&B singer, actor (Four Tops)
- October 18 – Dee Dee Warwick, 66, soul singer
- October 24 – Moshe Cotel, 64, composer, pianist
  - Merle Saunders, 74, organist and pianist
- October 28 – George Sopkin, 94, cellist
- October 29 – Mike Baker, 45, heavy metal singer and bassist (Shadow Gallery)
- November 1 – Jimmy Carl Black, 70, singer, drummer (The Mothers of Invention)
  - Nathaniel Mayer, 64, R&B singer
  - Shakir Stewart, 34, record producer, executive
- November 16 – Rusty Gill, 89, singer
- November 26 – De'Angelo Wilson, 29, rapper, actor
- December 2 – Odetta, 77, folk and blues singer, guitarist, actress
- December 7 – Dennis Yost, 65, singer (Classics IV)
- December 19 – Page Cavanaugh, 86, jazz and pop pianist
  - Kenny Cox, 68, jazz pianist
- December 20 – Dorothy Sarnoff, 94, operatic soprano, actress
  - Bo Diddley, 80, rock and blues singer, guitarist
- December 25 – Eartha Kitt, 81, singer, actress
- December 27 – Delaney Bramlett, 69, singer, guitarist
- December 29 – Freddie Hubbard, 70, jazz trumpeter

== See also ==
- 2000s in music
- 2008 in American television
