= A Skylit Drive discography =

- Studio albums: 5
- Extended plays: 1
- Singles: 10
- Video albums: 1
- Music videos: 14
- Acoustic albums: 1

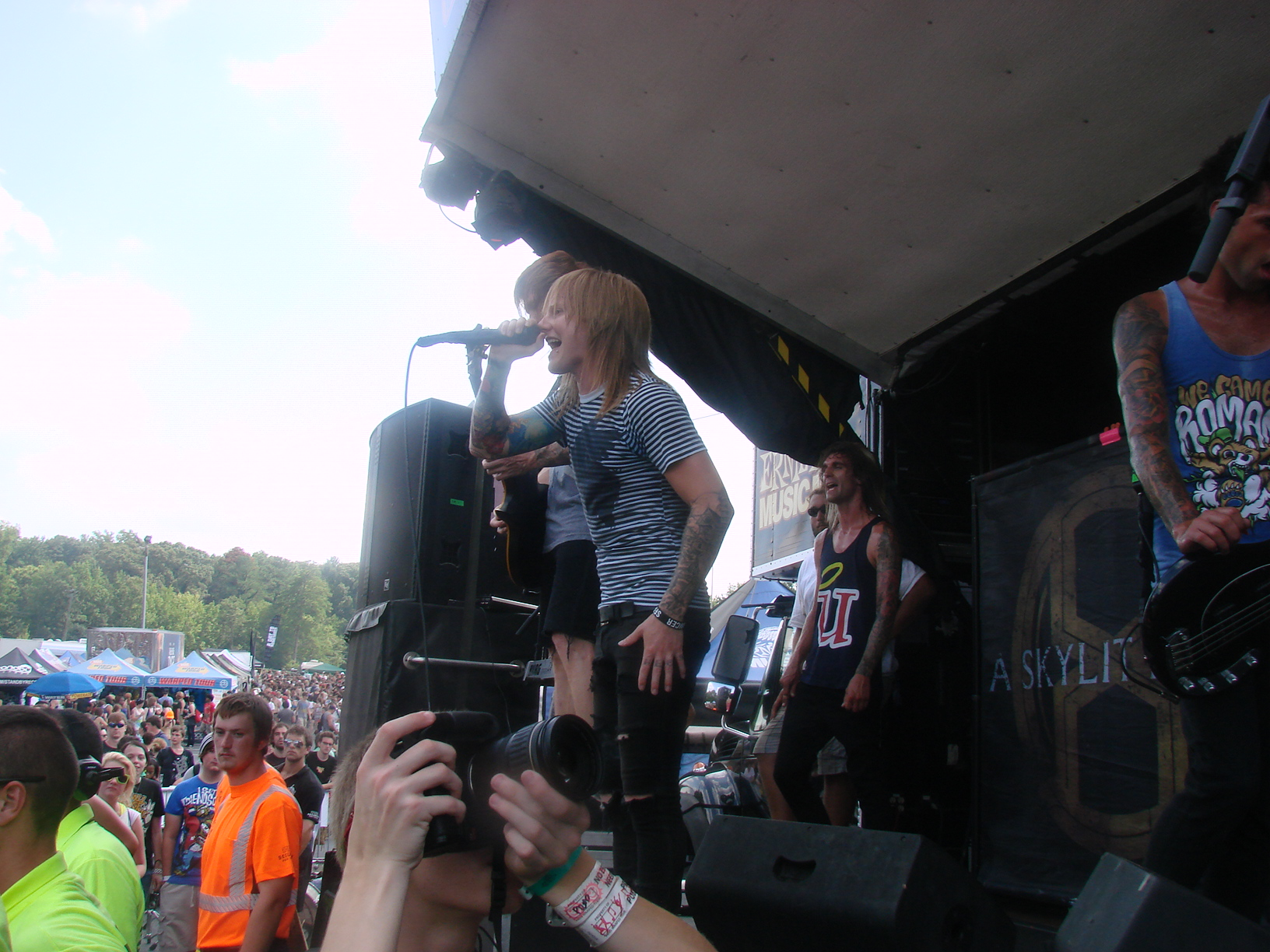

A Skylit Drive is an American post-hardcore band from Lodi, California, formed in 2005. They have released four studio albums, one acoustic album, one extended play, eight singles, one video album, and fourteen music videos, under the labels Tragic Hero Records and Fearless Records.

== Albums ==
=== Studio albums ===
Year	Album details	Peak chart positions				
Year	Album details	US	US Alt	US Heat	US Indie	US Rock
2008	Wires...and the Concept of Breathing: Released: May 21, 2008; Label: Tragic Hero; Format: CD, vinyl, digital download	171	—	9	20	—
2009	Adelphia: Released: June 9, 2009; Label: Fearless Records; Format: CD, digital download	64	19	—	11	24
2011	Identity on Fire: Released: February 15, 2011; Label: Fearless Records, Hassle; Format: CD, digital download	98	16	—	15	26
2013	Rise: Released: September 24, 2013; Label: Tragic Hero; Format: CD, digital download	41	7	—	4	12
2015	ASD: Released: October 9, 2015; Label: Tragic Hero; Format: CD, digital download	59	6	—	7	6
"—" denotes a release that did not chart.

=== Acoustic albums ===
Year	Album details
2015	Rise: Ascension: Released: January 6, 2015; Label: Tragic Hero; Format: CD, digital download

=== Extended plays ===
Year	Album details
2007	She Watched the Sky: Released: January 23, 2007; Label: Tragic Hero; Format: CD, digital download

=== Live Albums ===
Released in 2023, Wires...And The Concept Of Breathing - Live At The Glasshouse was released via Tragic Hero Records.

Wires...And The Concept Of Breathing - Live At The Glasshouse
No.	Title	Length
1.	"Knights Of The Round"	3:40
2.	"Wires And The Concept Of Breathing"	2:48
3.	"Eris And Dysnomia"	3:00
4.	"I'm Not A Thief, I'm A Treasure Hunter"	4:15
5.	"All It Takes For Your Dreams To Come True"	4:27
Total length:		18:10

== Singles ==
Year	Single	Album
2009	"Those Cannons Could Sink a Ship!"	Adelphia
2011	"XO Skeleton"	Identity on Fire
2011	"Too Little Too Late"	Identity on Fire
2011	"Ex Marks the Spot"	Identity on Fire
2012	"Fallen"	/
2013	"Rise"	Rise
2014	"Pendulum - Acoustic"	Rise: Ascension
2015	"Within These Walls"	/
2015	"Bring Me a War"	ASD
2015	"Falling Apart in a (Crow)ded Room"	ASD
2025	"Se7en"	n/a

== Videography ==
=== Video albums ===
Year	Video details
2008	Let Go of the Wires: Released: December 9, 2008; Label: Tragic Hero; Format: Digital download, DVD

=== Music videos ===
Year	Title	Director	Album
2008	"Drown the City"	Brianna Campbell	She Watched the Sky
2008	"Wires (And the Concept of Breathing)"	Scott Hansen	Wires...and the Concept of Breathing
2008	"This Isn't the End"	Robby Starbuck	Wires...and the Concept of Breathing
2008	"I'm Not a Thief, I'm a Treasure Hunter"	Robby Starbuck	Wires...and the Concept of Breathing
2008	"Knights of the Round"	Robby Starbuck	Wires...and the Concept of Breathing
2008	"All It Takes for Your Dreams to Come True"	Color Factory	Wires...and the Concept of Breathing
2009	"Those Cannons Could Sink a Ship!"	Spence Nicholson	Adelphia
2011	"Too Little, Too Late"	Kevin McVey	Identity on Fire
2012	"The Cali Buds"	Dan Fusselman	Identity on Fire
2013	"Rise"	Dan Fried	Rise
2014	"Crazy"	Ernie Gilbert	Rise
2015	"Within These Walls"	Ernie Gilbert	
2015	"Just Stay" (Acoustic)	Ernie Gilbert	Rise: Ascension
2015	"Bring Me a War"	LakeSide Media	ASD
"—" denotes that the director is unknown.
