= Michael Jagmin =

American singer

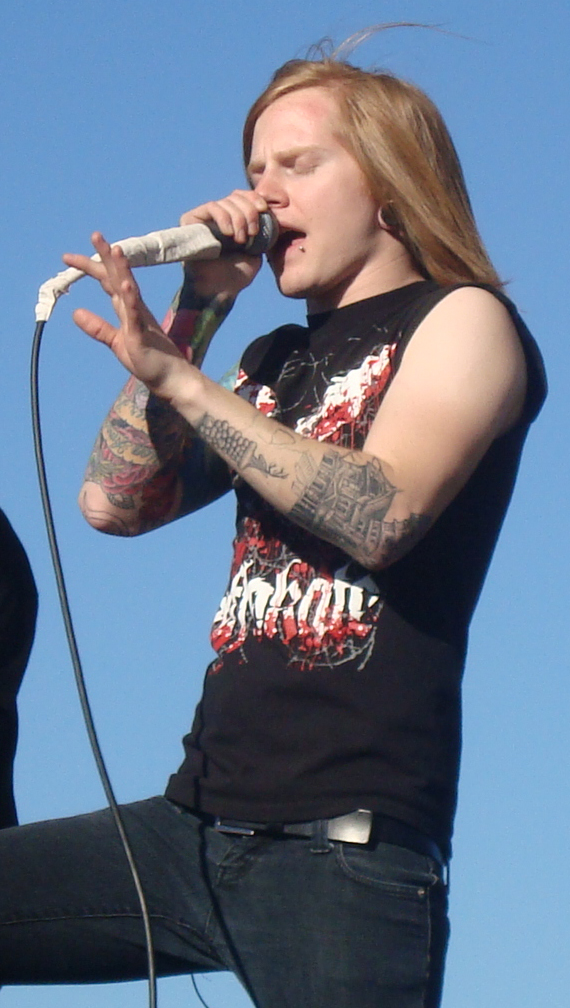
- Jagmin performing with A Skylit Drive in 2010

Background information
- Also known as: Jag
- Born: Michael Jagmin
- Origin: Dallas, Texas, United States
- Genres: Post-hardcore; metalcore; melodic hardcore; pop rock
- Occupation: Musician
- Instruments: Vocals; piano; guitar; bass; keyboards; synthesizers
- Years active: 2007–present
- Labels: Indianola; Tragic Hero; Fearless
- Member of: A Skylit Drive
- Formerly of: Odd Project; Signals

Michael "Jag" Jagmin is an American musician, notable for being the lead vocalist of post-hardcore band A Skylit Drive and former lead vocalist of metalcore band Odd Project. Jagmin is well known for his distinct high-pitched vocal style and possesses a high tenor voice type with a wide vocal range spanning over three octaves.

== Musical career ==
=== Etienne Sin (2012) ===
Jagmin supplied guest vocals for a song by Etienne Sin, and appeared in Sin's video.

=== Solo (2012) ===
In 2018, he formed a band named Signals and released the album, Death in Divide, on November 27, 2020.

== Discography ==
Odd Project

- Lovers, Fighters, Sinners, Saints (2007)

A Skylit Drive

- Wires...and the Concept of Breathing (2008)
- Adelphia (2009)
- Identity on Fire (2011)
- Rise (2013)
- ASD (2015)

Signals

- "Death In Divide" (2020)

Solo

- Sometimes (2012)

Guest appearances

- "New Game" on Discovery (LOST, 2010)
- "Save Your Breath" on Going Steady (Cradle The Fall, 2012)
- "Honey Is Sweet But The Bee Stings" (Etienne Sin, 2012)
- "Del Kings" (Etienne Sin, 2013)
- "Our Love" (Secret Eyes, 2015)

== Videography ==
With A Skylit Drive

- "Wires and the Concept of Breathing"
- "This Isn't the End"
- "Knights of the Round"
- "All It Takes for Your Dreams to Come True"
- "I'm Not a Thief, I'm a Treasure Hunter"
- "Those Cannons Could Sink a Ship"
- "Too Little Too Late"
- "The Cali Buds"
- "Crazy"
- "Within These Walls"
- "Just Stay (Acoustic)"
- "Bring Me A War"

With Etienne Sin

- "Del Kings"
