= Odd Project =

American metalcore band

- Origin: Orange County, California, U.S.
- Genres: Metalcore; post-hardcore
- Years active: 2000–2007, 2025–present
- Label: Indianola
- Members: Matt Lamb; Scott Zschomler; Greg Pawloski; Eric Cline; Christian Escobar
- Past members: Michael "Jag" Jagmin; Mike Knowlton; Jon Kintz; Mike Gordon
- Website: oddprojectband.com

Odd Project is an American metalcore band from Orange County, California, that originally formed in 2000 and has recorded a few demos which resulted in a multi-album deal with Indianola Records. Odd Project then entered the recording studio at Zing Studio's (Killswitch Engage, From Autumn to Ashes, The Agony Scene) and recorded "The Second Hand Stopped" in just less than two weeks. With this release, they toured for over a month and a half and won a spot on the main stage at Hellfest 2004.

== History ==
The band was voted the "#1 Metal Band" on the now defunct MP3.com. The band has played with national acts such as Avenged Sevenfold, Atreyu, Killswitch Engage, and Norma Jean. The band has also appeared in magazines, such as Alternative Press, Metal Hammer, Revolver, and AMP.

On December 17, 2006, it was announced via their official Myspace page they would be changing their name, because of extensive member changes, but the change never happened.

Lead vocalist Michael "Jag" Jagmin officially left Odd Project in late 2007 to become the front for A Skylit Drive, and the band took a long hiatus.

In early 2025 the original members announced they were writing new music. On August 15, their first single "Sound The Alarm!" was released, and on September 5 they released their five song EP Arguing With the Richter Scale.

== Band members ==
Current members

- Matt Lamb – lead vocals (2000–2005, 2025–present)
- Scott Zschomler – lead guitar, clean vocals (2000-2007, 2025–present)
- Greg Pawloski – rhythm guitar (2000–2006, 2025–present)
- Eric Cline – bass, backing vocals (2000–2006, 2025–present)
- Christian Escobar – drums (2000-2007, 2025–present)

Former members

- Michael "Jag" Jagmin – lead vocals (2006–2007)
- Mike Knowlton – rhythm guitar (2006-2007)
- Jon Kintz-Birwood – bass, backing vocals (2006–2007)

== Discography ==
EPs

- Arguing With the Richter Scale (2025)
- KODA (2026)

Studio albums

- The Second Hand Stopped (2004)
- Lovers, Fighters, Sinners, Saints (2007)

Demos

- April 2002 Demo (2002)
- October 2002 Demo (2002)
- July 2003 Demo (2003)
