= Negotiation (disambiguation) =

Negotiation is a process of resolving disputes through discussion, without using force.

Negotiation may also refer to:

- "The Negotiation" (The Office), an episode
- "The Negotiation" (Brooklyn Nine-Nine), an episode
- "The Negotiation" (FlashForward), an episode
- The Negotiation (film), a 2018 South Korean film
- Negotiations (Free Agents album), 2002
- Negotiations (The Helio Sequence album), 2012

== See also ==
- The Negotiator (novel), a crime novel by Frederick Forsyth
- The Negotiator, a 1988 film starring Samuel L. Jackson and Kevin Spacey
