= Mia Pharaoh =

Studio album by Miniature Tigers
- Released: March 6, 2012
- Genre: Neo-psychedelia; dream pop; synthpop; indie pop
- Length: 36:18
- Label: Modern Art

Miniature Tigers chronology
Fortress (2010)	Mia Pharaoh (2012)	Cruel Runnings (2014)

Professional ratings
Aggregate scores
Source	Rating
Metacritic	71
Review scores
Source	Rating
AllMusic	3.5/5 stars
Rolling Stone	3.5/5 stars
Consequence of Sound	B

Mia Pharaoh is the third studio album by Miniature Tigers and was released March 6, 2012.

== Track list ==
1. "Sex on the Regular" – 3:31
2. "Female Doctor" – 4:18
3. "Cleopatra" – 3:48
4. "Afternoons with David Hockney" – 3:58
5. "Easy as All That" – 3:27
6. "Flower Door" – 4:00
7. "Boomerang" – 3:46
8. "Ugly Needs" – 3:27
9. "Angel Bath" – 4:32
10. "Husbands & Wives" – 3:43
11. "Pleasure Princess" – 4:34 (iTunes Exclusive)
12. "Hologram Girl" – 3:58 (iTunes Exclusive)

== Charts ==
Chart (2012)	Peak position
US Heatseekers Albums (Billboard)	32
