= The Verge (album) =

Studio album by There for Tomorrow
- Released: June 28, 2011
- Recorded: Paint It Black Studios
- Genre: Alternative rock; emo
- Length: 48:35
- Label: Hopeless
- Producer: Michael "Elvis" Baskette

There for Tomorrow chronology
Re:Creations (EP) (2010)	The Verge (2011)	Nightscape (2014)

Singles from The Verge
- 1. "Hunt Hunt Hunt" Released: February 29, 2011; 2. "The Joyride" Released: June 28, 2011

Professional ratings
Review scores
Source	Rating
Rock Sound	7/10 stars
Alter the Press	4/5 stars
Under The Gun Review	9/10

The Verge is the third and final studio album by American rock band There for Tomorrow. It was released on Hopeless Records on June 28, 2011. The album was voted one of the most anticipated albums of the year by the Alternative Press. The album's first single, "Hunt Hunt Hunt", was released on February 29, 2011. The second single is "The Joyride", and it was released on June 28, 2011. The Verge's album art and track listing was released on May 12, 2011, with each song length released on May 29.

== Pre-release and writing ==
In an interview, the recording process was described as "Dream-like". The band also stated that the album "just came" and described the sound of the album as "the sound of us letting go."

== Reception ==
Overall reception has been good for The Verge. Alter the Press said that There for Tomorrow "have upped the ante significantly" in their music writing. Many reviewers note the progress in their writing, Maile's falsetto on BLU, and how longtime fans would be pleased.

== Track listing ==
All tracks are written by There for Tomorrow.

No.	Title	Length
1.	"The Verge"	3:42
2.	"Nowhere BLVD."	3:57
3.	"SAAVE"	3:34
4.	"The Joyride"	4:10
5.	"Hunt Hunt Hunt"	3:08
6.	"Circle of Lies"	4:03
7.	"Get It"	4:02
8.	"18"	3:33
9.	"Slip Inside (The Barrel of Your Gun)"	4:40
10.	"BLU"	4:32
11.	"Stopwatch Affair"	5:04
12.	"I'd Be Changing If I Were You"	4:12
Total length:		48:35

iTunes Bonus Track
No.	Title	Length
13.	"Get It (Creature Version)"	4:22

== Personnel ==
- Maika Maile – lead vocals, rhythm guitar, piano on "BLU"
- Christian Climer – lead guitar, backing vocals
- Jay Enriquez – bass, backing vocals
- Christopher Kamrada – drums, percussion
- The Undesigned – art direction
- James Lano – design
- Jeff Moll – editor
- Gage Young – photography
- Dave Holdredge – engineer
- Larry Mazer – management
- Mastered by – Alan Douches
- Mastered in – West West Side Music
- Mixed by – Dave Holdredge
- Written, recorded, and mixed – Paint It Black Studios

== Charts ==
Chart (2011)	Peak position
U.S. Billboard Heatseekers Albums	14
