= The Second Hand Stopped =

Studio album by Odd Project
- Released: July 13, 2004
- Recorded: 2004
- Genre: Metalcore
- Length: 37:15
- Label: Indianola

Odd Project chronology
July 2003 Demo (2003)	The Second Hand Stopped (2004)	Lovers, Fighters, Sinners, Saints (2007)

Professional ratings
Review scores
Source	Rating
AllMusic	3.5/5 stars

The Second Hand Stopped is the debut studio album by American metalcore band Odd Project, released on July 13, 2004.

== Track listing ==
1. Statistics Like Cigarettes – 3:41
2. The Phone Is Such A Blunt Object – 3:32
3. A Hero's Trial – 4:23
4. A Perfect Smile and Broken Wings – 3:33
5. Tear Stained Lies – 3:40
6. Love – 3:19
7. The Fashion Police Hate Robots – 3:31
8. Photographic Memories – 4:57
9. The Wanderer – 2:02
10. Silver Screen Lovers – 4:37

== Personnel ==
- Matt Lamb – lead vocals
- Scott Zschomler – lead guitar, unclean vocals
- Eric Cline – bass guitar, backing vocals
- Greg Pawloski – rhythm guitar
- Christian Escobar – drums
