= Pages (EP) =

EP by There for Tomorrow
- Released: March 27, 2007
- Studio: Wisner Productions
- Genre: Alternative rock; pop punk
- Length: 18:40
- Label: Self-Released
- Producer: James Paul Wisner

There for Tomorrow chronology
Point of Origin (2004)	Pages (2007)	There for Tomorrow (EP) (2008)

Singles from Pages
- 1. "Pages" Released: April 25, 2008

Pages is the first EP by American rock band There for Tomorrow, released on March 27, 2007. It was produced by James Paul Wiser and mixed Adam Barber. It is the band's first release to have a title track. The band released their first music video for the track "Pages" directed by Chris Grieder.

Four of the tracks, "Addiction and Her Name", "Pages", "Waiting", and "Taking Chances" were remixed, re-recorded and reappear on the second EP released by the band, the self-titled There for Tomorrow.

== Background and recording ==
The earliest time of development is 2005, when the band still had James Flaherty on vocals and guitar. He left on the same year for "undisclosed reasons", so for some time, the band was a trio although they were looking for recruits. The band lost their record deal with WP Records since they went defunct, so they have to go solo. On the same year, the band announced that Christian Climer joined the crew. They came across James Paul Wisner (Underoath, and Paramore) was working with them as producer.

The band later found YouTube as a perfect place to make updates, skits, and overall promote the band in 2006. There are multiple videos out there showing the band live, singing early versions of their songs such as Wrong Way To Hide, Waiting, and This Past Year which never had an official audio.

== Release and promotion ==
Professional ratings
Review scores
Source	Rating
AbsolutePunk.net	68% link
Driven Far Off	9/10

The effort was released on March 27, 2007, and some of the tracks were remixed, re-recorded and reappear on the second EP released by the band, the self-titled There for Tomorrow.

Along with the EP, the band released their first music video for "Pages" directed by Chris Grieder.

Driven Far Off was pleased with the effort "Powerful vocals, addictive guitars, and crazy energy, what's there to stop you from picking this up on Tuesday."

== Track listing ==
All tracks are written by There for Tomorrow.

No.	Title	Length
1.	"Wrong Way to Hide"	3:41
2.	"Addiction and Her Name"	3:08
3.	"Pages"	3:33
4.	"Waiting"	3:47
5.	"Taking Chances"	4:31
Total length:		18:40

== Personnel ==
There for Tomorrow

- Maika Maile – lead vocals, rhythm guitar, programming
- Christian Climer – lead guitar, backing vocals
- Jay Enriquez – bass, backing vocals
- Christopher Kamrada – drums, samples

Technical Personnel

- James Paul Wisner – Producer and mixing
- Adam Barber – Mixing
- Gavin Lurssen – Mastering
- Chris Gill – Engineer
- Robert Columbus – Drum technician
