= Re:Creations =

EP by There for Tomorrow
- Released: October 19, 2010
- Genre: Alternative rock; pop punk
- Length: 28:50
- Label: Hopeless
- Producer: Maika Maile

There for Tomorrow chronology
A Little Faster (2009)	Re:Creations (2010)	The Verge (2011)

Re:Creations is the third EP by American rock band There for Tomorrow. It was released through Hopeless Records on October 19, 2010. Re:Creations includes remixes done by There for Tomorrow as well remixes by DJs Twerkshop and DallasK. The EP remixes tracks from A Little Faster, and features two new tracks.

== Reception ==
Professional ratings
Review scores
Source	Rating
AltPress	Positive
Campus Circle	A−

Upon release, Re:Creations received little coverage, with the exception of two reviews by AltPress and Campus Circle. Both publications praised the re-arrangements, finding the remixes better than the original songs. Brien Overly of Campus Circle remarked that "...the potential shown on this EP bodes very well for whatever the foursome have in store...", while Robert Ham of AltPress called it "downright likeable".

Both critics praised the remix of "Deathbed". Overly described it as "...darker and moodier than the original...with the addition of dubstep-meets-hip-hop-beats and synth accents", while Ham called it a track with "synthesizers worthy of Trent Reznor and a sexy, chrome-colored beat."

Opinions on the track "Burn the Night Away" differed between Overly and Ham. While Ham praised the "simmering pulse" and "jerking dubstep rhythms" of the remix, Overly had a more negative opinion on the track, claiming that it "loses [the] heartstring-pulling connectivity" of the original due to "...distortion and dance club beats."

Overly's opinions on the new tracks from the album were positive. He described the song "Small World" as "captur[ing] the magic the band traditionally brings to their albums and the stage", pointing out that it "...also showcases a new aural maturity at the same time.", while also collectively describing "Small World" and "Soul Full Solace (Interlude)" as having "intimate lyricism", and "balanc[ing] [Maika Maile's] sweeping vocals and guitarist Christian Climer’s anthemic arena rock shredding."

Additionally, Overly named "Re:Stories" as the album's standout track.

== Track listing ==
All tracks are written by There for Tomorrow.

No.	Title	Length
1.	"Small World"	4:56
2.	"Re:Burn"	4:02
3.	"Re: Deathbed"	3:41
4.	"Soul Full Solace (Interlude)"	2:09
5.	"Re:Stories"	4:51
6.	"Small World (DallasK Remix)"	4:56
7.	"The World Calling (Twerkshop Remix)"	4:15
Total length:		28:50

Japanese Bonus Track
No.	Title	Length
1.	"Waiting (Acoustic)"	4:23

== Personnel ==
- Maika Maile
- Christian Climer
- Jay Enriquez
- Christopher Kamrada
