= Love and Distance =

Studio album by The Helio Sequence
- Released: June 8, 2004
- Recorded: January 2003 – January 2004
- Genre: Alternative rock
- Length: 46:50
- Label: Sub Pop
- Producer: The Helio Sequence

The Helio Sequence chronology
Young Effectuals (2001)	Love and Distance (2004)	Keep Your Eyes Ahead (2008)

Professional ratings
Review scores
Source	Rating
Allmusic	link

Love and Distance is the third release from the Portland-based band The Helio Sequence. It was released on June 8, 2004 by Sub Pop Records.

== Track listing ==
1. "Harmonica Song" – 5:50
2. "Repeater" – 4:22
3. "Don't Look Away" – 4:11
4. "Let It Fall Apart" – 4:57
5. "Everyone Knows Everyone" – 3:36
6. "The People of the Secret" – 4:38
7. "Blood Bleeds" – 4:25
8. "S.O.S." – 4:50
9. "So Stop!" – 4:18
10. "Looks Good (But You Looked Away)" – 5:43
