= A Little Faster =

Studio album by There for Tomorrow
- Released: June 9, 2009
- Recorded: @ Wisner Productions, Orlando, Florida
- Genres: Alternative rock; pop punk; emo
- Length: 39:25
- Label: Hopeless
- Producers: David Bendeth; James Paul Wisner

There for Tomorrow chronology
There for Tomorrow (EP) (2008)	A Little Faster (2009)	Re:Creations (EP) (2010)

Singles from A Little Faster
- 1. "A Little Faster" Released: August 3, 2009; 2. "Deathbed" Released: November 15, 2010

A Little Faster is the second studio album by American rock band There for Tomorrow. It was released on June 9, 2009, through Hopeless Records. It debuted on June 27 at #181 in the Billboard 200, #9 Heatseekers Albums and #37 in the Independent Album charts of Billboard. It stayed for 6 weeks in the Heatseekers chart. It was released in the UK on April 5, 2010. It reached #63 on Alternative iTunes UK. The first single of the album was "A Little Faster". Later followed by the second single "Deathbed".

== Track listing ==
All tracks are written by There for Tomorrow

No.	Title	Length
1.	"The Remedy"	3:36
2.	"A Little Faster"	3:05
3.	"Wish You Away"	3:41
4.	"Backbone"	2:46
5.	"Deathbed"	3:14
6.	"Just in Time"	3:35
7.	"Stories"	3:05
8.	"I Can't Decide"	4:51
9.	"Sore Winner"	3:31
10.	"Burn the Night Away"	3:25
11.	"The World Calling"	4:41
Total length:		39.25

iTunes Bonus Track
No.	Title	Length
1.	"A Little Faster (Acoustic) [Bonus Track]"	3:13

Deluxe Edition
No.	Title	Length
12.	"Small World"	4:56
13.	"Re:Burn"	4:03
14.	"Re:Deathbed"	3:41
15.	"Soul Full Solace (Interlude)"	2:09
16.	"Re:Stories"	4:51

B-Sides
No.	Title	Length
1.	"Remedy (Acoustic Demo)"	3:35
2.	"A Little Faster (Acoustic)"	3:12

There was also a B-Side bonus track on the A Little Faster album that was featured on the "Another Hopeless Summer 2010" compilation and available for download on iTunes called "9 To 5".

== Personnel ==
- Maika Haini Maile – lead vocals, rhythm guitar, programming
- Christian Climer – lead guitar, backing vocals
- Jay Enriquez – bass, backing vocals
- Christopher Kamrada – drums, samples
- David Bendeth – producer, mixing
- James Paul Wisner – producer
- Dan Korneff – mixing
- Jason Aaron Adams – engineer

== Reception ==
Professional ratings
Review scores
Source	Rating
AbsolutePunk.net	(83%)
Rock on Request	(favorable)

The reviews for the album have generally been positive and by far, most critics have given it 3/5.

Sean Reid at Alter The Press! gave the album a score of 3/5, stating:

Overall ‘A Little Faster’ is an impressive effort from the Orlando four-piece and it serves its purpose and achieves its aim of being an efficient, clean record with songs that will be played on repeat throughout the summer months. Whilst at the same time there are glimpses of an angry, young band that put all their effort into writing the best songs possible, simply because they are passionate and care about the music they are making.

There For Tomorrow have a great formula for success; catchy, radio-friendly hooks, a smooth, clean image and a passion for writing great songs.

== Charts ==
Chart (2009)	Peak position
U.S. Billboard 200	181
U.S. Billboard Heatseekers Albums	9
U.S. Billboard Independent Albums	37

== Other media ==
The song "A Little Faster" was featured on Cartoon Network for the premiere of Ben 10: Alien Swarm in November 2009, and was later released to the Rock Band Network on March 23, 2010. This song was used in 2011 to advertise the 'rivalry' between the Nerf series of the N-Strike 'Gear Up' repainted blasters and the new Vortex disc blasters.
