= Com Plex =

Studio album by the Helio Sequence
- Released: September 5, 2000
- Recorded: January – May 2000
- Genre: Indie rock
- Length: 45:32
- Label: Cavity Search
- Producer: The Helio Sequence

The Helio Sequence chronology
Accelerated Slow Motion Cinema (1999)	Com Plex (2000)	Young Effectuals (2001)

Com Plex is the first album by indie rock band the Helio Sequence. It was released on September 5, 2000, on Cavity Search Records. It contains a cover of the Beatles song "Tomorrow Never Knows".

== Critical reception ==
Professional ratings
Review scores
Source	Rating
AllMusic	4/5 stars
Pitchfork	6.6/10

The New York Times wrote that "layers of echoing guitars and whirring, swooping synthesizers make the music shimmer like an Impressionist landscape, edgeless and enveloping."

== Track listing ==
1. "Stracenska 612" – 5:42
2. "Just Mary Jane" – 4:47
3. "Transistor Radio" – 5:23
4. "My Heart" – 5:41
5. "Sassafras" – 6:35
6. "Stitches Sewing" – 2:36
7. "Tomorrow Never Knows" – 4:10
8. "Big Jet Sky" – 4:33
9. "Demographics" – 6:01

== Personnel ==
- The Helio Sequence – Producer, engineer, mastering, mixing
- Brandon Summers – Guitar, vocals
- Benjamin Weikel – Drums, keyboards, vocals
- Juleah Weikel – Artwork, graphic design, graphic layout
