= Point of Origin (There for Tomorrow album) =

Studio album by There for Tomorrow
- Released: April 30, 2004
- Studio: WP Studios (Orlando, Florida)
- Genre: Post-hardcore; emo
- Length: 46:52
- Label: WP
- Producer: Lami Wolfgramm; LeRoy Wolfgramm

There for Tomorrow chronology
Point of Origin (2004)	Pages (EP) (2007)

Point of Origin is the debut studio album by American rock band There for Tomorrow, released on April 30, 2004, via WP Records. It was produced by Lami and LeRoy Wolfgramm and mixed by Tony Battaglia. The album was the only one to feature James Flaherty on guitar.

== Background and recording ==
After signing into WP Records, they started production of their debut album. They entered the studio with Lami and LeRoy Wolfgramm recorded some songs. On the Wolfgramm Productions' website, they announced the band to the roster and showcased early demos of their songs. The album was made when the band were 15–17 years old.

== Release and promotion ==
After finally being done in the final stages of being manufactured, the band made a release party on the same day, celebrating the hard work of the band and thanking the fans for helping out, they sold the cd for $10.

On July 18, 2004, the band did an interview with Real Rock 101.1 FM and performed an acoustic song live. The band attended Vans Warped Tour 2004 on July 29. Maika also did an interview with Christ Isn't a Fad on October 11, 2004 and on Planet Tonga.

== Reception ==
Professional ratings
Review scores
Source	Rating
Mindset Magazine	9/10
Inside Metal	8.5/10

The debut album received positive reviews, Collin Reed of Mindset Magazine "There for Tomorrow breathes a whole new life into a genre filled to the brim with untalented fasioncore schmucks."

Sam Humphreys of Inside Metal declares the album "45 minutes of relentless, young and fresh energy, consisting if a couple of acoustic tracks."

== Track listing ==
All tracks are written by There for Tomorrow.

No.	Title	Length
1.	"To Whom It May Concern"	4:02
2.	"In His Words"	3:24
3.	"Your Mistake"	4:49
4.	"Red Handed"	4:16
5.	"Left All Alone"	4:40
6.	"Invisible Reality"	3:29
7.	"Faint Memory"	4:32
8.	"7th Day"	3:07
9.	"I Won't Die"	3:28
10.	"To Blame Another Being"	3:50
11.	"Hidden Hearts Are Hard to Find"	2:50
12.	"Point of Origin"	3:44
Total length:		46:52

== Personnel ==
There for Tomorrow

- Maika Maile – lead vocals, guitar, and programming
- James Flaherty – guitar, backing vocals
- Jay Enriquez – bass, backing vocals
- Christopher Kamrada – drums, samples

Technical personnel

- Lami Wolfgramm – producer
- LeRoy Wolfgramm – producer, recording, and engineer
- Tony Battaglia – mixing
- Michael Fuller – mastering
- Mark Ruffolo – assistant engineer
- Mark Mason – assistant engineer
- Alberto Mangual – string arrangements
- Kiti Maile – management
- Natasha Maile – management
- Daniel Keyes Furukawa II – artwork
- Don Mascheri – photography
