= Fortress (Miniature Tigers album) =

Studio album by Miniature Tigers
- Released: July 27, 2010
- Recorded: 2009-2010
- Genres: Indie pop Alternative rock Indie rock
- Length: 36:57
- Label: Modern Art
- Producers: Chris Chu, Neon Indian (Goldskull)

Miniature Tigers chronology
| Tell It to the Volcano (2008) | Fortress (2010) | Mia Pharaoh (2012) |

Professional ratings
Aggregate scores
| Source | Rating |
|---|---|
| Metacritic | 69/100 |
Review scores
| Source | Rating |
| Absolute Punk | 71% |
| AllMusic | 2.5/5 stars |
| The Boston Phoenix | 2.5/5 |
| EW | A− |
| Pitchfork | 6.4/10 |
| PopMatters | 6/10 |

Fortress (stylized as F O R T R E S S) is the Miniature Tigers' second full-length album. It was released on July 27, 2010.

== Track listing ==
1. "Mansion of Misery" – 3:36
2. "Rock N' Roll Mountain Troll" – 3:44
3. "Dark Tower" – 4:09
4. "Goldskull" – 2:36 (featuring Neon Indian)
5. "Bullfighter Jacket" – 3:21
6. "Egyptian Robe" – 5:29
7. "Japanese Woman Living In My Closet" – 1:58
8. "Tropical Birds" – 2:55
9. "Lolita" – 5:22
10. "Coyote Enchantment" – 3:51
