= Young Effectuals =

Studio album by The Helio Sequence
- Released: October 9, 2001
- Recorded: February – June 2001
- Genre: Alternative rock
- Length: 54:01
- Label: Cavity Search
- Producer: The Helio Sequence

The Helio Sequence chronology
Com Plex (2000)	Young Effectuals (2001)	Love and Distance (2004)

Young Effectuals is the second release from the Portland-based band The Helio Sequence. It was released on October 9, 2001, by Cavity Search Records. It is less pop-oriented than their later albums, and it features longer songs densely layered with synthesizers.

== Reception ==
Professional ratings
Review scores
Source	Rating
AllMusic	4/5 stars

In his review of the album for AllMusic, Richie Unterberger says the Helio Sequence combine "dense electric textures in which the voice is just another hazy element with atmospheric keyboards, guitar, and electronic effects", but that the songs eventually blur "together into similar overall moods as the disc progresses."

== Track listing ==
1. "Reh.Vuh.Lee" - 2:19
2. "Give, Give, Give" – 4:41
3. "(Square) Bubbles" – 5:57
4. "Knots" – 6:47
5. "The Echo-Blomp" – 4:44
6. "Nothing's Ok: Everything's Fine" – 4:54
7. "Cut The Camera" – 5:59
8. "Fall And Winter/Necktie Noose" – 6:04
9. "Kablerium Vs. Obliviousity" – 5:37
10. "Take, Take, Take" – 6:59

== Credits ==
- Christopher Cooper - Graphic design, visual arts
- John Eckenrode - Graphic design, visual arts
- The Helio Sequence - Producer, engineer, mixing
- Michael McGuire - Photography
- Brandon Summers - Guitar, vocals, graphic design, visual arts
- Benjamin Weikel - Drums, keyboards, vocals, engineer, mastering
- Juleah Weikel - Graphic design, visual arts
