= Keep Your Eyes Ahead =

Studio album by The Helio Sequence
- Released: January 29, 2008
- Recorded: November 2005 – April 2007
- Genre: Indie rock
- Length: 37:02
- Label: Sub Pop

The Helio Sequence chronology
Love and Distance (2004)	Keep Your Eyes Ahead (2008)	Negotiations (2012)

Professional ratings
Review scores
Source	Rating
AllMusic	3.5/5 stars
Pitchfork Media	(7.6/10)]
Ultimate Guitar	(7.7/10)

Keep Your Eyes Ahead is the fourth album from Portland-based band The Helio Sequence. It was released on January 29, 2008, by Sub Pop Records. The track "You Can Come To Me" samples sound effects from Super Mario Bros. 3.

The album peaked at #22 on the Billboard Top Heatseekers chart.

== Track listing ==
1. "Lately" – 4:10
2. "Can't Say No" – 3:32
3. "The Captive Mind" – 3:34
4. "You Can Come to Me" – 4:00
5. "Shed Your Love" – 3:18
6. "Keep Your Eyes Ahead" – 4:25
7. "Back to This" – 3:34
8. "Hallelujah" – 4:29
9. "Broken Afternoon" – 4:18
10. "No Regrets" – 1:42

== Bonus tracks ==
1. "Untitled 1" - 3:24
2. "Untitled 2" - 3:22
3. "Broken Afternoon (Alternate Version) - 4:04
