= There for Tomorrow (EP) =

There For Tomorrow

EP by There for Tomorrow
- Released: August 5, 2008
- Genres: Post-hardcore; alternative rock; pop punk
- Length: 25:15
- Label: Hopeless
- Producer: James Paul Wisner

There for Tomorrow chronology
Pages (EP) (2007)	There For Tomorrow (2008)	A Little Faster (2009)

Singles from There For Tomorrow (EP)
- 1. "Pages" Released: April 25, 2008

There For Tomorrow is the second EP by American rock band There for Tomorrow. It was released on August 5, 2008, through Hopeless Records. It was produced by James Paul Wisner and mixed by Adam Barber and David Bendeth.

Four of the previous tracks, "Addiction And Her Name", "Pages", "Waiting" and "Taking Chances" have been remixed and re-recorded since appearing on the band's previous EP, Pages. Along with the EP, a music video has been released for the song "No More Room To Breathe".

== Background and recording ==
After signing into Hopeless Records, the band started working with James Paul Wisner, Adam Barber, David Bendeth and Alan Douches for their second EP. Four of the previous tracks, "Addiction And Her Name", "Pages", "Waiting" and "Taking Chances" have been remixed and re-recorded since appearing on the band's previous EP, Pages.

There are some songs that would have made it in the EP. For example, Stories, Wish You Away, and Maika's Love Song (which is now Burn The Night Away). Of Course, they all made it to their next album "A Little Faster". And on June 30, they released a music video for "No More Room To Breathe".

== Reception ==
Professional ratings
Review scores
Source	Rating
AbsolutePunk.net	70% link
AllMusic	2.5/5 stars
Hybrid Magazine	Positive
Sputnikmusic	4/5 stars
Rockfreaks.net	7/10
Kill Your Stereo	4/4 stars

The EP received mixed to positive reviews, a review from Kill Your Stereo said "The combination of quality song-writing and a gifted vocalist is going to ensure TFT build themselves any army of fans over the next twelve months." Hybrid Magazine was also pleased with the EP "This is a time when the band really takes the chance to present a message. A message in the disguise of complex drums sequences."

Jo-Ann Greene of AllMusic was mixed with the effort but was impressed enough to compliment the EP " A perfect mix of neo-rock, indie pop, and punk."

Sputnikmusic was very happy with the EP "It is incredibly rare to find a group so young executing a record this well, but all of the signs just seem to add up. Each member has impressive individual talent and is able to express it with one another."

RockFreaks was optimistic "It's an EP with which TFT state "We know what the f*ck we're doing" in capital letters, as they seem to have read the book on writing catchy rock songs from cover to cover."

== Track listing ==
All tracks are written by There for Tomorrow.

No.	Title	Length
1.	"Deadlines"	3:21
2.	"Pages"	3:32
3.	"Waiting"	3:46
4.	"Remember When (Used to Be Used to It)"	3:53
5.	"No More Room to Breathe"	3:08
6.	"Addiction and Her Name"	3:08
7.	"Taking Chances"	4:28
Total length:		25:15

Deluxe Edition
No.	Title	Length
8.	"Pages (Acoustic)"	3:08

B-Sides
No.	Title	Length
1.	"Pages (AUDIO from Pages EP)"	3:32
2.	"Pages (Acoustic)"	3:08

== Personnel ==
There for Tomorrow

- Maika Maile – lead vocals, rhythm guitar, programming and engineer
- Christian Climer – lead guitar, backing vocals
- Jay Enriquez – bass, backing vocals
- Christopher Kamrada – drums, samples

Technical personnel

- James Paul Wisner – producer, engineer and mixing
- Alan Douches – mastering
- Adam Barber – mixing
- David Bendeth – mixing (track 4)
- Chris Gill – engineer
- Stuart Westphal – engineer
- Robert Columbus – drum technician
- Oxen – artwork
- Gage Young – photography
