= The Helio Sequence =

American indie rock duo

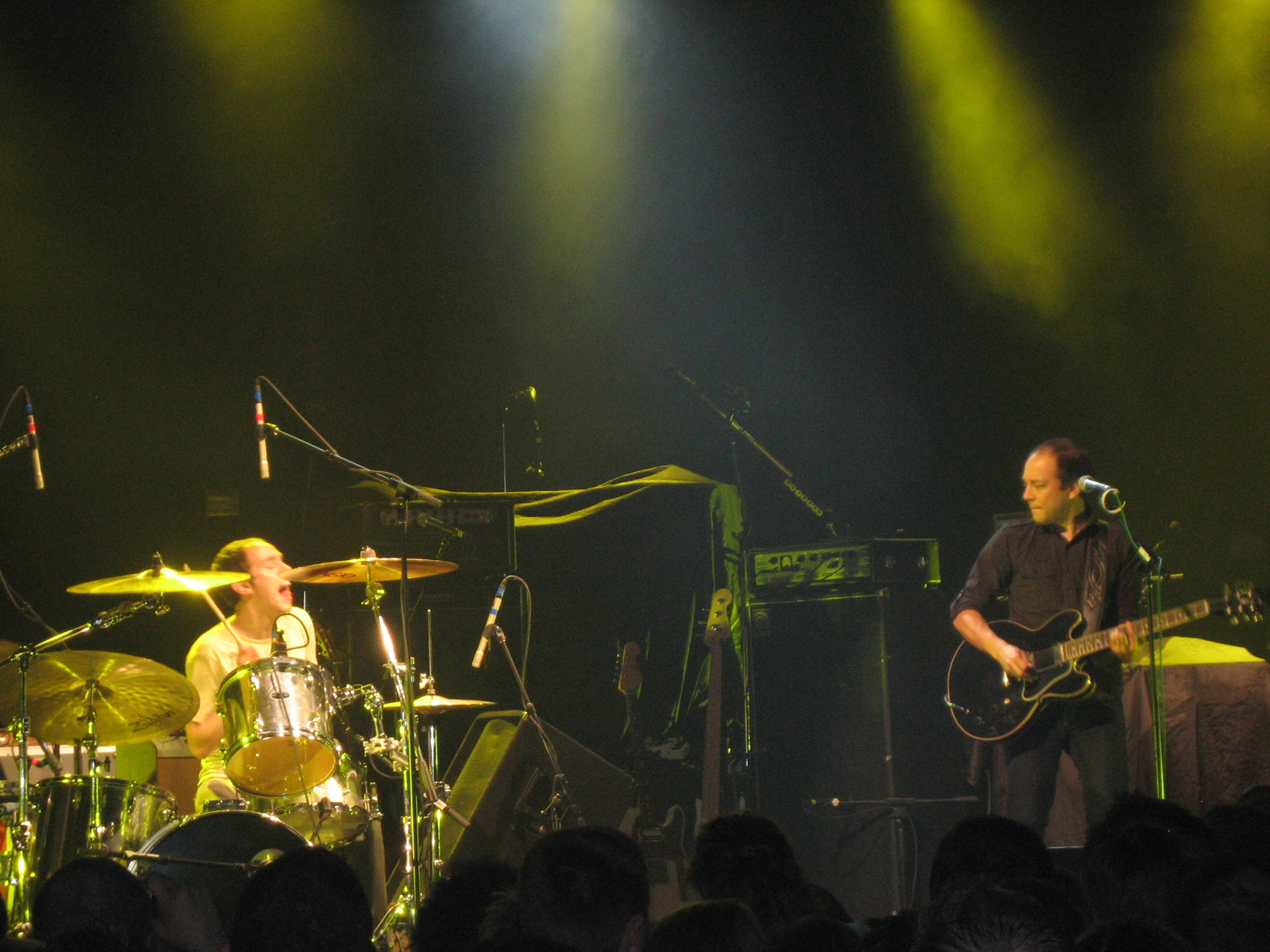

Background information
- Origin: Beaverton, Oregon
- Genre: Indie rock
- Years active: 1999–present
- Labels: Sub Pop, Cavity Search
- Members: Brandon Summers; Benjamin Weikel
- Website: heliosequence.com

The Helio Sequence is an American indie rock duo from Beaverton, Oregon, signed to Sub Pop. The band consists of Brandon Summers on vocals and guitars and Benjamin Weikel on drums and keyboards.

== History ==
Summers and Weikel formed The Helio Sequence in 1999, and played their first show in Portland at the Mount Tabor Theater.

The band has released three albums on Sub Pop, two on the Portland-based label Cavity Search and a self-released EP. Their fifth album, entitled Negotiations, was released on September 11, 2012, on Sub Pop.

The Helio Sequence toured the United States with the British band Keane in 2009, and in June 2010, they were Keane's support act in several gigs through Great Britain during the band's Night Train Tour. In September 2013, The Helio Sequence again toured the United States, this time co-headlining with Menomena.

For their 2015 self-titled album The Helio Sequence, the band revamped the process in which they created their music. They wrote 26 songs which they sent to friends, asking them to list their favorite ten songs. Using the responses, by the end of June 2014 the band had compiled a list of ten songs for the album. The album received generally favorable reviews, with Eric Swedlund of Paste Magazine calling it a "career-defining album". Others, such as Adam Kivel of Consequence of Sound claimed that "it’s [the album] a reset of the odometer rather than a definitive statement of destination." They announced a tour in support of the album, beginning on April 14, 2015, in Portland and winding up on June 27, 2015, in St. Paul, Minnesota.

In September and October 2017, The Helio Sequence toured the U.S., performing 29 dates as the opening band for Australian rock band The Church.

== Band members ==
=== Brandon Summers ===
Summers is responsible for the lyrics, lead vocals, guitar, and shares production credits with Weikel. Prior to the release of their 2008 album Keep Your Eyes Ahead, Summers lost his voice, but he regained it before their newest release. The band's sound evolved on Keep Your Eyes Ahead, due in part to Summers damaging his vocal cords and then relearning to sing. On prior albums he can be heard also playing the harmonica on several tracks from their 2004 release, Love and Distance.

=== Benjamin Weikel ===
Benjamin Weikel grew up in Beaverton, Oregon, where he worked with Summers at the local music store. As well as playing drums and keyboard for The Helio Sequence, and taking part in production, Weikel also recorded with the band Modest Mouse, drumming on their platinum-selling record Good News for People Who Love Bad News, and later their record No One's First, and You're Next in 2009. This led to the Helio Sequence and Modest Mouse touring together at one point. He also recorded with Ramona Falls for their 2009 album Intuit.

== Discography ==
- Accelerated Slow Motion Cinema (EP) (1999)
- Com Plex (2000)
- Young Effectuals (2001)
- Love and Distance (2004)
- Keep Your Eyes Ahead (2008)
- Heliomena "Converter" (split 7-inch with Menomena) (2010)
- Negotiations (2012)
- The Helio Sequence (2015)
