= Negotiations (The Helio Sequence album) =

Studio album by The Helio Sequence
- Released: September 11, 2012
- Genre: Indie rock
- Length: 43:02
- Label: Sub Pop

The Helio Sequence chronology
Keep Your Eyes Ahead (2008)	Negotiations (2012)	The Helio Sequence (2015)

Negotiations is the fifth full-length album by the Beaverton, Oregon-based band The Helio Sequence, and their third release on US label Sub Pop. It was released on September 11, 2012. On May 1, 2020, the band released Aces: A Quadrophonic Surround Companion for Negotiations which was meant to be played simultaneously with Negotiations for "an enhanced spatial experience".

== Track listing ==
No.	Title	Length
1.	"One More Time"	3:45
2.	"October"	4:38
3.	"Downward Spiral"	3:47
4.	"The Measure"	3:19
5.	"Hall of Mirrors"	3:44
6.	"Harvester of Souls"	3:40
7.	"Open Letter"	4:21
8.	"When the Shadow Falls"	3:44
9.	"Silence on Silence"	3:56
10.	"December"	3:24
11.	"Negotiations"	4:44

iTunes bonus track
No.	Title	Length
12.	"Skyline"	3:08
