= Identity on Fire =

Studio album by A Skylit Drive
- Released: February 15, 2011
- Recorded: July–October 2010, @ Maple Studios, Orange County, California
- Genre: Post-hardcore, screamo, metalcore
- Length: 41:16
- Label: Fearless, Hassle
- Producer: Cameron Webb

A Skylit Drive chronology
Adelphia (2009)	Identity on Fire (2011)	Rise (2013)

Singles from Identity on Fire
- 1. "XO Skeleton" Released: January 10, 2011; 2. "Too Little Too Late" Released: January 24, 2011; 3. "Ex Marks the Spot" Released: February 15, 2011

Identity on Fire is the third studio album by American post-hardcore band A Skylit Drive, released on February 15, 2011.

== Production and recording ==
On his Formspring account, Jagmin predicted that A Skylit Drive would begin writing and recording a follow-up to Adelphia during Summer 2010. He also suggested that the album would see an early 2011 release.

In February 2010, Hassle Records published on their web site, "We have new recruits to the Hassle Records family, please welcome A Skylit Drive with open arms... Fresh out of California, A Skylit Drive have been together in their current line-up since 2007 and have been touring their unique brand of metalcore across the US. We released their second album Adelphia in October and the UK joined the ever growing A Skylit Drive bandwagon. Catch the band on the rapidly selling out UK / Europe tour with Alesana in April."

The band announced via MySpace that on May 29, 2010, the band Desires of Sires will debut on their Adelphia tour. Recently, Michael Jagmin hinted on Twitter that A Skylit Drive is currently writing new material. A Skylit Drive is recording new demos. The band's MySpace layout changed in July 2010 with a new message saying that A Skylit Drive was in the studio recording a new album with Cameron Webb for early 2011.

According to the band's Twitter account, they finished recording the new album. According to Nick Miller's Twitter, a twitpic of a promotional poster confirmed the album's name Identity On Fire, which was set to be released sometime in February 2011.

On November 15, 2010, the band revealed cover art from the album and confirmed the production for Cameron Webb (Silverstein, Flyleaf, 30 Seconds To Mars).

The first song revealed from the album was "Ex Marks the Spot". Michael Jagmin considered it his favorite song off the album. On December 7, 2010, the band announced the track listing for the album and a date set on February 15, 2011. On January 5, 2011 via Twitter, Michael Jagmin announced a new song coming out on January 11. "XO Skeleton" was released online January 11 on the band's Facebook page.

The second single and music video for "Too Little Too Late" premiered on January 24 on iTunes. The third official single "Ex Marks the Spot" was released the same day as the album, February 15. The song was made available for download in the Rock Band Network on Xbox 360 for 160 Microsoft Points. It features vocal harmonies and pro keys.

On February 10 the album began streaming on PureVolume.com.

The album debuted at number 98 on the Billboard 200.

It's the last album to feature original lead guitarist Joey Wilson, who left the band in 2012.

== Track listing ==
All lyrics written by Michael Jagmin and Nick Miller.

No.	Title	Length
1.	"Carry the Broken"	1:23
2.	"Too Little Too Late"	3:11
3.	"XO Skeleton"	3:31
4.	"Conscience Is a Killer"	3:55
5.	"Ex Marks the Spot"	4:35
6.	"The Cali Buds"	3:38
7.	"Your Mistake"	3:48
8.	"Fuck the System"	2:57
9.	"500 Days of Bummer"	4:22
10.	"Tempt Me, Temptation"	3:29
11.	"Identity on Fire"	4:18
12.	"If You Lived Here You'd Be Home"	4:10
Total length:		41:16

iTunes Edition Bonus Tracks
No.	Title	Length
13.	"Black and Blue"	2:14
14.	"400 Foot Robots"	3:43
15.	"Too Little Too Late" (Music Video)	3:14

== Charts ==
Charts	Peak position
US Billboard 200	98
US Independent Albums (Billboard)	15
US Top Rock Albums (Billboard)	26
US Top Alternative Albums (Billboard)	16

== Personnel ==
A Skylit Drive

- Michael "Jag" Jagmin - clean vocals
- Brian White - unclean vocals, bass
- Joey Wilson - lead guitar
- Nick Miller - rhythm guitar
- Kyle Simmons - keyboards, programming
- Cory La Quay - drums, backing unclean vocals

Production

- Produced & mixed by Cameron Webb, @ Maple Studios, Orange County, California
- Engineered by Cameron Webb & Sergio Chavez
- Mastered by Alan Douches, @ West West Side Music, New Windsor, New York
- A&R by Shervon Esfahani
- Management by Eric Rushing & Shawn Carrano (The Artery Foundation)
- Artwork by Phill Mamula
- Symbol designed by Skull With Hair
- Band photo by Brook Pifer
