= She Watched the Sky =

She Watched The Sky

EP by A Skylit Drive
- Released: January 23, 2007
- Recorded: 2006
- Genre: Post-hardcore, emo, screamo
- Length: 29:05
- Label: Tragic Hero
- Producer: Kit Walters

A Skylit Drive chronology
She Watched The Sky (2007)	Wires...and the Concept of Breathing (2008)

She Watched The Sky is the first EP by the American post-hardcore band A Skylit Drive. It was released on January 23, 2007, on Tragic Hero Records. It is their only release with vocalist Jordan Blake. A music video directed by Brianna Campbell was made for the track, "Drown the City". In the video, A Skylit Drive is seen at a club and playing the song in a parking lot.

== Track listing ==
No.	Title	Length
1.	"Ability to Create a War"	1:29
2.	"Drown the City"	4:47
3.	"The All Star Diaries"	4:12
4.	"Hey Nightmare, Where Did You Get Them Teeth?"	4:57
5.	"The Past, the Love, the Memory"	3:00
6.	"A Reason for Broken Wings"	4:30
7.	"According to Columbus"	4:28
Total length:		21:43

== Personnel ==
She Watched the Sky album personnel as listed on Allmusic.

A Skylit Drive

- Jordan Blake – lead vocals
- Joey Wilson – lead guitar
- Nick Miller – rhythm guitar
- Brian White – bass guitar, backing unclean vocals
- Cory La Quay – drums, backing unclean vocals
- Kyle Simmons – keyboards, programming
