= There for Tomorrow =

American rock band

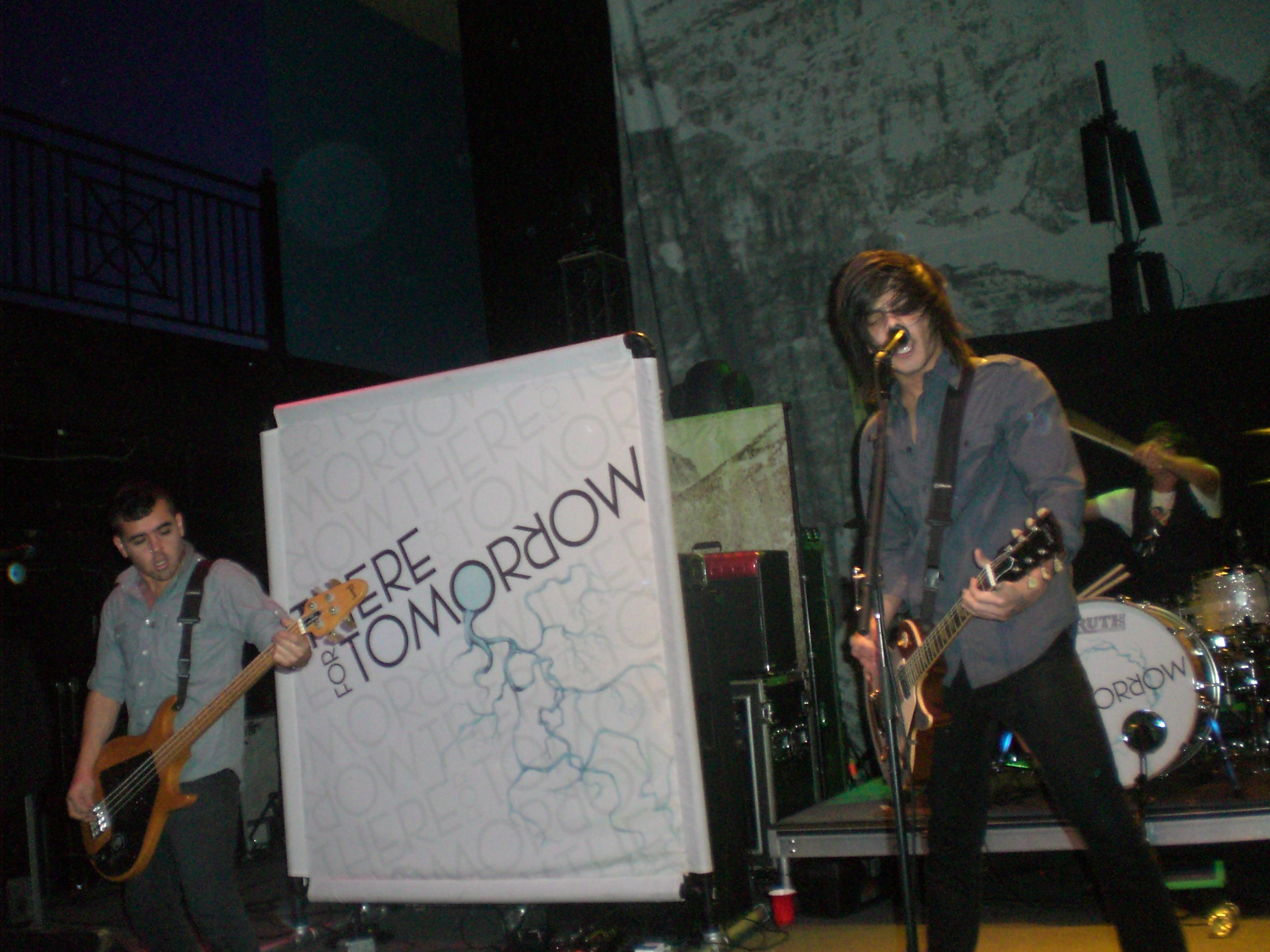
- There For Tomorrow performing in 2008. Left to Right: Jay Enriquez, Maika Maile, and Chris Kamrada

Background information
- Also known as: The Kick Off (2003–2004)
- Origin: Orlando, Florida, U.S.
- Genres: Alternative rock; pop-punk; post-hardcore; emo
- Years active: 2003–2014, 2019, 2020
- Labels: Hopeless; WP
- Past members: Maika Maile; Chris Kamrada; Christian Climer; Jay Enriquez; James Flaherty

There for Tomorrow was an American rock band formed in Orlando, Florida, in February 2003. The original group consisted of vocalist Maika Maile, drummer Chris Kamrada, guitarist James Flaherty and bassist Jay Enriquez. Christian Climer joined the band in 2006 when the band was looking for a new member after Flaherty left in 2005.

On November 19, 2014, the band released a statement saying that they were disbanding and that they have been "trying to find themselves as individuals" after slowing things down in 2012. They played two final shows in their home city of Orlando in December 2014.

In late 2015, Maika Maile and Chris Kamrada began collaborating on a new musical project called Afterhour (stylized as AFTRHR). The duo continued the indie direction they had introduced on the Nightscape EP.

On November 29, 2019, the band made a reunion show for a 10-year anniversary of A Little Faster.

On May 21, 2020, the band made a show livestream for celebrating 10 years of A Little Faster.

== History ==
=== Early years, formation and the Kick Off (2003) ===
There for Tomorrow was formed when the members were teenagers in high school just before Maika Maile's father and sister died. At the time of their formation, the band consisted of Maile on lead vocals and rhythm guitar, James Flaherty on lead guitar and backing vocals, Jay Enriquez on bass and backing vocals, and Chris Kamrada on drums and samples.

Maile received his love for music from his father, a former professional singer. Since the age of six, Maile attended family and school events to show his talent on the guitar. Flaherty got into guitar though Enriquez. The band was originally called the Kick Off (a.k.a. TKO), because they were "kicking off" as a new band, but after playing numerous local shows, the band soon changed their name due to copyright issues.

Enriquez suggested the name "There For Tomorrow" and the others agreed. They posted the name on their website. The band soon signed into WP Records (Fatai, Leilani, and Jett17) in 2003. In the same year, the band showcased short demos of "I Won't Die" and "Your Mistake" in the WP Records' website. They even had Maile's relatives (Kiti Maile and Natasha Maile) to help, they had a small company where they would "help artists to develop and establish a career in the music industry" called KeeTash Entertainment.

Their album was planned to be released in March 2004 but got delayed possibly because the album was still in the final stages of being manufactured.

=== Point of Origin and Pages (2004–2007) ===
The band released their debut album Point of Origin on April 30, 2004, on WP Records. On the same day, the band had a release party celebrating the hard work the band had made, selling the CD for $10. The band said they were working on an EP in 2005 on their website. On November 28 next year, the band announced that James Flaherty was leaving for "undisclosed reasons". The band lost their label after WP Records went defunct in 2005 and Keetash Entertainment also went inactive in 2006.

The band was a trio for some time although they were looking for recruits. In 2006, Christian Climer joined the band and their music began playing on a local radio station. They performed showcase concerts which led to stints on the southeastern leg of the Vans Warped Tour in 2007. After that, they met with James Paul Wisner (Underoath, and Paramore), who produced their 2007 Pages EP, which attracted the attention of the alternative rock label Hopeless Records. The band shot a music video for the single "Pages", directed by Chris Grieder.

=== Self-titled EP and A Little Faster (2008–2010) ===
After signing onto Hopeless Records in 2008, Wisner returned to produce the band's self-titled EP, which was released on August 5, 2008. It featured the first single "No More Room to Breathe", which the band shot a music video for, and the second single "Pages". Just over three months later, the band won the MTVU Woodie Award for breakout artist of the year, beating established acts such as All Time Low and We the Kings.

In February 2009, the band joined We the Kings and other bands on the Secret Valentine Tour, then later on the 2009 Warped Tour playing local shows. On June 9, 2009, There for Tomorrow's second full-length album was released by Hopeless Records, titled A Little Faster. The title song from the album was featured in the film Ben 10: Alien Swarm, along with a music video of the band performing, interspersed with scenes from the film. The song was also featured in promotional commercials and videos for Nerf's Vortex during 2011 which showed an acoustic version of the song. The band took part in the Take Action Tour in the winter of 2010, along with bands such as Mayday Parade and A Rocket to the Moon.

=== Re:Creations and The Verge (2010–2013) ===
In an interview during July 2010, Maile announced the band's plans to release a remix EP in the fall as well as tour one last time before the band began recording its next album. The remix EP, Re:Creations, was released on October 19, 2010. It featured several remixes as well as two new songs, "Small World" (which the band also made a remix for) and "Soul Full Solace (interlude)" which 5 of the songs reappeared in their "A Little Faster" Deluxe Edition.

The band's third album, The Verge, was produced by Michael Elvis Baskette (Falling In Reverse, Blessthefall, and Story of the Year) and mixed by Dave Holdredge, which was released on June 28, 2011, while the band was touring on the Vans Warped Tour. Before the album's release, the band stated that The Verge would “sound bad" in the best ways possible.” The band wrote and recorded the album in one month. They had originally written thirteen songs over the course of a week; only the first twelve songs made it on the album. "Hunt Hunt Hunt," the first single from the album and was released on February 28 and later "The Joyride" on June 28, 2011, the same day of the album. A documentary on the record was released along with the album, featuring 4 live studio sessions, choreographed and directed by Chris Grieder. Maile stated in a 2011 Warped Tour interview that his favorite song off The Verge was "BLU", due to the fact that it is the band's first ballad and the piano as the lead instrument for the first time.

The band played every date on the Vans Warped Tour 2011. In 2012, they recorded and released a new demo, "Road to Nowhere", which was featured in the 2012 promotional commercials for Nerf's Vortex. The band joined the 2012 "Beyond the Blue" tour in Japan, along with acts like Mayday Parade, Every Avenue and singer William Beckett.

There for Tomorrow announced their first headlining tour, taking place in the autumn of 2012, as well as a United Kingdom/Europe tour, also in the fall. The headlining tour started on September 14, 2012, along with the bands Set It Off and Divided by Friday, and ended on October 7 of the same year, while the UK/Europe tour lasted eight days, beginning November 8 with Deaf Havana and Canterbury.

On May 21, 2013, There for Tomorrow announced that they would be playing the Next Generation Fest in São Paulo, Brazil on July 27, alongside Young Guns, All Time Low, 3OH!3, Breathe Carolina, and Rocky Loves Emily. On July 19, the Next Generation Fest announced that it had to be delayed four months due to unexpected circumstances, making the festival scheduled around December 2013.

=== Nightscape EP, breakup, and A F T R H R (2014–2019) ===
On December 26, 2013, the band released a video announcing the release of a new album in January 2014. The band later released a statement explaining that the album would be delayed due to several setbacks. The band then released a single from the upcoming album, Dark Purple Sky on iTunes. It was met with mixed to positive reviews, reviewers noting that the new track had elements resembling a Thirty Seconds to Mars or U2 track. On May 14, 2014, the band released another single from their upcoming EP, titled Racing Blood. In June 2014 the band officially announced that a new EP, Nightscape, would be released in October 2014.

On November 19, the band posted a statement officially announcing the end of the band saying "trying to find themselves as individuals". They played their farewell shows during December 2014 in their hometown in Orlando.

One year after the breakup, Maile and Kamrada, who had been the primary performers on the Nightscape EP, began collaborating with Sebastian Metzgar, a freelance composer from the US they contracted, forming a duet band called A F T R H R. On Christmas Eve 2015, they released a new single, So Divine. 5 months later, they released a second single Perfect. On January 13, 2017, they released a third single Walking on Air. All three singles retained the stylistic change that they introduced on Nightscape EP. On April 10, 2019, AFTRHR released their EP 'Closing In' which had a total of five tracks including: Closing In, All Night, Drifting, Don't Give A, Blooms.

=== Reunions and future (2019–present) ===
On November 29, 2019, There for Tomorrow reunited for a one-off reunion show at The Beacham in Orlando, Florida, to celebrate the 10 year anniversary of their album A Little Faster. On May 21, 2020, amidst the COVID-19 pandemic, the band announced another one-off performance over a livestream on June 9 of that year.

== Musical style ==
The band's label described them in 2003 as "a new flavor of Hard Core Punk".

== Former members ==
- Maika Maile – lead vocals, rhythm guitar, bass, piano, production (2003–2014, 2019)
- Christopher Kamrada – drums, percussion (2003–2014, 2019)
- Christian Climer – lead guitar, backing vocals (2005–2014, 2019)
- Jay Enriquez – bass, backing vocals (2003–2014, 2019)
- James Flaherty – lead guitar, backing vocals (2003–2005)

== Discography ==
=== Studio albums ===
Year	Album details	Peak chart positions		
Year	Album details	US	US Indie	US Heat.
2004	Point of Origin: Released: April 30, 2004; Label: WP	—	—	—
2009	A Little Faster: Released: June 9, 2009; Label: Hopeless	181	37	9
2011	The Verge: Released: June 28, 2011; Label: Hopeless	–	–	14

=== Extended plays ===
Year	Album details	Peak chart positions		
Year	Album details	US	US Indie	US Heat.
2007	Pages: Released: March 27, 2007; Label: Self-Released	—	—	—
2008	There for Tomorrow: Released: August 5, 2008; Label: Hopeless	—	—	16
2010	Re:Creations: Released: October 19, 2010; Label: Hopeless	—	—	—
2014	Nightscape: Release date: October 21, 2014; Label: Self-released	—	—	—
"—" denotes a release that did not chart.
