= Tell It to the Volcano =

Studio album by Miniature Tigers
- Released: September 16, 2008
- Genre: Indie pop, pop rock
- Length: 29:10
- Label: Modern Art
- Producer: Back Ted N-Ted

Miniature Tigers chronology
Black Magic EP (2008)	Tell It to the Volcano (2008)	Fortress (2010)

Professional ratings
Review scores
Source	Rating
Alternative Press	4.5/5 stars
AllMusic	4/5 stars
AbsolutePunk	82%
PopMatters	7/10 stars
Prefix	8/10
The Tune	A-

Tell It to the Volcano is the debut album by the indie pop band Miniature Tigers, released on September 16, 2008.

== Track listing ==
All songs written by Charlie Brand.

1. "Cannibal Queen" – 2:42
2. "Like or Like Like" – 2:37
3. "Dino Damage" – 2:22
4. "Tell It to the Volcano" – 2:33
5. "Hot Venom" – 2:49
6. "Tchaikovsky & Solitude" – 3:03
7. "The Wolf" – 2:34
8. "Giraffe" – 2:01
9. "Annie Oakley" – 3:09
10. "Haunted Pyramid" – 1:55
11. "Last Night's Fake Blood" – 3:33
