= Miniature Tigers =

American indie pop band

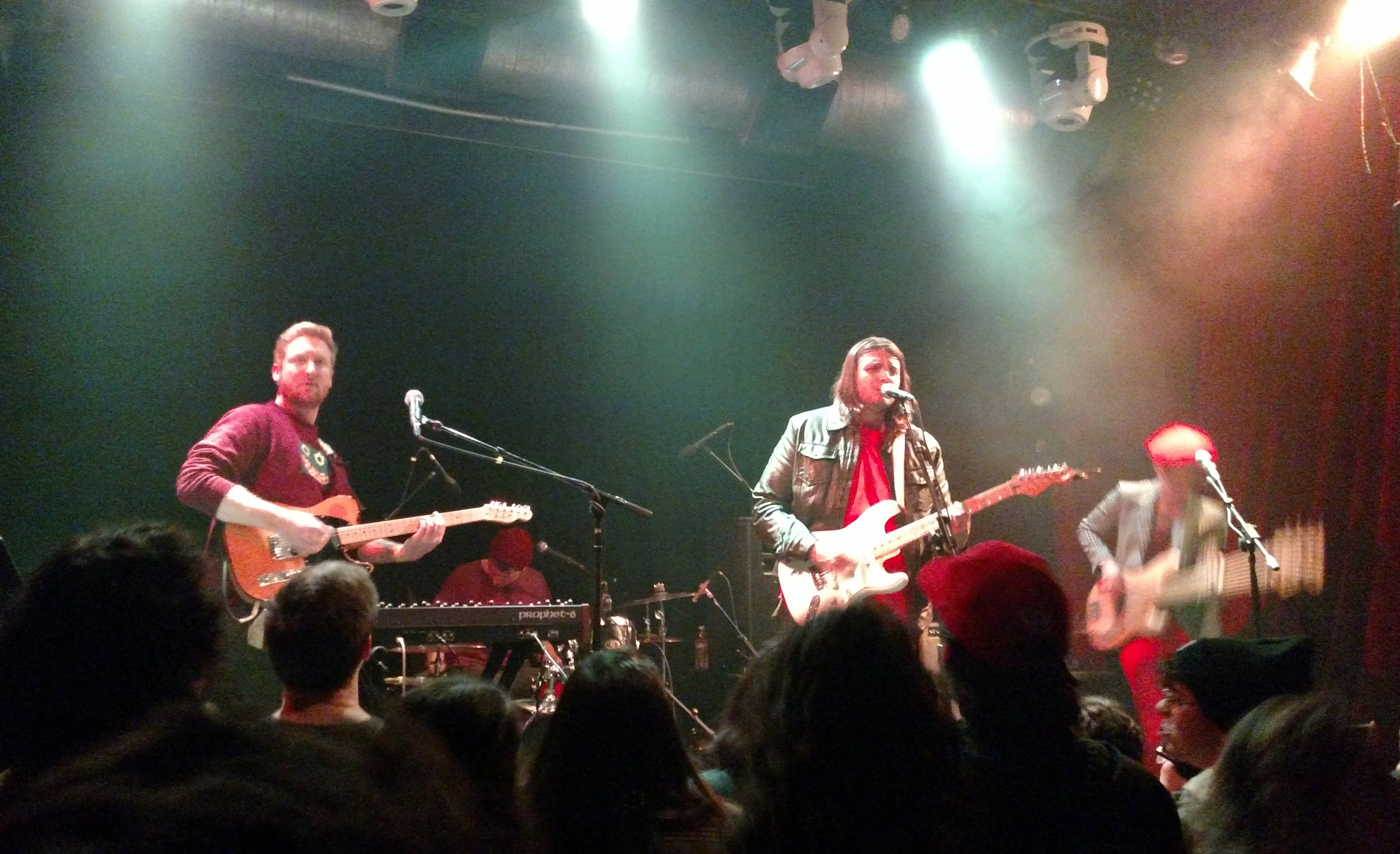
- Miniature Tigers performing in San Francisco in 2020

Background information
- Origin: Phoenix, Arizona, United States
- Genres: Indie pop, indie rock
- Years active: 2006–present
- Label: YEBO
- Members: Charlie Brand; Rick Alvin Schaier; Ryan Breen; Brandon Lee
- Past members: Alex Gerber; Algernon Quashie; Eli Brandom; Golie Zarabi; Dave Weingarten; Susan Spruce; Darren Robinson
- Website: Official site

Miniature Tigers is an American indie pop band based in Brooklyn that combines elements of indie rock, synth-pop, and dream pop. The band is made up of Charlie Brand (lead vocals, guitar), Rick Schaier (keyboards and guitar), Algernon Quashie (guitar), and Brandon Lee (bass guitar).

Miniature Tigers was formed when Charlie Brand met Rick Schaier over Myspace in 2006. They began their first national tour in October 2008, which included playing a set at the 2008 CMJ Music Marathon. Miniature Tigers toured with Ben Folds in February and played the 2009 Monolith Festival in September. They also toured with Fun. in support of their latest album, Some Nights.

== Media ==
In December 2006, Rolling Stone listed Miniature Tigers as "one of the 25 best bands on Myspace." The band has also received favorable attention from Spin magazine, which included Miniature Tigers in its list of "The 9 Hottest New Bands Playing CMJ 2008." Death + Taxes, a music magazine, awarded the band's Black Magic and White Magic EPs 4 stars, calling the band "terribly endearing." The music video for "Cannibal Queen" has been featured on mtvU and MTV2's Subterranean.

The band's 4th album Cruel Runnings was released June 17, 2014 with cover art inspired by Memphis Group.

The band contributed music to and appear in the 2015 romantic comedy Sleeping with Other People.

== Discography ==
=== Studio albums ===
- Tell It to the Volcano (September 16, 2008)
- Fortress (July 27, 2010)
- Mia Pharaoh (March 6, 2012)
- Cruel Runnings (June 17, 2014)
- I Dreamt I Was a Cowboy (October 28, 2016)
- Fortress (Demos) (January 12, 2018)
- Vampires in the Daylight (October 11, 2019)
- Miniature Tigers (January 27, 2023)
- Volcano Demos and B-Sides (March 31, 2026)
- Summer of the Cow (June 5, 2026)

=== Extended plays ===
- Miniature Tigers (October, 2005)
- Octopus (June 27, 2006)
- White Magic (March 4, 2008)
- Black Magic (March 4, 2008)
