= Adelphia (album) =

Studio album by A Skylit Drive
- Released: June 9, 2009
- Recorded: Seattle, WA
- Genre: Melodic hardcore, post-hardcore, screamo
- Length: 43:30
- Label: Fearless
- Producer: Casey Bates

A Skylit Drive chronology
Wires...and the Concept of Breathing (2008)	Adelphia (2009)	Identity on Fire (2011)

Singles from Adelphia
- 1. "Those Cannons Could Sink a Ship!" Released: May 26, 2009

Professional ratings
Review scores
Source	Rating
AbsolutePunk	78%
AllMusic	3.5/5 stars
Rain City Ambience	(7/10)
Rock Sound	8/10 stars

Adelphia is the second studio album by American post-hardcore band A Skylit Drive and the first on Fearless Records. It was released on June 9, 2009. The album peaked at 64 on the Billboard 200 as well as number 11 on the Top Independent Albums.

== Track listing ==
All lyrics written by Michael Jagmin and Nick Miller.

No.	Title	Length
1.	"Prelude to a Dream"	3:29
2.	"Those Cannons Could Sink a Ship"	3:36
3.	"Heaven"	3:38
4.	"Running with the Light"	3:51
5.	"Eva the Carrier"	3:43
6.	"Worlds End in Whispers, Not Bangs (Interlude)"	1:26
7.	"The Boy Without a Demon"	4:05
8.	"Thank God It's Cloudy Because I'm Allergic to Sunlight"	3:28
9.	"Air the Enlightenment"	2:29
10.	"The Children of Adelphia"	3:01
11.	"I Swear This Place Is Haunted"	3:45
12.	"It's Not Ironic, It's Obvious"	3:41
13.	"See You Around"	3:23
Total length:		43:30

== Personnel ==
A Skylit Drive

- Michael "Jag" Jagmin - clean vocals
- Brian White - unclean vocals, bass
- Joey Wilson - lead guitar
- Nick Miller - rhythm guitar
- Kyle Simmons - keyboards, programming
- Cory La Quay - drums, backing unclean vocals

Artwork and design

- Kevin Knight – Art direction, photography

Production and recording

- Casey Bates - Producer, engineering
- Alan Douches - Mastering
- Machine - Mixing
- Will Putney - Mixing, assistant engineering

== Chart positions ==
Chart (2008)	Peak position
US Billboard 200	64
US Top Internet Albums	11
US Top Independent Albums	64
