= ASD (album) =

Studio album by A Skylit Drive
- Released: October 9, 2015
- Recorded: January–June 2015
- Studio: Adelaide Studios, North Carolina
- Genre: Post-hardcore, metalcore, alternative metal
- Length: 38:50
- Label: Tragic Hero
- Producer: Kit Walters

A Skylit Drive chronology
Rise (2013)	ASD (2015)

Singles from ASD
- 1. "Bring Me a War" Released: August 21, 2015; 2. "Falling Apart in a (Crow)ded Room" Released: September 18, 2015

ASD is the fifth and final studio album by American post-hardcore band A Skylit Drive, released on October 9, 2015, through Tragic Hero Records.

It is the only studio album without bassist and unclean vocalist, Brian White, and founding drummer and backing vocalist, Cory La Quay, who both left the band in 2014. They were replaced by Michael Labelle on guitar/unclean vocals and Brandon "Rage" Richter on drums, respectively, while keyboardist Kyle Simmons took over the bass.

== Track listing ==
All lyrics written by Michael Jagmin, Nick Miller, Michael Labelle and Kit Walters, music by A Skylit Drive.

No.	Title	Length
1.	"Bring Me a War"	3:42
2.	"Self/Less"	2:49
3.	"Falling Apart in a (Crow)ded Room"	3:47
4.	"Shock My Heart"	4:00
5.	"Risk It All"	3:14
6.	"Running in Circles"	3:41
7.	"Oblivion"	2:54
8.	"Symphony of Broken Dreams"	3:28
9.	"I'll Sleep When I'm Dead"	3:27
10.	"Find a Way"	3:57
11.	"The Son Is Not the Father"	3:51
Total length:		38:50

== Personnel ==
- Michael "Jag" Jagmin - clean vocals
- Nick Miller - lead guitar
- Michael Labelle - rhythm guitar, unclean vocals
- Kyle Simmons - bass, keyboards, programming
- Brandon "Rage" Richter - drums, percussion

== Charts ==
Chart (2015)	Peak position
US Billboard 200	59
US Independent Albums (Billboard)	7
US Top Alternative Albums (Billboard)	6
US Top Rock Albums (Billboard)	6
US Top Hard Rock Albums (Billboard)	3
