= Rise (A Skylit Drive album) =

Studio album by A Skylit Drive
- Released: September 24, 2013
- Recorded: June 2013, at Chango Studios, Lake Mary, Florida and Crushtone Studios, Cleveland, Ohio
- Genre: Post-hardcore; alternative rock
- Length: 40:49
- Label: Tragic Hero
- Producer: Cameron Mizell

A Skylit Drive chronology
Identity on Fire (2011)	Rise (2013)	ASD (2015)

Singles from Rise
- 1. "Rise" Released: July 31, 2013

Rise is the fourth studio album by American post-hardcore band A Skylit Drive. The album was released on September 24, 2013, through Tragic Hero Records. The first single and title track of the album, "Rise", was released on July 31, 2013. The full track listing was revealed on August 14, 2013. Rise peaked at 41 on the Billboard 200. A lyric video for the track "Unbreakable" was released on September 6, 2013. On February 21, 2014, the music video for the song "Crazy" was released as well. On June 26, 2014, an acoustic performance video for the song "Rise" was released. It's the first album without guitarist Joey Wilson and the last to feature bassist and unclean vocalist, Brian White, and founding drummer and backing vocalist, Cory La Quay, who both left the band in 2014.

== Track listing ==
All lyrics written by Michael Jagmin and Nick Miller.

No.	Title	Length
1.	"Save Me Tragedy"	3:12
2.	"Unbreakable"	3:31
3.	"Crash Down"	3:15
4.	"Rise"	3:15
5.	"Crazy"	2:59
6.	"Said & Done"	3:40
7.	"Just Stay"	4:16
8.	"Pendulum"	3:20
9.	"I, Enemy"	3:01
10.	"Wide Awake"	3:23
11.	"Shadows"	3:40
12.	"Dreaming in Blue"	3:09
Total length:		40:49

iTunes Deluxe Edition bonus tracks
No.	Title	Length
13.	"Fallen"	3:26
14.	"Rise" (Demo)	3:15
15.	"Just Stay" (Demo)	4:22
16.	"Crazy" (Demo)	3:04

On the physical Deluxe Edition of the album, only 3 bonus tracks were included. The only one that never went to the physical release was the demo version of Crazy.

== Personnel ==
A Skylit Drive

- Michael "Jag" Jagmin - clean vocals, backing unclean vocals on tracks 2, 3, 4 and 5
- Brian White - bass, unclean vocals, backing clean vocals on track 7 and 8
- Nick Miller - lead guitar
- Kyle Simmons - rhythm guitar, keyboards, programming
- Cory LaQuay - drums, backing unclean vocals

Production

- Produced by Cameron Mizell
- Engineered by Jim Wirt, Kit Waters & Mitchel Marllow, @ Crushtone Studios, Cleveland, Ohio
- Management by Joey Simmrin (Rebellion Noise)
- Publicity by Jesea Lee
- Booking by Ash Avildsen (The Pantheon Agency)
- Layout & design by Aaron Marsh
- Cover photo by Matt Burke
- Model: Alexandra Kees

== Charts ==
Chart (2013)	Peak position
US Billboard 200	41
US Independent Albums (Billboard)	4
US Top Alternative Albums (Billboard)	7
US Top Rock Albums (Billboard)	12
