= Wires...and the Concept of Breathing =

Wires and the Concept of Breathing

Studio album by A Skylit Drive
- Released: May 21, 2008
- Studios: Warrior Sound, Raleigh, North Carolina
- Genres: Post-hardcore; metalcore; screamo; emo
- Length: 36:22
- Label: Tragic Hero
- Producers: Mitch Marlow; Al Jacob; Jamie King; Kit Walters

A Skylit Drive chronology
She Watched the Sky (2007)	Wires and the Concept of Breathing (2008)	Adelphia (2009)

Professional ratings
Review scores
Source	Rating
AbsolutePunk.net	66%

Wires and the Concept of Breathing is the debut studio album by American post-hardcore band A Skylit Drive. The album was released on May 21, 2008, on Tragic Hero Records. This is the band's first album to feature vocalist Michael Jagmin, who joined the band in 2008.

The band released music videos for five of the tracks: "Wires (and the Concept of Breathing)", "This Isn't the End", "Knights of the Round", "All It Takes for Your Dreams to Come True" and "I'm Not a Thief, I'm a Treasure Hunter". All five music videos were included on the Let Go of the Wires DVD along with interviews and the band's performance at the Glasshouse from September 21, 2008. Let Go of the Wires was released on December 9, 2008, through Tragic Hero.

== Musical style ==
Wires and the Concept of Breathing was described by AllMusic as a post-hardcore, emo, and screamo album with "punk/metal sonics" that created a "half melodic, half noise assault."

== Track listing ==
All tracks are written by A Skylit Drive.

No.	Title	Length
1.	"In the Beginning There Was Void"	1:10
2.	"Knights of the Round"	2:49
3.	"Wires (And the Concept of Breathing)"	2:31
4.	"City on the Edge of Forever"	3:26
5.	"Eris and Dysnomia"	2:08
6.	"I'm Not a Thief, I'm a Treasure Hunter"	3:18
7.	"My Disease"	3:10
8.	"This Isn't the End"	2:55
9.	"Sleepwalker"	1:23
10.	"Pursuit Lets Wisdom Ride the Wind"	3:21
11.	"Ex-Machina"	3:03
12.	"Balance"	3:54
13.	"All It Takes for Your Dreams to Come True"	3:15
Total length:		36:22

Let Go of the Wires DVD
No.	Title	Length
1.	"Wires and the Concept of Breathing" (Music video)	3:03
2.	"All It Takes for Your Dreams to Come True" (Music video)	3:17
3.	"I'm Not a Thief, I'm a Treasure Hunter" (Music video)	3:40
4.	"Knights of the Round" (Music video)	3:00
5.	"This Isn't the End" (Music video)	3:18
6.	"Live at the Glasshouse" (9/21/2008)	18:13
7.	"Bonus Interviews"

== Personnel ==
A Skylit Drive

- Michael "Jag" Jagmin – lead vocals
- Brian White – unclean vocals, bass
- Joey Wilson – lead guitar
- Nick Miller – rhythm guitar
- Kyle Simmons – keyboards, programming
- Cory La Quay – drums, backing unclean vocals

Production and recording

- Al Jacob – Producer, assistant engineering
- Mitchell Marlow – Producer, mastering, mixing
- Jamie King – Additional production
- Kit Walters – Vocal production, mixing

Artwork and design

- Phill Mamula - Art direction, photography

== Chart positions ==
Chart (2008)	Peak position
US Billboard 200	171
US Top Heatseekers Albums	9
US Top Independent Albums	20
