= A Skylit Drive =

American post-hardcore band

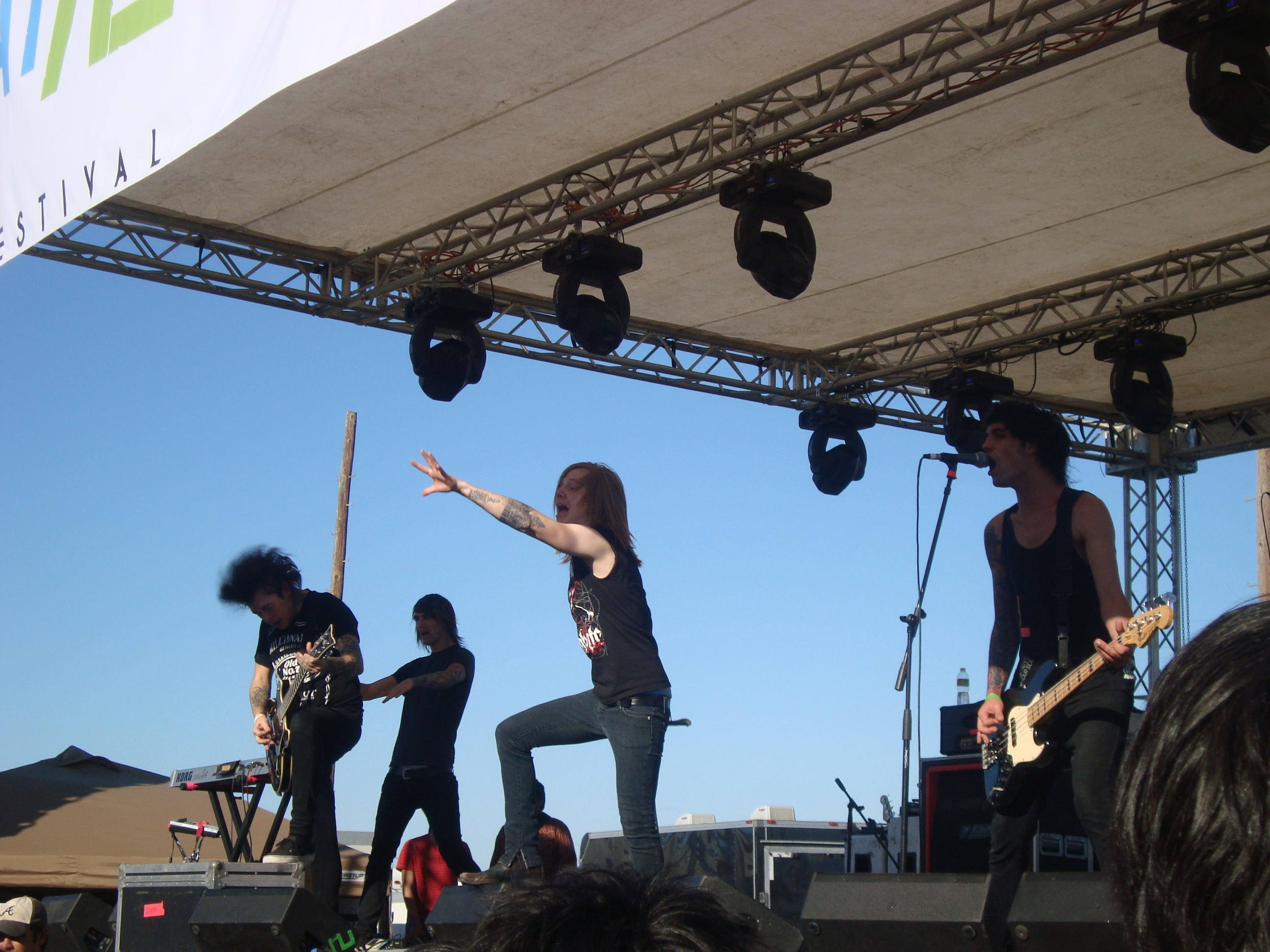
- A Skylit Drive in 2010

Background information
- Origin: Lodi, California
- Genres: Post-hardcore; emo; metalcore; screamo
- Years active: 2005–2017; 2022–present
- Labels: Fearless; Tragic Hero
- Members: Michael Jagmin; Louie Caycoya; Joey Galligan; KC Marotta
- Past members: Jordan Blake; Kyle Simmons; Michael Labelle; Brandon Richter; Curtis Daniger; Jerry Patterson; Brian White; Cory La Quay; Nick Miller; Joey Wilson; Ethan Church; Jon Kintz
- Website: askylitdrive.net

A Skylit Drive is an American post-hardcore band from Lodi, California. The band has released one DVD, one EP and five studio albums. The band has toured internationally both as a headliner and a supporting act. In 2017, the band broke up after a dispute between founding member and guitarist Nick Miller and vocalist Michael Jagmin. In 2022, the reunion of the band's original 2006 lineup led to a division into two factions, one associated with the original lineup and the other with Jagmin. Original vocalist Jordan Blake died in April 2023.

== History ==
=== Formation, She Watched the Sky EP and Blake's departure (2006–2007) ===
A Skylit Drive's original members met while attending Lodi High School in Lodi, California. Their debut EP, She Watched the Sky, was released January 2007 on Tragic Hero. Following this, the group toured with Four Letter Lie, Blessthefall, Scary Kids Scaring Kids, Greeley Estates, Oh, Sleeper, The Blackout, Alesana, Before Their Eyes, Dance Gavin Dance, Kenotia, Pierce the Veil and From First to Last.

Jordan Blake left the band mid-tour around November 2007 because of health issues, which made him unable to tour. He was briefly replaced by Jonny Craig, who also recorded a demo version of "Knights of the Round". He was replaced by Craig Mabbitt (formerly of Blessthefall) before Michael "Jag" Jagmin joined. Jordan Blake went on to form the band Speak of the Devil in 2013.

=== Jagmin's arrival, Wires and the Concept of Breathing (2008) ===
The full-length Wires and the Concept of Breathing (produced by Mitchell Marlow and Allen Jacob) appeared in May 2008. The album reached No. 171 on the U.S. Billboard 200, and No. 20 on the Top Independent Albums chart. Jagmin later described Wires as "kind of the staple album that everybody goes back to for us" although it "took a year to really catch on". Shortly after the release of the album, they filmed a music video for the nonprofit group To Write Love on Her Arms. A Skylit Drive appeared at the Bamboozle Left in 2008 and co-headlined a June tour alongside Sky Eats Airplane, with support from Breathe Carolina and Memphis May Fire. In late August, they supported August Burns Red alongside Sky Eats Airplane, Greeley Estates and This or the Apocalypse. They also filmed a live DVD called Let Go of the Wires, which was released on December 9, 2008.

=== Adelphia (2009–2010) ===
In early 2009 the band signed Fearless Records and announced a co-headlining tour with Dance Gavin Dance in April. The band was a part of Warped Tour for the 2009 season. On May 26, 2009, A Skylit Drive released a new song, entitled "Those Cannons Could Sink a Ship" onto iTunes and also for play on their MySpace page. Their second full-length album, Adelphia, was released on June 9, 2009, and peaked at number 64 on the Billboard 200. Singer Jagmin described it as "our most experimental album". The band released a music video for "Those Cannons Could Sink A Ship!" on October 19, 2009, directed by Spence Nicholson. The band filled in a support slot for Senses Fail in October, before they embarked on their first ten-date tour of Europe. The band recorded a cover of Journey's "Separate Ways (Worlds Apart)" for the next Punk Goes compilation. The band signed with Hassle Records in the UK, where the album was released in October 2009. From February to April 2010, the band toured the US and Europe as the main support to Alesana, on their 'The Emptiness Tour'.

=== Identity on Fire (2011) ===
Jagmin indicated that the band would begin writing and recording a follow-up to Adelphia in the middle of 2010 and suggested that the album would see an early 2011 release. The band announced in May 2010 that Desires of Sires will debut on their Adelphia tour. In July 2010 it was announced that the 6-piece had entered the studio recording together with Cameron Webb. The band was on the "Average Guys with Exceptional Hair" tour with bands Woe, Is Me, For All Those Sleeping, Motionless in White and Scarlett O'Hara.

On December 7, 2010, the band announced the track listing for the album and a date set on February 15, 2011. They toured mid January through February with Underoath, Thursday, and Animals as Leaders, and released a music video for "Too Little Too Late" on January 12, 2011. They were part of the Warped Tour 2011 at the Ernie Ball stage. The band also announced a European tour in late 2011 along with Woe, Is Me, I Set My Friends on Fire, and Sleeping with Sirens, and recorded the cover "Love the Way You Lie" for the Punk Goes... Compilation.

On January 20, 2012, A Skylit Drive released The Cali Buds music video, via Altpress.com, and in February toured Southeast Asia with Australian band For This Cause.

=== Departure of Joey Wilson and Rise (2012–2013) ===
By the middle of 2012 the band had begun the pre-production and would be entering the studio with Cameron Mizell in June 2013. On September 21, 2012, lead guitarist Joey Wilson confirmed that he had left the band, citing that it was "time for us both to move on to different things".

The band recorded a new single, entitled "Fallen", which was released on November 30, 2012, on the band's YouTube channel. After two albums, A Skylit Drive returned to Tragic Hero Records as they felt "like we needed a little bit more personal attention, [and they were] just able to give us a little more personal attention. They wanted us to be in the position where we were confident with the album". On November 26, the band embarked on the Nut Up or Shut Up tour, supporting Blessthefall. Further pre-production took place in February 2013 in Los Angeles.

It was announced on April 22, 2013, that the band entered the studio a week before to continue writing their album with Jim Wirt (Hoobastank, Alien Ant Farm), while Kit Walters, Mitchell Marlow and Al Jacobs also participated. With the time available to them, Jagmin explained that "we definitely gave each song more time than we were ever able to before. Everything was done minus the vocals on two songs, so I had a whole month to write vocals for two songs". In April 2013 the band played the Pulp Summer Slam XIII Til Death Do Us Part rock festival in Manila, Philippines. while they wrapped up pre-production with Jim Wirt in Cleveland at the start of May.

The official recording sessions with producer Cameron Mizell began on June 1 at the Chango Studios in Lake Mary, Florida. Drums, bass, guitar and electronics were completed by mid-June, with the band moving to Cameron Mizell's studio in Phoenix, to record vocals. The band finished recording on June 30, 2013. On July 18, the band announced that their brand new album would be entitled Rise, and set for release on September 24, followed by a headlining tour in support of the new album. Drummer La Quay commented that "[We] really sat down for almost nine months and [...] wrote a bunch of songs and had a bunch of different ears on it, and a bunch of different perspectives on it". On July 31, the band released the first single and title track off their new album, "Rise". By mid-August, the band released the track listing and announced an Australian tour supporting Dream On, Dreamer for November 2013. On September 6, the band released the second single of the album titled "Unbreakable".

Rise sold over 10,000 copies in its first week of release, leaving Jagmin to comment that the album had "caught on faster than the other ones". A Skylit Drive went on a national tour to support the album from September–October 2013, supported by For All Those Sleeping, I the Mighty, Wolves at the Gate, Pvris, and Incredible Me.

In March–April 2014, the band supported Memphis May Fire on the latter's "The Unconditional Tour" alongside The Word Alive, Hands Like Houses, and Beartooth. A Skylit Drive also performed at Warped Tour for the 2014 season.

=== Lineup changes, Rise: Ascension, ASD, Jagmin departure rumors and hiatus (2014–2017) ===
On October 21, both Brian White and Cory La Quay announced that they would be leaving the band due to creative differences, while the rest of the band decided to continue. On January 6, 2015, an acoustic version of the last album, entitled Rise: Ascension, was released. The following March they announced the addition of two new members, Michael Labelle (ex-Of Reverie, Preeminent) on guitars and Brandon Richter (formerly of Motionless in White) on drums, while keyboardist Kyle Simmons took over the bass. On March 10, 2015, they released the music video for "Within These Walls", and announced a North American tour. They released their fifth regular studio album ASD on October 9, 2015, and embarked on a tour in support of it. As of September 2016 the band are reduced to a four piece, without a permanent drummer. In March 2017, it was announced that band was on hiatus following Jagmin's departure.

=== Reunion & split, death of Jordan Blake (2022–present) ===
On January 23, 2022, the Instagram and Twitter accounts of some members of the band's original 2006 lineup announced that they were reuniting in celebration of the 15th anniversary of A Skylit Drive's debut EP She Watched the Sky, under the name Original A.S.D. The reformed group, consisting of Jordan Blake, Brian White, Joey Wilson, Cory La Quay, and Nick Miller, booked festival appearances at So What?! and Swanfest 2022. However, Jagmin filed a lawsuit against Original A.S.D., citing trademark infringement against A Skylit Drive. In response, Original A.S.D. changed their name to ASD and filed a countersuit, though Jon Hadusek for Consequence later noted it appeared Jagmin retained the trademark for the name A Skylit Drive. In May 2022, A Skylit Drive (consisting of Jagmin and Jonathan Kintz) added guitarist and vocalist Louie Caycoya and drummer KC Marotta.

In March 2023, Blake and Jagmin made a joint statement appearing to have mended tensions caused by the Skylit Drive–ASD split, though their statement was not well received by other ASD members. In April, A Skylit Drive announced a 15th anniversary tour celebrating Wires and the Concept of Breathing, supported by Scarlett O'Hara and SunSleep.

On May 1, 2023, ASD shared that founding A Skylit Drive vocalist Jordan Blake died on April 30, 2023, at 36 years old.

In September 2023, Marotta left A Skylit Drive due to his tour obligations with Wheatus. Ethan Church subsequently joined the band to fill on drums.

In April 2025, Church left the band after A Skylit Drive's spring tour ended. A Skylit Drive subsequently recruited drummer Myles Clayborne.

In September 2026, A Skylit Drive announced their new single Half Heart and their signing with Vaux Records, founded by former Rise Records founder Craig Ericson. The song and music video serves as their first single from the band’s forthcoming album Ashes. The album is currently in production with co-writer and producer Ryan Furlott and producer and mixer Joey Sturgis. The album is scheduled for release in early 2027.

== Musical style ==
While the band's debut EP involved predominantly screamed vocals, this was changed during the recording of the Wires album when Jagmin became the lead vocalist. The band were "happy with the vocal style we've chosen [as] the popularity of Wires along with it ... gives us a good enough thumbs up that the singing/screaming ratio we've stuck to is what works for us".

== Band members ==
Current

- Michael Jagmin – lead vocals (2008–2017, 2022–present), bass (2022–2024), keyboards, piano, synthesizers (2022–present)
- Louie Caycoya – rhythm guitar, unclean vocals (2022–present)
- KC Marotta – drums, percussion, backing vocals (2022–2023, 2026–present)
- Joey Galligan – bass, unclean vocals (2024–present), lead guitar (2026–present)

Former

Classic lineup

- Jordan Blake (Jordan Stribling) – lead vocals (2005–2007, 2022–2023; his death)
- Joey Wilson – lead guitar (2005–2012, 2022–2023)
- Nick Miller – lead guitar (2005, 2012–2017), rhythm guitar (2005–2012, 2022–2023; studio only 2012–2013)
- Kyle Simmons – keyboards, piano, synthesizers (2005–2017), bass (occasionally 2012–2014, full-time 2005, 2014–2017), rhythm guitar (live only 2012–2013, 2013–2015), drums, percussion (2014–2015, 2016–2017)
- Brian White – bass, unclean vocals (2005–2014, 2022–2023), clean vocals (2014, 2022–2023 live only)
- Cory La Quay – drums, percussion (2006–2014, 2022–2023), backing unclean vocals (2006–2014)

Subsequent and early members

- Curtis Daniger – bass (2005)
- Jerry Patterson – drums, percussion (2005–2006)
- Jonny Craig – lead vocals (2007, 2023 live shows only)
- Brandon Richter – drums, percussion (2015–2016)
- Michael Labelle – rhythm guitar, unclean vocals (2015–2017)
- KC Marotta – drums, percussion (2022–2023)
- Ethan Church – drums, percussion (2023–2025)
- Myles Clayborne – drums, percussion, backing vocals (2025–2026)
- Jonathan Kintz – lead guitar, keyboards, synthesizers (2022–2026), unclean vocals, drums, percussion (2022)

Touring

- Craig Mabbitt – lead vocals (2007)
- Justin Trotta – guitar (2010)
- Dominick Martino – drums (2016)
- Ian Seth – drums (2017)

Session

- Jim Wirt – bass (2015)
- Bret Wier – drums (2015)

== Discography ==
=== EPs ===
- She Watched the Sky (2007)

=== Albums ===
- Wires and the Concept of Breathing (2008)
- Adelphia (2009)
- Identity on Fire (2011)
- Rise (2013)
- ASD (2015)
