= List of minor planets: 861001–862000 =

The following is a partial list of minor planets, running from minor-planet number 861001 through 862000, inclusive. The primary data for this and other partial lists is based on JPL's "Small-Body Orbital Elements" and data available from the Minor Planet Center. Critical list information is also provided by the MPC, unless otherwise specified from Lowell Observatory. A detailed description of the table's columns and additional sources are given on the main page including a complete list of every page in this series, and a statistical break-up on the dynamical classification of minor planets.

Also see the summary list of all named bodies in numerical and alphabetical order, and the corresponding naming citations for the number range of this particular list. New namings may only be added to this list after official publication, as the preannouncement of names is condemned by the Working Group for Small Bodies Nomenclature of the International Astronomical Union.

Near-Earth obj.	MBA (inner)	MBA (outer)	Centaur
Mars-crosser	MBA (middle)	Jupiter trojan	Trans-Neptunian obj.
Unclassified

== 861001–861100 ==
Designation			Discovery			Properties		Ref
Permanent	Provisional	Named after	Date	Site	Discoverer(s)	Category	Diam.	Ref
861001	2014 HX_{160}	—	April 24, 2014	Mount Lemmon	Mount Lemmon Survey	·	1.3 km	MPC · JPL
861002	2014 HY_{160}	—	April 1, 2014	Mount Lemmon	Mount Lemmon Survey	·	830 m	MPC · JPL
861003	2014 HT_{165}	—	April 7, 2014	Mount Lemmon	Mount Lemmon Survey	·	1.3 km	MPC · JPL
861004	2014 HD_{169}	—	April 28, 2014	Haleakala	Pan-STARRS 1	·	1.1 km	MPC · JPL
861005	2014 HM_{170}	—	March 24, 2014	Haleakala	Pan-STARRS 1	·	1.4 km	MPC · JPL
861006	2014 HC_{172}	—	April 29, 2014	Haleakala	Pan-STARRS 1	·	490 m	MPC · JPL
861007	2014 HX_{172}	—	April 29, 2014	Haleakala	Pan-STARRS 1	·	500 m	MPC · JPL
861008	2014 HZ_{173}	—	April 29, 2014	Haleakala	Pan-STARRS 1	·	980 m	MPC · JPL
861009	2014 HC_{174}	—	April 29, 2014	Haleakala	Pan-STARRS 1	·	810 m	MPC · JPL
861010	2014 HU_{176}	—	May 3, 2009	Mount Lemmon	Mount Lemmon Survey	H	380 m	MPC · JPL
861011	2014 HV_{176}	—	April 7, 2014	Mount Lemmon	Mount Lemmon Survey	T_{j} (2.63) · unusual	10 km	MPC · JPL
861012	2014 HW_{176}	—	April 29, 2014	Haleakala	Pan-STARRS 1	H	340 m	MPC · JPL
861013	2014 HK_{177}	—	August 11, 2012	Haleakala	Pan-STARRS 1	H	400 m	MPC · JPL
861014	2014 HS_{177}	—	April 30, 2014	Haleakala	Pan-STARRS 1	·	300 m	MPC · JPL
861015	2014 HX_{177}	—	November 30, 2005	Kitt Peak	Spacewatch	H	340 m	MPC · JPL
861016	2014 HG_{178}	—	April 30, 2014	Haleakala	Pan-STARRS 1	H	400 m	MPC · JPL
861017	2014 HH_{179}	—	April 4, 2014	Haleakala	Pan-STARRS 1	·	530 m	MPC · JPL
861018	2014 HU_{179}	—	March 9, 2014	Haleakala	Pan-STARRS 1	·	1.1 km	MPC · JPL
861019	2014 HF_{180}	—	March 24, 2014	Haleakala	Pan-STARRS 1	·	590 m	MPC · JPL
861020	2014 HL_{181}	—	April 30, 2014	Haleakala	Pan-STARRS 1	H	380 m	MPC · JPL
861021	2014 HV_{182}	—	April 8, 2014	Mount Lemmon	Mount Lemmon Survey	·	1.2 km	MPC · JPL
861022	2014 HJ_{190}	—	April 30, 2014	Haleakala	Pan-STARRS 1	·	1.1 km	MPC · JPL
861023	2014 HN_{200}	—	October 20, 2012	Haleakala	Pan-STARRS 1	H	380 m	MPC · JPL
861024	2014 HW_{203}	—	March 18, 2009	Mount Lemmon	Mount Lemmon Survey	·	1.3 km	MPC · JPL
861025	2014 HR_{205}	—	April 25, 2014	Mount Lemmon	Mount Lemmon Survey	·	1.2 km	MPC · JPL
861026	2014 HB_{206}	—	April 29, 2014	Haleakala	Pan-STARRS 1	·	970 m	MPC · JPL
861027	2014 HW_{206}	—	April 30, 2014	Haleakala	Pan-STARRS 1	EUN	700 m	MPC · JPL
861028	2014 HN_{211}	—	April 1, 2014	Mount Lemmon	Mount Lemmon Survey	NYS	850 m	MPC · JPL
861029	2014 HU_{211}	—	April 29, 2014	Haleakala	Pan-STARRS 1	·	960 m	MPC · JPL
861030	2014 HW_{211}	—	April 30, 2014	Haleakala	Pan-STARRS 1	·	630 m	MPC · JPL
861031	2014 HT_{212}	—	April 30, 2014	Haleakala	Pan-STARRS 1	·	620 m	MPC · JPL
861032	2014 HZ_{212}	—	April 30, 2014	Haleakala	Pan-STARRS 1	·	540 m	MPC · JPL
861033	2014 HE_{213}	—	April 29, 2014	Haleakala	Pan-STARRS 1	·	490 m	MPC · JPL
861034	2014 HJ_{213}	—	April 29, 2014	Haleakala	Pan-STARRS 1	H	340 m	MPC · JPL
861035	2014 HD_{214}	—	March 7, 2014	Kitt Peak	Spacewatch	·	700 m	MPC · JPL
861036	2014 HB_{215}	—	April 25, 2014	Mount Lemmon	Mount Lemmon Survey	NYS	730 m	MPC · JPL
861037	2014 HV_{215}	—	February 12, 2018	Haleakala	Pan-STARRS 1	·	1.2 km	MPC · JPL
861038	2014 HW_{215}	—	April 28, 2014	Haleakala	Pan-STARRS 1	·	1.1 km	MPC · JPL
861039	2014 HZ_{215}	—	April 29, 2014	Haleakala	Pan-STARRS 1	RAF	660 m	MPC · JPL
861040	2014 HA_{216}	—	April 24, 2014	Mount Lemmon	Mount Lemmon Survey	·	1.7 km	MPC · JPL
861041	2014 HE_{216}	—	April 21, 2014	Mount Lemmon	Mount Lemmon Survey	·	920 m	MPC · JPL
861042	2014 HF_{216}	—	April 21, 2014	Mount Lemmon	Mount Lemmon Survey	H	290 m	MPC · JPL
861043	2014 HH_{216}	—	April 29, 2014	Haleakala	Pan-STARRS 1	·	850 m	MPC · JPL
861044	2014 HC_{218}	—	April 29, 2014	Haleakala	Pan-STARRS 1	·	1.2 km	MPC · JPL
861045	2014 HF_{219}	—	April 29, 2014	Haleakala	Pan-STARRS 1	GEF	910 m	MPC · JPL
861046	2014 HN_{221}	—	April 30, 2014	Haleakala	Pan-STARRS 1	·	1.3 km	MPC · JPL
861047	2014 HR_{221}	—	April 29, 2014	Haleakala	Pan-STARRS 1	·	1.3 km	MPC · JPL
861048	2014 HG_{222}	—	April 24, 2014	Mount Lemmon	Mount Lemmon Survey	·	2.2 km	MPC · JPL
861049	2014 HW_{222}	—	April 23, 2014	Mount Lemmon	Mount Lemmon Survey	VER	2.0 km	MPC · JPL
861050	2014 HA_{223}	—	April 30, 2014	Haleakala	Pan-STARRS 1	·	660 m	MPC · JPL
861051	2014 HG_{223}	—	February 2, 2008	Kitt Peak	Spacewatch	·	1.4 km	MPC · JPL
861052	2014 HT_{223}	—	April 29, 2014	Haleakala	Pan-STARRS 1	·	1.6 km	MPC · JPL
861053	2014 HL_{224}	—	April 29, 2014	Haleakala	Pan-STARRS 1	·	1.0 km	MPC · JPL
861054	2014 HP_{226}	—	April 30, 2014	Haleakala	Pan-STARRS 1	HNS	930 m	MPC · JPL
861055	2014 HY_{226}	—	April 23, 2014	Mount Lemmon	Mount Lemmon Survey	·	1.2 km	MPC · JPL
861056	2014 HH_{227}	—	April 30, 2014	Haleakala	Pan-STARRS 1	·	690 m	MPC · JPL
861057	2014 HW_{228}	—	April 24, 2014	Haleakala	Pan-STARRS 1	·	940 m	MPC · JPL
861058	2014 HV_{229}	—	April 30, 2014	Haleakala	Pan-STARRS 1	AGN	920 m	MPC · JPL
861059	2014 HH_{230}	—	April 29, 2014	Haleakala	Pan-STARRS 1	BRA	1.0 km	MPC · JPL
861060	2014 HJ_{230}	—	April 30, 2014	Haleakala	Pan-STARRS 1	·	610 m	MPC · JPL
861061	2014 HK_{230}	—	April 5, 2014	Haleakala	Pan-STARRS 1	·	560 m	MPC · JPL
861062	2014 HL_{230}	—	April 29, 2014	Haleakala	Pan-STARRS 1	·	410 m	MPC · JPL
861063	2014 HN_{230}	—	April 30, 2014	Haleakala	Pan-STARRS 1	·	540 m	MPC · JPL
861064	2014 HQ_{230}	—	April 23, 2014	Haleakala	Pan-STARRS 1	(2076)	510 m	MPC · JPL
861065	2014 HU_{231}	—	April 24, 2014	Mount Lemmon	Mount Lemmon Survey	·	510 m	MPC · JPL
861066	2014 HG_{235}	—	April 29, 2014	Kitt Peak	Spacewatch	·	900 m	MPC · JPL
861067	2014 HC_{236}	—	April 24, 2014	Mount Lemmon	Mount Lemmon Survey	·	1.5 km	MPC · JPL
861068	2014 HZ_{236}	—	May 20, 2010	Mount Lemmon	Mount Lemmon Survey	·	780 m	MPC · JPL
861069	2014 HS_{237}	—	May 20, 2014	Haleakala	Pan-STARRS 1	V	370 m	MPC · JPL
861070	2014 HC_{238}	—	October 10, 2008	Mount Lemmon	Mount Lemmon Survey	·	510 m	MPC · JPL
861071	2014 HV_{238}	—	April 23, 2014	Cerro Tololo	DECam	·	1.7 km	MPC · JPL
861072	2014 HE_{239}	—	November 3, 2011	Mount Lemmon	Mount Lemmon Survey	·	1.5 km	MPC · JPL
861073	2014 HN_{239}	—	April 28, 2014	Cerro Tololo	DECam	·	960 m	MPC · JPL
861074	2014 HA_{244}	—	April 24, 2014	Mount Lemmon	Mount Lemmon Survey	·	420 m	MPC · JPL
861075	2014 HQ_{247}	—	April 28, 2014	Cerro Tololo	DECam	·	770 m	MPC · JPL
861076	2014 HS_{248}	—	September 18, 2001	Kitt Peak	Spacewatch	·	1.4 km	MPC · JPL
861077	2014 HO_{254}	—	April 23, 2014	Cerro Tololo	DECam	KOR	870 m	MPC · JPL
861078	2014 HW_{257}	—	October 25, 2008	Kitt Peak	Spacewatch	·	560 m	MPC · JPL
861079	2014 HC_{258}	—	April 28, 2014	Cerro Tololo	DECam	V	360 m	MPC · JPL
861080	2014 HU_{269}	—	October 22, 2008	Kitt Peak	Spacewatch	·	410 m	MPC · JPL
861081	2014 HO_{280}	—	April 21, 2006	Mount Lemmon	Mount Lemmon Survey	3:2	3.9 km	MPC · JPL
861082	2014 HP_{280}	—	January 31, 2013	Kitt Peak	Spacewatch	MRX	760 m	MPC · JPL
861083	2014 HE_{289}	—	April 23, 2014	Haleakala	Pan-STARRS 1	·	980 m	MPC · JPL
861084	2014 HR_{293}	—	September 25, 2015	Mount Lemmon	Mount Lemmon Survey	·	390 m	MPC · JPL
861085	2014 HD_{295}	—	October 2, 2008	Kitt Peak	Spacewatch	·	470 m	MPC · JPL
861086	2014 HC_{297}	—	April 23, 2014	Haleakala	Pan-STARRS 1	MAS	600 m	MPC · JPL
861087	2014 HK_{311}	—	April 28, 2014	Cerro Tololo	DECam	·	540 m	MPC · JPL
861088	2014 HS_{312}	—	November 1, 2005	Mount Lemmon	Mount Lemmon Survey	·	460 m	MPC · JPL
861089	2014 HG_{338}	—	April 30, 2014	Haleakala	Pan-STARRS 1	·	1.0 km	MPC · JPL
861090	2014 HY_{348}	—	April 28, 2014	Cerro Tololo	DECam	·	790 m	MPC · JPL
861091	2014 HW_{355}	—	May 21, 2014	Haleakala	Pan-STARRS 1	·	1.3 km	MPC · JPL
861092	2014 HF_{359}	—	April 28, 2014	Mount Lemmon	Mount Lemmon Survey	PHO	540 m	MPC · JPL
861093	2014 HA_{375}	—	October 27, 2008	Mount Lemmon	Mount Lemmon Survey	·	470 m	MPC · JPL
861094	2014 HO_{393}	—	October 27, 2008	Kitt Peak	Spacewatch	·	440 m	MPC · JPL
861095	2014 HX_{533}	—	April 23, 2014	Cerro Tololo	DECam	·	1.1 km	MPC · JPL
861096	2014 HL_{535}	—	April 21, 2014	Mount Lemmon	Mount Lemmon Survey	·	510 m	MPC · JPL
861097	2014 HP_{536}	—	December 23, 2012	Haleakala	Pan-STARRS 1	·	1.2 km	MPC · JPL
861098	2014 HR_{536}	—	April 24, 2014	Cerro Tololo	DECam	·	1.4 km	MPC · JPL
861099	2014 JU	—	April 29, 2014	Haleakala	Pan-STARRS 1	·	1.2 km	MPC · JPL
861100	2014 JE_{2}	—	April 25, 2014	Mount Lemmon	Mount Lemmon Survey	·	520 m	MPC · JPL

== 861101–861200 ==
back to top

Designation			Discovery			Properties		Ref
Permanent	Provisional	Named after	Date	Site	Discoverer(s)	Category	Diam.	Ref
861101	2014 JK_{5}	—	January 4, 2013	Cerro Tololo	D. E. Trilling, R. L. Allen	ADE	1.3 km	MPC · JPL
861102	2014 JY_{8}	—	May 3, 2014	Mount Lemmon	Mount Lemmon Survey	·	1.5 km	MPC · JPL
861103	2014 JH_{9}	—	May 3, 2014	Mount Lemmon	Mount Lemmon Survey	·	680 m	MPC · JPL
861104	2014 JO_{9}	—	February 21, 2007	Kitt Peak	Spacewatch	·	470 m	MPC · JPL
861105	2014 JA_{11}	—	May 3, 2014	Mount Lemmon	Mount Lemmon Survey	ADE	1.3 km	MPC · JPL
861106	2014 JY_{13}	—	April 30, 2014	ESA OGS	ESA OGS	(5)	900 m	MPC · JPL
861107	2014 JR_{14}	—	May 3, 2014	Mount Lemmon	Mount Lemmon Survey	V	440 m	MPC · JPL
861108	2014 JH_{16}	—	February 28, 2014	Haleakala	Pan-STARRS 1	JUN	850 m	MPC · JPL
861109	2014 JC_{23}	—	April 1, 2014	Mount Lemmon	Mount Lemmon Survey	·	2.0 km	MPC · JPL
861110	2014 JP_{24}	—	December 10, 2004	Campo Imperatore	CINEOS	·	1.5 km	MPC · JPL
861111	2014 JS_{24}	—	May 4, 2014	Haleakala	Pan-STARRS 1	H	290 m	MPC · JPL
861112	2014 JB_{25}	—	May 6, 2014	Mount Lemmon	Mount Lemmon Survey	H	300 m	MPC · JPL
861113	2014 JM_{26}	—	May 25, 2006	Mount Lemmon	Mount Lemmon Survey	·	1.0 km	MPC · JPL
861114	2014 JE_{30}	—	May 6, 2014	Haleakala	Pan-STARRS 1	H	380 m	MPC · JPL
861115	2014 JC_{31}	—	May 6, 2014	Haleakala	Pan-STARRS 1	T_{j} (2.93) · AMO · APO	550 m	MPC · JPL
861116	2014 JO_{33}	—	February 14, 2010	Mount Lemmon	Mount Lemmon Survey	·	730 m	MPC · JPL
861117	2014 JS_{33}	—	May 4, 2014	Mount Lemmon	Mount Lemmon Survey	·	680 m	MPC · JPL
861118	2014 JJ_{37}	—	May 4, 2014	Haleakala	Pan-STARRS 1	·	500 m	MPC · JPL
861119	2014 JH_{38}	—	June 8, 2011	Mount Lemmon	Mount Lemmon Survey	·	420 m	MPC · JPL
861120	2014 JE_{39}	—	April 25, 2014	Mount Lemmon	Mount Lemmon Survey	·	540 m	MPC · JPL
861121	2014 JP_{40}	—	April 30, 2014	Haleakala	Pan-STARRS 1	·	1.1 km	MPC · JPL
861122	2014 JQ_{41}	—	April 30, 2014	Haleakala	Pan-STARRS 1	NYS	890 m	MPC · JPL
861123	2014 JG_{46}	—	April 8, 2014	Kitt Peak	Spacewatch	(194)	1.2 km	MPC · JPL
861124	2014 JY_{47}	—	May 6, 2014	Haleakala	Pan-STARRS 1	·	500 m	MPC · JPL
861125	2014 JA_{52}	—	May 8, 2014	Haleakala	Pan-STARRS 1	·	1.1 km	MPC · JPL
861126	2014 JF_{56}	—	April 1, 2014	Mount Lemmon	Mount Lemmon Survey	H	320 m	MPC · JPL
861127	2014 JK_{56}	—	May 6, 2014	Haleakala	Pan-STARRS 1	H	410 m	MPC · JPL
861128	2014 JH_{57}	—	May 10, 2014	WISE	WISE	T_{j} (2.26) · APO +1km	4.6 km	MPC · JPL
861129	2014 JV_{61}	—	May 7, 2014	Haleakala	Pan-STARRS 1	·	2.2 km	MPC · JPL
861130	2014 JA_{66}	—	October 25, 2011	Haleakala	Pan-STARRS 1	·	650 m	MPC · JPL
861131	2014 JQ_{67}	—	February 16, 2010	Mount Lemmon	Mount Lemmon Survey	NYS	690 m	MPC · JPL
861132	2014 JR_{67}	—	April 25, 2014	Mount Lemmon	Mount Lemmon Survey	·	1.2 km	MPC · JPL
861133	2014 JD_{70}	—	February 28, 2008	Kitt Peak	Spacewatch	·	1.7 km	MPC · JPL
861134	2014 JJ_{71}	—	May 8, 2014	Haleakala	Pan-STARRS 1	·	850 m	MPC · JPL
861135	2014 JW_{71}	—	April 3, 2014	Haleakala	Pan-STARRS 1	PHO	760 m	MPC · JPL
861136	2014 JG_{72}	—	August 10, 2007	Kitt Peak	Spacewatch	NYS	860 m	MPC · JPL
861137	2014 JS_{78}	—	May 4, 2014	Mount Lemmon	Mount Lemmon Survey	·	1.1 km	MPC · JPL
861138	2014 JY_{80}	—	May 3, 2014	Mount Lemmon	Mount Lemmon Survey	H	270 m	MPC · JPL
861139	2014 JK_{81}	—	May 5, 2014	Mount Lemmon	Mount Lemmon Survey	H	410 m	MPC · JPL
861140	2014 JP_{81}	—	May 3, 2014	Mount Lemmon	Mount Lemmon Survey	H	320 m	MPC · JPL
861141	2014 JP_{82}	—	May 4, 2014	Haleakala	Pan-STARRS 1	·	1.3 km	MPC · JPL
861142	2014 JS_{87}	—	May 15, 2009	Kitt Peak	Spacewatch	·	1.9 km	MPC · JPL
861143	2014 JK_{88}	—	January 31, 2006	Vallemare Borbona	V. S. Casulli	NYS	840 m	MPC · JPL
861144	2014 JC_{89}	—	May 6, 2014	Mount Lemmon	Mount Lemmon Survey	·	400 m	MPC · JPL
861145	2014 JD_{90}	—	May 8, 2014	Haleakala	Pan-STARRS 1	·	910 m	MPC · JPL
861146	2014 JJ_{90}	—	May 8, 2014	Haleakala	Pan-STARRS 1	·	1.7 km	MPC · JPL
861147	2014 JP_{90}	—	October 26, 2011	Haleakala	Pan-STARRS 1	·	1.1 km	MPC · JPL
861148	2014 JW_{91}	—	May 7, 2014	Haleakala	Pan-STARRS 1	·	1.3 km	MPC · JPL
861149	2014 JZ_{93}	—	May 7, 2014	Haleakala	Pan-STARRS 1	·	410 m	MPC · JPL
861150	2014 JF_{94}	—	May 7, 2014	Haleakala	Pan-STARRS 1	·	570 m	MPC · JPL
861151	2014 JG_{96}	—	May 5, 2014	Mount Lemmon	Mount Lemmon Survey	·	1.4 km	MPC · JPL
861152	2014 JC_{100}	—	May 6, 2014	Haleakala	Pan-STARRS 1	·	1.3 km	MPC · JPL
861153	2014 JK_{100}	—	May 8, 2014	Haleakala	Pan-STARRS 1	·	460 m	MPC · JPL
861154	2014 JC_{101}	—	May 7, 2014	Haleakala	Pan-STARRS 1	H	280 m	MPC · JPL
861155	2014 JV_{102}	—	May 3, 2014	Kitt Peak	Spacewatch	·	1.1 km	MPC · JPL
861156	2014 JC_{103}	—	May 4, 2014	Haleakala	Pan-STARRS 1	·	860 m	MPC · JPL
861157	2014 JK_{104}	—	May 2, 2014	Kitt Peak	Spacewatch	·	1.4 km	MPC · JPL
861158	2014 JM_{104}	—	May 4, 2014	Mount Lemmon	Mount Lemmon Survey	·	540 m	MPC · JPL
861159	2014 JZ_{104}	—	May 9, 2014	Haleakala	Pan-STARRS 1	·	1.2 km	MPC · JPL
861160	2014 JJ_{105}	—	May 8, 2014	Haleakala	Pan-STARRS 1	V	430 m	MPC · JPL
861161	2014 JP_{106}	—	May 2, 2014	Mount Lemmon	Mount Lemmon Survey	·	460 m	MPC · JPL
861162	2014 JQ_{106}	—	May 7, 2014	Haleakala	Pan-STARRS 1	·	1.0 km	MPC · JPL
861163	2014 JX_{106}	—	May 8, 2014	Haleakala	Pan-STARRS 1	·	790 m	MPC · JPL
861164	2014 JJ_{107}	—	May 7, 2014	Haleakala	Pan-STARRS 1	·	1.4 km	MPC · JPL
861165	2014 JL_{107}	—	May 7, 2014	Haleakala	Pan-STARRS 1	EOS	1.6 km	MPC · JPL
861166	2014 JU_{107}	—	May 6, 2014	Haleakala	Pan-STARRS 1	·	770 m	MPC · JPL
861167	2014 JE_{108}	—	May 7, 2014	Haleakala	Pan-STARRS 1	·	490 m	MPC · JPL
861168	2014 JK_{109}	—	May 6, 2014	Haleakala	Pan-STARRS 1	·	1.7 km	MPC · JPL
861169	2014 JO_{109}	—	May 7, 2014	Haleakala	Pan-STARRS 1	·	1.1 km	MPC · JPL
861170	2014 JG_{110}	—	May 7, 2014	Haleakala	Pan-STARRS 1	·	1.6 km	MPC · JPL
861171	2014 JQ_{110}	—	May 10, 2014	Haleakala	Pan-STARRS 1	THB	2.0 km	MPC · JPL
861172	2014 JZ_{110}	—	May 8, 2014	Haleakala	Pan-STARRS 1	V	450 m	MPC · JPL
861173	2014 JT_{111}	—	May 8, 2014	Haleakala	Pan-STARRS 1	·	1.0 km	MPC · JPL
861174	2014 JJ_{112}	—	May 8, 2014	Haleakala	Pan-STARRS 1	·	1.3 km	MPC · JPL
861175	2014 JK_{112}	—	May 8, 2014	Haleakala	Pan-STARRS 1	KOR	920 m	MPC · JPL
861176	2014 JM_{112}	—	May 7, 2014	Haleakala	Pan-STARRS 1	·	1.0 km	MPC · JPL
861177	2014 JB_{113}	—	May 8, 2014	Haleakala	Pan-STARRS 1	·	1.4 km	MPC · JPL
861178	2014 JH_{113}	—	May 8, 2014	Haleakala	Pan-STARRS 1	KOR	900 m	MPC · JPL
861179	2014 JJ_{113}	—	May 8, 2014	Haleakala	Pan-STARRS 1	·	1.6 km	MPC · JPL
861180	2014 JQ_{114}	—	May 3, 2014	Mount Lemmon	Mount Lemmon Survey	·	1.2 km	MPC · JPL
861181	2014 JZ_{114}	—	May 8, 2014	Haleakala	Pan-STARRS 1	H	340 m	MPC · JPL
861182	2014 JF_{115}	—	May 7, 2014	Haleakala	Pan-STARRS 1	·	1.5 km	MPC · JPL
861183	2014 JX_{116}	—	May 7, 2014	Haleakala	Pan-STARRS 1	V	370 m	MPC · JPL
861184	2014 JM_{118}	—	May 8, 2014	Haleakala	Pan-STARRS 1	·	1.2 km	MPC · JPL
861185	2014 JQ_{118}	—	May 6, 2014	Haleakala	Pan-STARRS 1	·	1.2 km	MPC · JPL
861186	2014 JW_{118}	—	May 8, 2014	Haleakala	Pan-STARRS 1	·	640 m	MPC · JPL
861187	2014 JL_{119}	—	May 4, 2014	Haleakala	Pan-STARRS 1	NYS	640 m	MPC · JPL
861188	2014 JP_{119}	—	May 7, 2014	Haleakala	Pan-STARRS 1	·	530 m	MPC · JPL
861189	2014 JT_{119}	—	May 4, 2014	Haleakala	Pan-STARRS 1	·	490 m	MPC · JPL
861190	2014 JO_{120}	—	May 4, 2014	Haleakala	Pan-STARRS 1	·	560 m	MPC · JPL
861191	2014 JT_{120}	—	May 6, 2014	Mount Lemmon	Mount Lemmon Survey	·	1.1 km	MPC · JPL
861192	2014 JY_{120}	—	May 8, 2014	Haleakala	Pan-STARRS 1	·	1.0 km	MPC · JPL
861193	2014 JL_{121}	—	May 6, 2014	Haleakala	Pan-STARRS 1	·	560 m	MPC · JPL
861194	2014 JT_{122}	—	May 3, 2014	Kitt Peak	Spacewatch	·	450 m	MPC · JPL
861195	2014 JZ_{122}	—	May 8, 2014	Haleakala	Pan-STARRS 1	·	1.8 km	MPC · JPL
861196	2014 JE_{124}	—	May 7, 2014	Haleakala	Pan-STARRS 1	·	1.0 km	MPC · JPL
861197	2014 JM_{124}	—	May 4, 2014	Haleakala	Pan-STARRS 1	·	460 m	MPC · JPL
861198	2014 JV_{127}	—	May 8, 2014	Haleakala	Pan-STARRS 1	·	1.2 km	MPC · JPL
861199	2014 JH_{129}	—	May 6, 2014	Haleakala	Pan-STARRS 1	V	350 m	MPC · JPL
861200	2014 JX_{130}	—	May 3, 2014	Mount Lemmon	Mount Lemmon Survey	·	1.7 km	MPC · JPL

== 861201–861300 ==
back to top

Designation			Discovery			Properties		Ref
Permanent	Provisional	Named after	Date	Site	Discoverer(s)	Category	Diam.	Ref
861201	2014 JD_{131}	—	May 8, 2014	Haleakala	Pan-STARRS 1	TIR	2.0 km	MPC · JPL
861202	2014 JU_{132}	—	May 5, 2014	Cerro Tololo-DECam	DECam	·	1.1 km	MPC · JPL
861203	2014 JG_{141}	—	May 7, 2014	Haleakala	Pan-STARRS 1	·	1.3 km	MPC · JPL
861204	2014 JM_{143}	—	May 8, 2014	Haleakala	Pan-STARRS 1	·	1.3 km	MPC · JPL
861205	2014 JR_{145}	—	May 8, 2014	Mount Lemmon	Mount Lemmon Survey	·	930 m	MPC · JPL
861206	2014 JB_{147}	—	May 8, 2014	Haleakala	Pan-STARRS 1	·	1.3 km	MPC · JPL
861207	2014 JB_{157}	—	May 7, 2014	Haleakala	Pan-STARRS 1	·	1.4 km	MPC · JPL
861208	2014 KD_{6}	—	August 20, 2011	Haleakala	Pan-STARRS 1	·	740 m	MPC · JPL
861209	2014 KY_{8}	—	April 30, 2014	Haleakala	Pan-STARRS 1	·	590 m	MPC · JPL
861210	2014 KQ_{9}	—	April 30, 2014	Haleakala	Pan-STARRS 1	·	630 m	MPC · JPL
861211	2014 KG_{10}	—	October 27, 2008	Mount Lemmon	Mount Lemmon Survey	·	550 m	MPC · JPL
861212	2014 KV_{10}	—	March 10, 2007	Kitt Peak	Spacewatch	·	490 m	MPC · JPL
861213	2014 KY_{15}	—	November 30, 2011	Kitt Peak	Spacewatch	·	1.1 km	MPC · JPL
861214	2014 KJ_{20}	—	July 3, 2011	Mount Lemmon	Mount Lemmon Survey	·	510 m	MPC · JPL
861215	2014 KZ_{20}	—	September 17, 2006	Catalina	CSS	·	1.0 km	MPC · JPL
861216	2014 KZ_{21}	—	February 28, 2014	Haleakala	Pan-STARRS 1	·	1.3 km	MPC · JPL
861217	2014 KH_{22}	—	May 2, 2014	Mount Lemmon	Mount Lemmon Survey	·	550 m	MPC · JPL
861218	2014 KN_{26}	—	April 25, 2014	Kitt Peak	Spacewatch	·	1.2 km	MPC · JPL
861219	2014 KL_{31}	—	April 23, 2007	Mount Lemmon	Mount Lemmon Survey	·	550 m	MPC · JPL
861220	2014 KA_{33}	—	May 22, 2014	Haleakala	Pan-STARRS 1	·	910 m	MPC · JPL
861221	2014 KK_{34}	—	May 7, 2014	Haleakala	Pan-STARRS 1	·	1.9 km	MPC · JPL
861222	2014 KP_{39}	—	May 22, 2014	WISE	WISE	·	1.6 km	MPC · JPL
861223	2014 KH_{40}	—	May 7, 2014	Haleakala	Pan-STARRS 1	H	270 m	MPC · JPL
861224	2014 KW_{40}	—	May 8, 2014	Haleakala	Pan-STARRS 1	·	1.4 km	MPC · JPL
861225	2014 KF_{41}	—	August 27, 2011	Haleakala	Pan-STARRS 1	·	530 m	MPC · JPL
861226	2014 KB_{45}	—	May 24, 2014	Mount Lemmon	Mount Lemmon Survey	H	350 m	MPC · JPL
861227	2014 KM_{46}	—	April 20, 2009	Mount Lemmon	Mount Lemmon Survey	·	1.3 km	MPC · JPL
861228	2014 KR_{46}	—	May 21, 2014	Haleakala	Pan-STARRS 1	·	490 m	MPC · JPL
861229	2014 KZ_{48}	—	September 27, 2006	Mount Lemmon	Mount Lemmon Survey	T_{j} (2.98)	2.7 km	MPC · JPL
861230	2014 KB_{50}	—	April 5, 2014	Haleakala	Pan-STARRS 1	NYS	770 m	MPC · JPL
861231	2014 KZ_{50}	—	May 21, 2014	Haleakala	Pan-STARRS 1	·	520 m	MPC · JPL
861232	2014 KC_{54}	—	May 22, 2014	Mount Lemmon	Mount Lemmon Survey	·	1.9 km	MPC · JPL
861233	2014 KL_{55}	—	August 25, 2011	La Sagra	OAM	·	420 m	MPC · JPL
861234	2014 KA_{57}	—	May 24, 2014	Mount Lemmon	Mount Lemmon Survey	·	1.2 km	MPC · JPL
861235	2014 KP_{59}	—	August 3, 2010	Kitt Peak	Spacewatch	·	1.4 km	MPC · JPL
861236	2014 KQ_{62}	—	September 14, 2012	Mount Lemmon	Mount Lemmon Survey	H	470 m	MPC · JPL
861237	2014 KU_{65}	—	May 21, 2014	Haleakala	Pan-STARRS 1	·	510 m	MPC · JPL
861238	2014 KX_{67}	—	March 2, 2009	Mount Lemmon	Mount Lemmon Survey	·	1.5 km	MPC · JPL
861239	2014 KM_{69}	—	December 4, 2012	Mount Lemmon	Mount Lemmon Survey	·	970 m	MPC · JPL
861240	2014 KN_{72}	—	December 18, 2007	Mount Lemmon	Mount Lemmon Survey	HNS	700 m	MPC · JPL
861241	2014 KN_{73}	—	May 9, 2014	Haleakala	Pan-STARRS 1	·	2.2 km	MPC · JPL
861242	2014 KU_{75}	—	May 23, 2014	Haleakala	Pan-STARRS 1	H	360 m	MPC · JPL
861243	2014 KB_{76}	—	September 24, 2011	Haleakala	Pan-STARRS 1	·	440 m	MPC · JPL
861244	2014 KE_{79}	—	April 30, 2014	Haleakala	Pan-STARRS 1	·	1.3 km	MPC · JPL
861245	2014 KH_{79}	—	May 21, 2014	Haleakala	Pan-STARRS 1	·	1.9 km	MPC · JPL
861246	2014 KM_{83}	—	May 28, 2014	Mount Lemmon	Mount Lemmon Survey	·	580 m	MPC · JPL
861247	2014 KM_{88}	—	March 19, 2001	Sacramento Peak	SDSS	(1547)	1.1 km	MPC · JPL
861248	2014 KN_{88}	—	May 7, 2014	Haleakala	Pan-STARRS 1	·	1.4 km	MPC · JPL
861249	2014 KO_{90}	—	May 30, 2014	Mount Lemmon	Mount Lemmon Survey	·	730 m	MPC · JPL
861250	2014 KQ_{94}	—	May 7, 2014	Haleakala	Pan-STARRS 1	·	640 m	MPC · JPL
861251	2014 KT_{95}	—	May 7, 2014	Haleakala	Pan-STARRS 1	·	2.0 km	MPC · JPL
861252	2014 KK_{96}	—	May 7, 2014	Haleakala	Pan-STARRS 1	·	430 m	MPC · JPL
861253	2014 KO_{96}	—	July 3, 2011	Mount Lemmon	Mount Lemmon Survey	·	500 m	MPC · JPL
861254	2014 KW_{100}	—	May 27, 2014	Haleakala	Pan-STARRS 1	H	410 m	MPC · JPL
861255	2014 KF_{102}	—	May 26, 2014	Haleakala	Pan-STARRS 1	H	310 m	MPC · JPL
861256	2014 KK_{102}	—	May 26, 2014	Haleakala	Pan-STARRS 1	H	370 m	MPC · JPL
861257	2014 KL_{102}	—	May 26, 2014	Haleakala	Pan-STARRS 1	H	320 m	MPC · JPL
861258	2014 KB_{103}	—	May 7, 2014	Haleakala	Pan-STARRS 1	·	1.4 km	MPC · JPL
861259	2014 KB_{105}	—	May 7, 2014	Haleakala	Pan-STARRS 1	·	930 m	MPC · JPL
861260	2014 KF_{105}	—	May 26, 2014	Haleakala	Pan-STARRS 1	·	920 m	MPC · JPL
861261	2014 KT_{105}	—	September 6, 2004	Palomar	NEAT	·	1.8 km	MPC · JPL
861262	2014 KD_{108}	—	April 19, 2006	Kitt Peak	Spacewatch	·	990 m	MPC · JPL
861263	2014 KN_{110}	—	May 24, 2014	Mount Lemmon	Mount Lemmon Survey	·	1.4 km	MPC · JPL
861264	2014 KT_{113}	—	May 22, 2014	Mount Lemmon	Mount Lemmon Survey	·	1.2 km	MPC · JPL
861265	2014 KY_{113}	—	May 21, 2014	Haleakala	Pan-STARRS 1	·	1.4 km	MPC · JPL
861266	2014 KF_{114}	—	May 25, 2014	Haleakala	Pan-STARRS 1	H	410 m	MPC · JPL
861267	2014 KK_{114}	—	May 21, 2014	Haleakala	Pan-STARRS 1	·	610 m	MPC · JPL
861268	2014 KJ_{115}	—	May 23, 2014	Haleakala	Pan-STARRS 1	·	590 m	MPC · JPL
861269	2014 KY_{115}	—	May 30, 2014	Haleakala	Pan-STARRS 1	·	860 m	MPC · JPL
861270	2014 KX_{116}	—	May 27, 2014	Haleakala	Pan-STARRS 1	·	1.0 km	MPC · JPL
861271	2014 KH_{117}	—	October 10, 2016	Mount Lemmon	Mount Lemmon Survey	·	1.7 km	MPC · JPL
861272	2014 KS_{117}	—	May 27, 2014	Haleakala	Pan-STARRS 1	H	300 m	MPC · JPL
861273	2014 KU_{117}	—	May 25, 2014	Haleakala	Pan-STARRS 1	·	2.9 km	MPC · JPL
861274	2014 KH_{118}	—	May 26, 2014	Haleakala	Pan-STARRS 1	PHO	740 m	MPC · JPL
861275	2014 KS_{118}	—	January 5, 2013	Cerro Tololo	D. E. Trilling, R. L. Allen	·	810 m	MPC · JPL
861276	2014 KQ_{120}	—	May 7, 2014	Haleakala	Pan-STARRS 1	·	2.0 km	MPC · JPL
861277	2014 KY_{120}	—	May 21, 2014	Haleakala	Pan-STARRS 1	KOR	890 m	MPC · JPL
861278	2014 KN_{121}	—	May 7, 2014	Haleakala	Pan-STARRS 1	·	1.3 km	MPC · JPL
861279	2014 KO_{121}	—	May 21, 2014	Haleakala	Pan-STARRS 1	·	1.0 km	MPC · JPL
861280	2014 KQ_{122}	—	May 21, 2014	Haleakala	Pan-STARRS 1	·	1.4 km	MPC · JPL
861281	2014 KS_{122}	—	September 23, 2015	Mount Lemmon	Mount Lemmon Survey	·	520 m	MPC · JPL
861282	2014 KL_{124}	—	May 25, 2014	Haleakala	Pan-STARRS 1	·	1.2 km	MPC · JPL
861283	2014 KD_{125}	—	September 23, 2011	Haleakala	Pan-STARRS 1	NYS	500 m	MPC · JPL
861284	2014 KT_{126}	—	May 23, 2014	Haleakala	Pan-STARRS 1	·	930 m	MPC · JPL
861285	2014 KN_{128}	—	May 24, 2014	Haleakala	Pan-STARRS 1	·	1.5 km	MPC · JPL
861286	2014 KT_{128}	—	May 25, 2014	Haleakala	Pan-STARRS 1	H	350 m	MPC · JPL
861287	2014 KY_{129}	—	May 21, 2014	Haleakala	Pan-STARRS 1	·	1.1 km	MPC · JPL
861288	2014 KB_{130}	—	May 24, 2014	Mount Lemmon	Mount Lemmon Survey	BRA	1.1 km	MPC · JPL
861289	2014 KL_{130}	—	May 7, 2014	Haleakala	Pan-STARRS 1	·	1.4 km	MPC · JPL
861290	2014 KZ_{130}	—	May 20, 2014	Haleakala	Pan-STARRS 1	KOR	1.1 km	MPC · JPL
861291	2014 KN_{131}	—	May 21, 2014	Haleakala	Pan-STARRS 1	·	1.2 km	MPC · JPL
861292	2014 KZ_{131}	—	May 21, 2014	Mount Lemmon	Mount Lemmon Survey	·	1.4 km	MPC · JPL
861293	2014 KH_{132}	—	May 20, 2014	Haleakala	Pan-STARRS 1	·	1.2 km	MPC · JPL
861294	2014 KW_{132}	—	May 24, 2014	Haleakala	Pan-STARRS 1	·	1.5 km	MPC · JPL
861295	2014 KH_{133}	—	May 23, 2014	Haleakala	Pan-STARRS 1	·	1.6 km	MPC · JPL
861296	2014 KL_{133}	—	May 21, 2014	Haleakala	Pan-STARRS 1	·	1.1 km	MPC · JPL
861297	2014 KO_{133}	—	May 21, 2014	Mount Lemmon	Mount Lemmon Survey	PAD	1.3 km	MPC · JPL
861298	2014 KC_{134}	—	May 24, 2014	Haleakala	Pan-STARRS 1	WIT	700 m	MPC · JPL
861299	2014 KA_{135}	—	May 25, 2014	Haleakala	Pan-STARRS 1	H	350 m	MPC · JPL
861300	2014 KK_{135}	—	April 23, 2014	Cerro Tololo	DECam	·	670 m	MPC · JPL

== 861301–861400 ==
back to top

Designation			Discovery			Properties		Ref
Permanent	Provisional	Named after	Date	Site	Discoverer(s)	Category	Diam.	Ref
861301	2014 KO_{135}	—	May 21, 2014	Haleakala	Pan-STARRS 1	MAS	550 m	MPC · JPL
861302	2014 KG_{136}	—	May 21, 2014	Haleakala	Pan-STARRS 1	·	840 m	MPC · JPL
861303	2014 KV_{136}	—	May 20, 2014	Haleakala	Pan-STARRS 1	·	590 m	MPC · JPL
861304	2014 KB_{137}	—	May 28, 2014	Haleakala	Pan-STARRS 1	V	420 m	MPC · JPL
861305	2014 KD_{137}	—	May 28, 2014	Mount Lemmon	Mount Lemmon Survey	PHO	630 m	MPC · JPL
861306	2014 KO_{137}	—	May 28, 2014	Haleakala	Pan-STARRS 1	·	1.0 km	MPC · JPL
861307	2014 KK_{138}	—	May 21, 2014	Mount Lemmon	Mount Lemmon Survey	·	520 m	MPC · JPL
861308	2014 KQ_{138}	—	May 27, 2014	Mount Lemmon	Mount Lemmon Survey	·	520 m	MPC · JPL
861309	2014 KA_{139}	—	May 21, 2014	Haleakala	Pan-STARRS 1	·	860 m	MPC · JPL
861310	2014 KG_{139}	—	May 20, 2014	Haleakala	Pan-STARRS 1	·	1.0 km	MPC · JPL
861311	2014 KT_{139}	—	May 27, 2014	Haleakala	Pan-STARRS 1	LUT	2.7 km	MPC · JPL
861312	2014 KQ_{141}	—	May 28, 2014	Haleakala	Pan-STARRS 1	·	2.0 km	MPC · JPL
861313	2014 KM_{144}	—	May 21, 2014	Haleakala	Pan-STARRS 1	·	610 m	MPC · JPL
861314	2014 KQ_{144}	—	May 25, 2014	Haleakala	Pan-STARRS 1	·	1.1 km	MPC · JPL
861315	2014 KA_{145}	—	May 23, 2014	Haleakala	Pan-STARRS 1	·	560 m	MPC · JPL
861316	2014 KV_{145}	—	May 20, 2014	Haleakala	Pan-STARRS 1	NYS	680 m	MPC · JPL
861317	2014 KD_{146}	—	May 23, 2014	Haleakala	Pan-STARRS 1	·	490 m	MPC · JPL
861318	2014 KM_{146}	—	May 18, 2014	Haleakala	Pan-STARRS 1	·	1.0 km	MPC · JPL
861319	2014 KU_{148}	—	May 23, 2014	Haleakala	Pan-STARRS 1	V	370 m	MPC · JPL
861320	2014 KO_{149}	—	May 20, 2014	Haleakala	Pan-STARRS 1	·	510 m	MPC · JPL
861321	2014 KL_{157}	—	May 20, 2014	Haleakala	Pan-STARRS 1	V	480 m	MPC · JPL
861322	2014 KJ_{168}	—	May 28, 2014	Haleakala	Pan-STARRS 1	·	490 m	MPC · JPL
861323	2014 KC_{169}	—	May 31, 2014	Haleakala	Pan-STARRS 1	·	1.6 km	MPC · JPL
861324	2014 KR_{175}	—	May 31, 2014	Haleakala	Pan-STARRS 1	·	1.4 km	MPC · JPL
861325	2014 LJ_{3}	—	August 23, 2011	Haleakala	Pan-STARRS 1	·	550 m	MPC · JPL
861326	2014 LR_{3}	—	June 2, 2014	Mount Lemmon	Mount Lemmon Survey	·	850 m	MPC · JPL
861327	2014 LB_{5}	—	May 8, 2014	Haleakala	Pan-STARRS 1	AGN	980 m	MPC · JPL
861328	2014 LR_{6}	—	June 2, 2014	Mount Lemmon	Mount Lemmon Survey	KOR	1.1 km	MPC · JPL
861329	2014 LS_{7}	—	June 2, 2014	Mount Lemmon	Mount Lemmon Survey	·	1.4 km	MPC · JPL
861330	2014 LC_{8}	—	May 7, 2014	Haleakala	Pan-STARRS 1	·	1.3 km	MPC · JPL
861331	2014 LY_{8}	—	May 7, 2014	Haleakala	Pan-STARRS 1	V	410 m	MPC · JPL
861332	2014 LC_{10}	—	April 3, 2014	Haleakala	Pan-STARRS 1	·	890 m	MPC · JPL
861333	2014 LR_{12}	—	June 3, 2014	Haleakala	Pan-STARRS 1	·	700 m	MPC · JPL
861334	2014 LV_{13}	—	August 7, 2004	Palomar	NEAT	·	460 m	MPC · JPL
861335	2014 LG_{15}	—	May 7, 2014	Haleakala	Pan-STARRS 1	TIN	800 m	MPC · JPL
861336	2014 LZ_{15}	—	May 7, 2014	Haleakala	Pan-STARRS 1	·	990 m	MPC · JPL
861337	2014 LM_{16}	—	September 23, 2011	Haleakala	Pan-STARRS 1	·	670 m	MPC · JPL
861338	2014 LR_{21}	—	June 5, 2014	Haleakala	Pan-STARRS 1	H	320 m	MPC · JPL
861339	2014 LT_{21}	—	May 7, 2014	Haleakala	Pan-STARRS 1	·	1.1 km	MPC · JPL
861340	2014 LB_{23}	—	May 7, 2014	Haleakala	Pan-STARRS 1	·	1.3 km	MPC · JPL
861341	2014 LZ_{24}	—	June 8, 2014	Mount Lemmon	Mount Lemmon Survey	·	930 m	MPC · JPL
861342	2014 LN_{26}	—	June 7, 2010	Siding Spring	SSS	·	1.4 km	MPC · JPL
861343	2014 LU_{32}	—	June 4, 2014	Haleakala	Pan-STARRS 1	H	420 m	MPC · JPL
861344	2014 LZ_{32}	—	June 5, 2014	Haleakala	Pan-STARRS 1	PHO	740 m	MPC · JPL
861345	2014 LC_{33}	—	June 5, 2014	Haleakala	Pan-STARRS 1	·	1.2 km	MPC · JPL
861346	2014 LS_{33}	—	June 2, 2014	Haleakala	Pan-STARRS 1	BRG	1.0 km	MPC · JPL
861347	2014 LY_{33}	—	June 5, 2014	Haleakala	Pan-STARRS 1	·	1.1 km	MPC · JPL
861348	2014 LJ_{34}	—	June 6, 2014	Roque de los Muchachos	EURONEAR	(2076)	440 m	MPC · JPL
861349	2014 LX_{34}	—	June 3, 2014	Haleakala	Pan-STARRS 1	H	370 m	MPC · JPL
861350	2014 LN_{35}	—	June 4, 2014	Haleakala	Pan-STARRS 1	H	330 m	MPC · JPL
861351	2014 LA_{36}	—	June 3, 2014	Haleakala	Pan-STARRS 1	·	1.2 km	MPC · JPL
861352	2014 LB_{36}	—	June 2, 2014	Haleakala	Pan-STARRS 1	·	1.4 km	MPC · JPL
861353	2014 LC_{36}	—	June 5, 2014	Haleakala	Pan-STARRS 1	·	2.3 km	MPC · JPL
861354	2014 LD_{36}	—	June 1, 2014	Haleakala	Pan-STARRS 1	·	1.6 km	MPC · JPL
861355	2014 LV_{36}	—	June 2, 2014	Mount Lemmon	Mount Lemmon Survey	·	490 m	MPC · JPL
861356	2014 LF_{37}	—	June 1, 2014	ESA OGS	ESA OGS	·	1.0 km	MPC · JPL
861357	2014 LG_{37}	—	June 2, 2014	Haleakala	Pan-STARRS 1	·	870 m	MPC · JPL
861358	2014 LX_{37}	—	June 8, 2014	Mount Lemmon	Mount Lemmon Survey	H	400 m	MPC · JPL
861359	2014 LT_{41}	—	June 2, 2014	Haleakala	Pan-STARRS 1	BRG	1.2 km	MPC · JPL
861360	2014 LX_{41}	—	March 21, 2010	Kitt Peak	Spacewatch	·	810 m	MPC · JPL
861361	2014 MT_{3}	—	May 3, 2014	Haleakala	Pan-STARRS 1	·	1.1 km	MPC · JPL
861362	2014 ML_{4}	—	June 4, 2014	Haleakala	Pan-STARRS 1	·	570 m	MPC · JPL
861363	2014 MH_{5}	—	March 28, 2014	Mount Lemmon	Mount Lemmon Survey	·	500 m	MPC · JPL
861364	2014 ML_{5}	—	June 21, 2014	Kitt Peak	Spacewatch	·	530 m	MPC · JPL
861365	2014 MX_{5}	—	June 23, 2014	Mount Lemmon	Mount Lemmon Survey	·	550 m	MPC · JPL
861366	2014 MC_{6}	—	June 15, 2014	Haleakala	Pan-STARRS 1	APO	460 m	MPC · JPL
861367	2014 MU_{7}	—	May 7, 2014	Haleakala	Pan-STARRS 1	·	540 m	MPC · JPL
861368	2014 MA_{10}	—	September 2, 2011	Haleakala	Pan-STARRS 1	·	470 m	MPC · JPL
861369	2014 MY_{10}	—	June 21, 2014	Mount Lemmon	Mount Lemmon Survey	·	2.2 km	MPC · JPL
861370	2014 MB_{12}	—	May 14, 2007	Mount Lemmon	Mount Lemmon Survey	·	490 m	MPC · JPL
861371	2014 MA_{13}	—	October 10, 2007	Kitt Peak	Spacewatch	NYS	670 m	MPC · JPL
861372	2014 ML_{19}	—	January 18, 2008	Kitt Peak	Spacewatch	H	360 m	MPC · JPL
861373	2014 MP_{20}	—	December 6, 2012	Kitt Peak	Spacewatch	H	420 m	MPC · JPL
861374	2014 ML_{21}	—	September 25, 2011	Haleakala	Pan-STARRS 1	·	610 m	MPC · JPL
861375	2014 MG_{22}	—	June 4, 2014	Haleakala	Pan-STARRS 1	·	590 m	MPC · JPL
861376	2014 MB_{23}	—	May 7, 2014	Haleakala	Pan-STARRS 1	·	1.0 km	MPC · JPL
861377	2014 MB_{26}	—	February 9, 2013	Haleakala	Pan-STARRS 1	·	960 m	MPC · JPL
861378	2014 MP_{26}	—	June 27, 2014	Haleakala	Pan-STARRS 1	H	340 m	MPC · JPL
861379	2014 MS_{28}	—	May 9, 2014	Haleakala	Pan-STARRS 1	PHO	690 m	MPC · JPL
861380	2014 MA_{34}	—	June 26, 2014	ESA OGS	ESA OGS	·	1.9 km	MPC · JPL
861381	2014 MF_{34}	—	May 7, 2014	Haleakala	Pan-STARRS 1	EUN	800 m	MPC · JPL
861382	2014 MO_{35}	—	August 4, 2005	Palomar	NEAT	·	1.5 km	MPC · JPL
861383	2014 MV_{39}	—	June 27, 2014	Haleakala	Pan-STARRS 1	·	1.2 km	MPC · JPL
861384	2014 MG_{43}	—	June 26, 2014	Mount Lemmon	Mount Lemmon Survey	·	500 m	MPC · JPL
861385	2014 MC_{50}	—	May 4, 2014	Haleakala	Pan-STARRS 1	EUN	740 m	MPC · JPL
861386	2014 MD_{50}	—	November 11, 2010	Mount Lemmon	Mount Lemmon Survey	·	1.4 km	MPC · JPL
861387	2014 MT_{50}	—	January 2, 2012	Kitt Peak	Spacewatch	·	2.4 km	MPC · JPL
861388	2014 MN_{55}	—	May 27, 2014	Mount Lemmon	Mount Lemmon Survey	·	660 m	MPC · JPL
861389	2014 MM_{56}	—	June 2, 2014	Mount Lemmon	Mount Lemmon Survey	·	1.8 km	MPC · JPL
861390	2014 MM_{58}	—	September 13, 2007	Mount Lemmon	Mount Lemmon Survey	·	610 m	MPC · JPL
861391	2014 MV_{58}	—	June 29, 2014	Mount Lemmon	Mount Lemmon Survey	NYS	640 m	MPC · JPL
861392	2014 MA_{59}	—	June 30, 2014	Kitt Peak	Spacewatch	·	2.0 km	MPC · JPL
861393	2014 MD_{59}	—	June 3, 2014	Haleakala	Pan-STARRS 1	H	490 m	MPC · JPL
861394	2014 MP_{59}	—	March 17, 2005	Kitt Peak	Spacewatch	·	900 m	MPC · JPL
861395	2014 MF_{60}	—	June 30, 2014	Haleakala	Pan-STARRS 1	·	2.3 km	MPC · JPL
861396	2014 MC_{61}	—	June 27, 2014	Haleakala	Pan-STARRS 1	·	680 m	MPC · JPL
861397	2014 MY_{61}	—	June 27, 2014	Haleakala	Pan-STARRS 1	·	790 m	MPC · JPL
861398	2014 MM_{62}	—	June 28, 2014	Kitt Peak	Spacewatch	·	720 m	MPC · JPL
861399	2014 MN_{62}	—	June 28, 2014	Kitt Peak	Spacewatch	·	1.8 km	MPC · JPL
861400	2014 MP_{64}	—	June 30, 2014	Haleakala	Pan-STARRS 1	·	1.1 km	MPC · JPL

== 861401–861500 ==
back to top

Designation			Discovery			Properties		Ref
Permanent	Provisional	Named after	Date	Site	Discoverer(s)	Category	Diam.	Ref
861401	2014 MP_{65}	—	June 29, 2014	Mount Lemmon	Mount Lemmon Survey	·	2.1 km	MPC · JPL
861402	2014 MA_{69}	—	May 5, 2014	Mount Lemmon	Mount Lemmon Survey	·	1.2 km	MPC · JPL
861403	2014 MU_{70}	—	January 10, 2013	Haleakala	Pan-STARRS 1	H	340 m	MPC · JPL
861404	2014 MM_{71}	—	June 29, 2014	Haleakala	Pan-STARRS 1	·	2.3 km	MPC · JPL
861405	2014 MZ_{73}	—	July 5, 2005	Mount Lemmon	Mount Lemmon Survey	·	1.7 km	MPC · JPL
861406	2014 MK_{74}	—	August 23, 2003	Palomar	NEAT	·	2.0 km	MPC · JPL
861407	2014 MR_{74}	—	June 23, 2014	Mount Lemmon	Mount Lemmon Survey	·	1.5 km	MPC · JPL
861408	2014 MP_{75}	—	June 27, 2014	ESA OGS	ESA OGS	·	1.2 km	MPC · JPL
861409	2014 MU_{75}	—	June 27, 2014	Haleakala	Pan-STARRS 1	·	1.3 km	MPC · JPL
861410	2014 MZ_{75}	—	January 27, 2012	Mount Lemmon	Mount Lemmon Survey	ADE	1.3 km	MPC · JPL
861411	2014 MB_{76}	—	June 27, 2014	Haleakala	Pan-STARRS 1	·	2.2 km	MPC · JPL
861412	2014 MB_{77}	—	August 27, 2009	Kitt Peak	Spacewatch	·	1.6 km	MPC · JPL
861413	2014 ML_{78}	—	June 27, 2014	Haleakala	Pan-STARRS 1	·	640 m	MPC · JPL
861414	2014 MO_{78}	—	November 12, 2006	Lulin	LUSS	·	1.0 km	MPC · JPL
861415	2014 MA_{79}	—	June 26, 2014	Mount Lemmon	Mount Lemmon Survey	·	610 m	MPC · JPL
861416	2014 MF_{79}	—	June 28, 2014	Haleakala	Pan-STARRS 1	·	2.0 km	MPC · JPL
861417	2014 MG_{79}	—	June 24, 2014	Haleakala	Pan-STARRS 1	·	600 m	MPC · JPL
861418	2014 MH_{80}	—	June 24, 2014	Haleakala	Pan-STARRS 1	·	1.2 km	MPC · JPL
861419	2014 MS_{80}	—	June 24, 2014	Haleakala	Pan-STARRS 1	·	1.4 km	MPC · JPL
861420	2014 MO_{81}	—	June 21, 2014	Haleakala	Pan-STARRS 1	·	540 m	MPC · JPL
861421	2014 MU_{81}	—	June 24, 2014	Mount Lemmon	Mount Lemmon Survey	PHO	750 m	MPC · JPL
861422	2014 MA_{82}	—	July 4, 2014	Haleakala	Pan-STARRS 1	EUN	960 m	MPC · JPL
861423	2014 MP_{83}	—	January 28, 2017	Haleakala	Pan-STARRS 1	EUN	860 m	MPC · JPL
861424	2014 MS_{83}	—	June 24, 2014	Mount Lemmon	Mount Lemmon Survey	·	1.4 km	MPC · JPL
861425	2014 MZ_{83}	—	June 28, 2014	Haleakala	Pan-STARRS 1	·	1.3 km	MPC · JPL
861426	2014 MB_{84}	—	June 29, 2014	Haleakala	Pan-STARRS 1	EUN	860 m	MPC · JPL
861427	2014 MH_{84}	—	October 10, 2015	Haleakala	Pan-STARRS 1	·	1.2 km	MPC · JPL
861428	2014 MX_{84}	—	June 24, 2014	Haleakala	Pan-STARRS 1	·	660 m	MPC · JPL
861429	2014 MA_{85}	—	June 27, 2014	Haleakala	Pan-STARRS 1	MAS	520 m	MPC · JPL
861430	2014 MM_{85}	—	June 27, 2014	Haleakala	Pan-STARRS 1	·	490 m	MPC · JPL
861431	2014 MS_{85}	—	June 27, 2014	Haleakala	Pan-STARRS 1	·	1.5 km	MPC · JPL
861432	2014 MX_{86}	—	June 30, 2014	Haleakala	Pan-STARRS 1	PHO	790 m	MPC · JPL
861433	2014 MY_{86}	—	June 24, 2014	Haleakala	Pan-STARRS 1	EMA	2.4 km	MPC · JPL
861434	2014 MN_{87}	—	June 24, 2014	Haleakala	Pan-STARRS 1	EUN	880 m	MPC · JPL
861435	2014 MR_{88}	—	June 23, 2014	Mount Lemmon	Mount Lemmon Survey	·	1.7 km	MPC · JPL
861436	2014 MU_{88}	—	June 26, 2014	Haleakala	Pan-STARRS 1	NYS	800 m	MPC · JPL
861437	2014 MD_{89}	—	June 30, 2014	Haleakala	Pan-STARRS 1	HNS	850 m	MPC · JPL
861438	2014 MO_{90}	—	June 24, 2014	Haleakala	Pan-STARRS 1	·	730 m	MPC · JPL
861439	2014 MW_{90}	—	June 28, 2014	Haleakala	Pan-STARRS 1	·	710 m	MPC · JPL
861440	2014 MZ_{90}	—	June 23, 2014	Mount Lemmon	Mount Lemmon Survey	(2076)	520 m	MPC · JPL
861441	2014 MD_{92}	—	June 24, 2014	Haleakala	Pan-STARRS 1	·	2.1 km	MPC · JPL
861442	2014 MK_{93}	—	June 28, 2014	Haleakala	Pan-STARRS 1	·	2.1 km	MPC · JPL
861443	2014 MN_{93}	—	June 30, 2014	Haleakala	Pan-STARRS 1	EOS	1.2 km	MPC · JPL
861444	2014 MP_{93}	—	June 24, 2014	Haleakala	Pan-STARRS 1	·	1.7 km	MPC · JPL
861445	2014 MR_{93}	—	June 24, 2014	Haleakala	Pan-STARRS 1	·	1.4 km	MPC · JPL
861446	2014 MA_{94}	—	June 30, 2014	Haleakala	Pan-STARRS 1	EOS	1.4 km	MPC · JPL
861447	2014 ME_{94}	—	June 23, 2014	Mount Lemmon	Mount Lemmon Survey	·	1.7 km	MPC · JPL
861448	2014 MF_{94}	—	June 23, 2014	Mount Lemmon	Mount Lemmon Survey	·	1.5 km	MPC · JPL
861449	2014 MK_{94}	—	June 30, 2014	Haleakala	Pan-STARRS 1	·	1.4 km	MPC · JPL
861450	2014 MS_{94}	—	June 20, 2014	Haleakala	Pan-STARRS 1	·	570 m	MPC · JPL
861451	2014 MU_{95}	—	June 27, 2014	Haleakala	Pan-STARRS 1	·	1.0 km	MPC · JPL
861452	2014 MZ_{95}	—	June 21, 2014	Mount Lemmon	Mount Lemmon Survey	·	1.0 km	MPC · JPL
861453	2014 MS_{96}	—	June 27, 2014	Haleakala	Pan-STARRS 1	NYS	710 m	MPC · JPL
861454	2014 MU_{96}	—	June 21, 2014	Mount Lemmon	Mount Lemmon Survey	·	570 m	MPC · JPL
861455	2014 MA_{97}	—	June 24, 2014	Haleakala	Pan-STARRS 1	·	1.6 km	MPC · JPL
861456	2014 MJ_{97}	—	June 29, 2014	Haleakala	Pan-STARRS 1	·	590 m	MPC · JPL
861457	2014 MK_{97}	—	June 29, 2014	Haleakala	Pan-STARRS 1	THM	1.4 km	MPC · JPL
861458	2014 MN_{97}	—	June 29, 2014	Haleakala	Pan-STARRS 1	NYS	620 m	MPC · JPL
861459	2014 MS_{97}	—	June 20, 2014	Haleakala	Pan-STARRS 1	·	490 m	MPC · JPL
861460	2014 MX_{99}	—	June 18, 2014	Haleakala	Pan-STARRS 1	·	920 m	MPC · JPL
861461	2014 MA_{101}	—	June 28, 2014	Haleakala	Pan-STARRS 1	·	1.4 km	MPC · JPL
861462	2014 MJ_{102}	—	September 13, 2007	Mount Lemmon	Mount Lemmon Survey	MAS	580 m	MPC · JPL
861463	2014 MU_{102}	—	June 30, 2014	Haleakala	Pan-STARRS 1	PHO	580 m	MPC · JPL
861464	2014 MF_{105}	—	June 30, 2014	Haleakala	Pan-STARRS 1	·	1.4 km	MPC · JPL
861465	2014 NX_{4}	—	July 1, 2014	Haleakala	Pan-STARRS 1	·	1.3 km	MPC · JPL
861466	2014 NG_{6}	—	April 9, 2010	Mount Lemmon	Mount Lemmon Survey	NYS	680 m	MPC · JPL
861467	2014 NN_{6}	—	July 1, 2014	Haleakala	Pan-STARRS 1	PHO	720 m	MPC · JPL
861468	2014 NT_{11}	—	June 21, 2014	Haleakala	Pan-STARRS 1	·	1.7 km	MPC · JPL
861469	2014 NG_{12}	—	July 1, 2014	Haleakala	Pan-STARRS 1	·	1.7 km	MPC · JPL
861470	2014 NO_{12}	—	July 1, 2014	Haleakala	Pan-STARRS 1	·	770 m	MPC · JPL
861471	2014 NQ_{13}	—	October 19, 2011	Kitt Peak	Spacewatch	·	760 m	MPC · JPL
861472	2014 NV_{13}	—	July 1, 2014	Haleakala	Pan-STARRS 1	·	1.5 km	MPC · JPL
861473	2014 NA_{15}	—	April 1, 2008	Kitt Peak	Spacewatch	·	1.8 km	MPC · JPL
861474	2014 NO_{20}	—	July 2, 2014	Haleakala	Pan-STARRS 1	PHO	740 m	MPC · JPL
861475	2014 NU_{20}	—	September 1, 2010	Mount Lemmon	Mount Lemmon Survey	(1547)	1.1 km	MPC · JPL
861476	2014 NX_{20}	—	May 31, 2014	Haleakala	Pan-STARRS 1	·	1.4 km	MPC · JPL
861477	2014 NA_{21}	—	May 31, 2014	Haleakala	Pan-STARRS 1	·	1.4 km	MPC · JPL
861478	2014 NL_{21}	—	October 19, 2003	Kitt Peak	Spacewatch	·	2.3 km	MPC · JPL
861479	2014 NS_{23}	—	July 2, 2014	Haleakala	Pan-STARRS 1	·	630 m	MPC · JPL
861480	2014 NY_{24}	—	September 7, 2011	Kitt Peak	Spacewatch	·	450 m	MPC · JPL
861481	2014 NK_{25}	—	May 15, 2009	Mount Lemmon	Mount Lemmon Survey	·	1.6 km	MPC · JPL
861482	2014 NP_{25}	—	July 2, 2014	Haleakala	Pan-STARRS 1	·	690 m	MPC · JPL
861483	2014 ND_{26}	—	July 2, 2014	Haleakala	Pan-STARRS 1	·	1.4 km	MPC · JPL
861484	2014 NN_{26}	—	July 2, 2014	Haleakala	Pan-STARRS 1	·	690 m	MPC · JPL
861485	2014 NX_{26}	—	June 2, 2014	Haleakala	Pan-STARRS 1	·	550 m	MPC · JPL
861486	2014 NM_{27}	—	July 2, 2014	Haleakala	Pan-STARRS 1	ELF	2.9 km	MPC · JPL
861487	2014 ND_{28}	—	July 2, 2014	Haleakala	Pan-STARRS 1	·	1.1 km	MPC · JPL
861488	2014 NW_{28}	—	July 2, 2014	Haleakala	Pan-STARRS 1	·	1.8 km	MPC · JPL
861489	2014 NY_{28}	—	October 8, 2007	Mount Lemmon	Mount Lemmon Survey	MAS	430 m	MPC · JPL
861490	2014 NK_{29}	—	July 2, 2014	Haleakala	Pan-STARRS 1	·	1.7 km	MPC · JPL
861491	2014 NV_{30}	—	June 2, 2014	Haleakala	Pan-STARRS 1	·	490 m	MPC · JPL
861492	2014 NW_{31}	—	March 15, 2013	Kitt Peak	Spacewatch	·	1.7 km	MPC · JPL
861493	2014 NE_{32}	—	June 2, 2014	Haleakala	Pan-STARRS 1	·	530 m	MPC · JPL
861494	2014 NF_{32}	—	June 2, 2014	Haleakala	Pan-STARRS 1	·	740 m	MPC · JPL
861495	2014 NO_{33}	—	August 8, 2010	XuYi	PMO NEO Survey Program	RAF	750 m	MPC · JPL
861496	2014 NU_{33}	—	June 4, 2014	Haleakala	Pan-STARRS 1	·	2.0 km	MPC · JPL
861497	2014 NJ_{34}	—	September 17, 2004	Anderson Mesa	LONEOS	·	1.5 km	MPC · JPL
861498	2014 NV_{35}	—	June 8, 2005	Siding Spring	SSS	·	1.5 km	MPC · JPL
861499	2014 ND_{37}	—	July 2, 2014	Haleakala	Pan-STARRS 1	·	410 m	MPC · JPL
861500	2014 NO_{37}	—	April 19, 2006	Kitt Peak	Spacewatch	·	830 m	MPC · JPL

== 861501–861600 ==
back to top

Designation			Discovery			Properties		Ref
Permanent	Provisional	Named after	Date	Site	Discoverer(s)	Category	Diam.	Ref
861501	2014 NB_{38}	—	October 25, 2011	Haleakala	Pan-STARRS 1	V	420 m	MPC · JPL
861502	2014 ND_{39}	—	July 2, 2014	Mount Lemmon	Mount Lemmon Survey	PHO	960 m	MPC · JPL
861503	2014 NE_{40}	—	June 3, 2014	Haleakala	Pan-STARRS 1	·	1.6 km	MPC · JPL
861504	2014 NH_{40}	—	June 3, 2014	Haleakala	Pan-STARRS 1	TIN	900 m	MPC · JPL
861505	2014 NM_{41}	—	June 1, 2014	Haleakala	Pan-STARRS 1	·	1.2 km	MPC · JPL
861506	2014 NS_{41}	—	July 3, 2014	Haleakala	Pan-STARRS 1	·	1.6 km	MPC · JPL
861507	2014 NT_{41}	—	July 3, 2014	Haleakala	Pan-STARRS 1	·	1.9 km	MPC · JPL
861508	2014 NP_{42}	—	July 3, 2014	Haleakala	Pan-STARRS 1	·	1.9 km	MPC · JPL
861509	2014 NX_{45}	—	June 28, 2014	Haleakala	Pan-STARRS 1	·	490 m	MPC · JPL
861510	2014 NH_{46}	—	June 29, 2014	Haleakala	Pan-STARRS 1	·	1.4 km	MPC · JPL
861511	2014 NO_{46}	—	June 24, 2014	Haleakala	Pan-STARRS 1	·	940 m	MPC · JPL
861512	2014 NO_{47}	—	June 22, 2014	Haleakala	Pan-STARRS 1	·	2.2 km	MPC · JPL
861513	2014 NP_{48}	—	July 3, 2014	Haleakala	Pan-STARRS 1	EUP	2.0 km	MPC · JPL
861514	2014 NG_{49}	—	July 3, 2014	Haleakala	Pan-STARRS 1	·	2.1 km	MPC · JPL
861515	2014 NZ_{49}	—	June 24, 2014	Mount Lemmon	Mount Lemmon Survey	EOS	1.5 km	MPC · JPL
861516	2014 NW_{50}	—	July 4, 2014	Haleakala	Pan-STARRS 1	·	680 m	MPC · JPL
861517	2014 NC_{51}	—	August 24, 2003	Cerro Tololo	Deep Ecliptic Survey	·	870 m	MPC · JPL
861518	2014 NW_{51}	—	June 26, 2014	Haleakala	Pan-STARRS 1	·	610 m	MPC · JPL
861519	2014 NP_{52}	—	July 2, 2014	Haleakala	Pan-STARRS 1	H	410 m	MPC · JPL
861520	2014 NA_{53}	—	June 2, 2014	Haleakala	Pan-STARRS 1	·	710 m	MPC · JPL
861521	2014 ND_{53}	—	July 4, 2014	Haleakala	Pan-STARRS 1	·	2.3 km	MPC · JPL
861522	2014 NU_{54}	—	June 28, 2014	Haleakala	Pan-STARRS 1	MAR	740 m	MPC · JPL
861523	2014 NW_{55}	—	October 8, 2007	Mount Lemmon	Mount Lemmon Survey	·	710 m	MPC · JPL
861524	2014 NU_{56}	—	April 4, 2008	Kitt Peak	Spacewatch	·	1.8 km	MPC · JPL
861525	2014 NZ_{56}	—	January 14, 2011	Mount Lemmon	Mount Lemmon Survey	EOS	1.3 km	MPC · JPL
861526	2014 NB_{57}	—	August 14, 2007	Siding Spring	SSS	·	700 m	MPC · JPL
861527	2014 NX_{57}	—	July 6, 2014	Haleakala	Pan-STARRS 1	·	1.2 km	MPC · JPL
861528	2014 NK_{58}	—	July 6, 2014	Haleakala	Pan-STARRS 1	TEL	960 m	MPC · JPL
861529	2014 NJ_{60}	—	September 30, 2010	Mount Lemmon	Mount Lemmon Survey	·	1.3 km	MPC · JPL
861530	2014 NR_{60}	—	June 5, 2014	Haleakala	Pan-STARRS 1	·	550 m	MPC · JPL
861531	2014 NC_{61}	—	July 7, 2014	Haleakala	Pan-STARRS 1	·	480 m	MPC · JPL
861532	2014 NA_{63}	—	January 18, 2013	Mount Lemmon	Mount Lemmon Survey	(5)	900 m	MPC · JPL
861533	2014 NL_{65}	—	September 18, 2001	Anderson Mesa	LONEOS	·	420 m	MPC · JPL
861534	2014 NH_{66}	—	July 7, 2014	Haleakala	Pan-STARRS 1	H	340 m	MPC · JPL
861535	2014 NM_{66}	—	July 3, 2014	Haleakala	Pan-STARRS 1	·	1.6 km	MPC · JPL
861536	2014 NR_{66}	—	July 7, 2014	Haleakala	Pan-STARRS 1	·	1.4 km	MPC · JPL
861537	2014 NG_{68}	—	July 7, 2014	Haleakala	Pan-STARRS 1	·	1.5 km	MPC · JPL
861538	2014 NT_{68}	—	April 6, 2013	Mount Lemmon	Mount Lemmon Survey	·	1.8 km	MPC · JPL
861539	2014 NT_{69}	—	July 1, 2014	Haleakala	Pan-STARRS 1	·	1.0 km	MPC · JPL
861540	2014 NX_{69}	—	July 1, 2014	Haleakala	Pan-STARRS 1	URS	2.1 km	MPC · JPL
861541	2014 NN_{70}	—	July 3, 2014	Haleakala	Pan-STARRS 1	·	1.4 km	MPC · JPL
861542	2014 NW_{71}	—	July 7, 2014	Haleakala	Pan-STARRS 1	·	1.7 km	MPC · JPL
861543	2014 NH_{74}	—	July 7, 2014	Haleakala	Pan-STARRS 1	·	580 m	MPC · JPL
861544	2014 NV_{74}	—	July 7, 2014	Haleakala	Pan-STARRS 1	EOS	1.5 km	MPC · JPL
861545	2014 NJ_{77}	—	July 4, 2014	Haleakala	Pan-STARRS 1	·	1.3 km	MPC · JPL
861546	2014 NV_{77}	—	July 9, 2014	Haleakala	Pan-STARRS 1	·	820 m	MPC · JPL
861547	2014 NN_{78}	—	July 1, 2014	Haleakala	Pan-STARRS 1	·	1.5 km	MPC · JPL
861548	2014 ND_{80}	—	July 1, 2014	Haleakala	Pan-STARRS 1	KOR	950 m	MPC · JPL
861549	2014 NN_{80}	—	July 2, 2014	Haleakala	Pan-STARRS 1	·	1.3 km	MPC · JPL
861550	2014 NQ_{80}	—	July 7, 2014	Haleakala	Pan-STARRS 1	·	410 m	MPC · JPL
861551	2014 NX_{80}	—	July 8, 2014	Haleakala	Pan-STARRS 1	·	700 m	MPC · JPL
861552	2014 NM_{81}	—	July 8, 2014	Haleakala	Pan-STARRS 1	·	2.9 km	MPC · JPL
861553	2014 NS_{81}	—	July 1, 2014	Haleakala	Pan-STARRS 1	·	2.2 km	MPC · JPL
861554	2014 NC_{82}	—	July 1, 2014	Haleakala	Pan-STARRS 1	·	910 m	MPC · JPL
861555	2014 NE_{82}	—	June 24, 2014	Haleakala	Pan-STARRS 1	·	680 m	MPC · JPL
861556	2014 NS_{83}	—	July 5, 2014	Haleakala	Pan-STARRS 1	·	2.2 km	MPC · JPL
861557	2014 NW_{83}	—	July 8, 2014	Haleakala	Pan-STARRS 1	·	2.3 km	MPC · JPL
861558	2014 NB_{85}	—	July 7, 2014	Haleakala	Pan-STARRS 1	·	1.5 km	MPC · JPL
861559	2014 NT_{85}	—	July 4, 2014	Haleakala	Pan-STARRS 1	·	890 m	MPC · JPL
861560	2014 NC_{86}	—	July 4, 2014	Haleakala	Pan-STARRS 1	·	1.7 km	MPC · JPL
861561	2014 NJ_{86}	—	July 1, 2014	Haleakala	Pan-STARRS 1	·	1.3 km	MPC · JPL
861562	2014 NU_{86}	—	July 8, 2014	Haleakala	Pan-STARRS 1	·	1.8 km	MPC · JPL
861563	2014 NQ_{89}	—	July 7, 2014	Haleakala	Pan-STARRS 1	·	2.1 km	MPC · JPL
861564	2014 NV_{89}	—	July 8, 2014	Haleakala	Pan-STARRS 1	·	1.7 km	MPC · JPL
861565	2014 NU_{90}	—	July 7, 2014	Haleakala	Pan-STARRS 1	·	720 m	MPC · JPL
861566	2014 NG_{91}	—	July 8, 2014	Haleakala	Pan-STARRS 1	EOS	1.3 km	MPC · JPL
861567	2014 NT_{94}	—	July 8, 2014	Haleakala	Pan-STARRS 1	H	330 m	MPC · JPL
861568	2014 NS_{97}	—	July 8, 2014	Haleakala	Pan-STARRS 1	VER	2.0 km	MPC · JPL
861569	2014 NW_{98}	—	July 5, 2014	Haleakala	Pan-STARRS 1	·	2.1 km	MPC · JPL
861570	2014 OO_{5}	—	July 25, 2014	Haleakala	Pan-STARRS 1	·	460 m	MPC · JPL
861571	2014 OF_{7}	—	June 29, 2014	Haleakala	Pan-STARRS 1	·	470 m	MPC · JPL
861572	2014 OM_{7}	—	August 24, 2007	Kitt Peak	Spacewatch	·	850 m	MPC · JPL
861573	2014 ON_{7}	—	July 25, 2014	Haleakala	Pan-STARRS 1	·	1.4 km	MPC · JPL
861574	2014 OU_{7}	—	June 26, 2014	Haleakala	Pan-STARRS 1	·	1.4 km	MPC · JPL
861575	2014 OY_{12}	—	May 9, 2014	Haleakala	Pan-STARRS 1	·	1.4 km	MPC · JPL
861576	2014 OH_{16}	—	July 15, 2005	Mount Lemmon	Mount Lemmon Survey	·	1.1 km	MPC · JPL
861577	2014 OF_{17}	—	August 14, 2009	La Sagra	OAM	·	1.6 km	MPC · JPL
861578	2014 OE_{18}	—	July 25, 2014	Haleakala	Pan-STARRS 1	·	1.1 km	MPC · JPL
861579	2014 OJ_{18}	—	July 25, 2014	Haleakala	Pan-STARRS 1	EOS	1.2 km	MPC · JPL
861580	2014 ON_{20}	—	September 15, 2010	Mount Lemmon	Mount Lemmon Survey	·	970 m	MPC · JPL
861581	2014 OB_{21}	—	September 4, 2007	Mount Lemmon	Mount Lemmon Survey	·	500 m	MPC · JPL
861582	2014 OL_{23}	—	October 11, 2010	Mount Lemmon	Mount Lemmon Survey	NEM	1.4 km	MPC · JPL
861583	2014 ON_{24}	—	July 25, 2014	Haleakala	Pan-STARRS 1	·	590 m	MPC · JPL
861584	2014 OD_{25}	—	July 25, 2014	Haleakala	Pan-STARRS 1	·	1.4 km	MPC · JPL
861585	2014 OR_{25}	—	July 25, 2014	Haleakala	Pan-STARRS 1	·	980 m	MPC · JPL
861586	2014 OV_{25}	—	June 2, 2014	Haleakala	Pan-STARRS 1	·	510 m	MPC · JPL
861587	2014 OJ_{26}	—	July 25, 2014	Haleakala	Pan-STARRS 1	·	1.6 km	MPC · JPL
861588	2014 OR_{26}	—	September 14, 2007	Mount Lemmon	Mount Lemmon Survey	MAS	390 m	MPC · JPL
861589	2014 OY_{27}	—	September 24, 2011	Mount Lemmon	Mount Lemmon Survey	V	470 m	MPC · JPL
861590	2014 OG_{28}	—	July 25, 2014	Haleakala	Pan-STARRS 1	(1298)	1.7 km	MPC · JPL
861591	2014 OM_{29}	—	July 25, 2014	Haleakala	Pan-STARRS 1	HNS	680 m	MPC · JPL
861592	2014 OS_{32}	—	September 3, 2007	Catalina	CSS	·	640 m	MPC · JPL
861593	2014 OM_{35}	—	September 12, 2007	Kitt Peak	Spacewatch	·	550 m	MPC · JPL
861594	2014 OU_{35}	—	January 19, 2007	Mauna Kea	P. A. Wiegert	·	1.3 km	MPC · JPL
861595	2014 OS_{36}	—	July 3, 2014	Haleakala	Pan-STARRS 1	·	1.4 km	MPC · JPL
861596	2014 OK_{37}	—	July 25, 2014	Haleakala	Pan-STARRS 1	EOS	1.2 km	MPC · JPL
861597	2014 OS_{37}	—	June 20, 2014	Kitt Peak	Spacewatch	·	1.8 km	MPC · JPL
861598	2014 OP_{40}	—	June 27, 2014	Haleakala	Pan-STARRS 1	·	1.4 km	MPC · JPL
861599	2014 OF_{43}	—	August 10, 2007	Kitt Peak	Spacewatch	·	620 m	MPC · JPL
861600	2014 OF_{44}	—	March 26, 2006	Kitt Peak	Spacewatch	MAS	570 m	MPC · JPL

== 861601–861700 ==
back to top

Designation			Discovery			Properties		Ref
Permanent	Provisional	Named after	Date	Site	Discoverer(s)	Category	Diam.	Ref
861601	2014 OQ_{44}	—	July 2, 2014	Haleakala	Pan-STARRS 1	·	810 m	MPC · JPL
861602	2014 OR_{44}	—	July 4, 2014	Haleakala	Pan-STARRS 1	·	940 m	MPC · JPL
861603	2014 OV_{44}	—	April 20, 2010	Kitt Peak	Spacewatch	MAS	470 m	MPC · JPL
861604	2014 OZ_{45}	—	October 30, 2007	Kitt Peak	Spacewatch	MAS	560 m	MPC · JPL
861605	2014 OR_{47}	—	June 27, 2014	Haleakala	Pan-STARRS 1	·	1.1 km	MPC · JPL
861606	2014 OC_{49}	—	June 27, 2014	Haleakala	Pan-STARRS 1	EUN	840 m	MPC · JPL
861607	2014 OA_{50}	—	July 25, 2014	Haleakala	Pan-STARRS 1	·	2.9 km	MPC · JPL
861608	2014 OB_{50}	—	April 9, 2010	Kitt Peak	Spacewatch	NYS	650 m	MPC · JPL
861609	2014 OQ_{50}	—	July 25, 2014	Haleakala	Pan-STARRS 1	·	2.0 km	MPC · JPL
861610	2014 OF_{51}	—	July 25, 2014	Haleakala	Pan-STARRS 1	·	1.6 km	MPC · JPL
861611	2014 OS_{51}	—	September 12, 2007	Mount Lemmon	Mount Lemmon Survey	·	570 m	MPC · JPL
861612	2014 OM_{53}	—	August 18, 2009	Kitt Peak	Spacewatch	·	1.9 km	MPC · JPL
861613	2014 OP_{53}	—	January 23, 2006	Mount Lemmon	Mount Lemmon Survey	·	1.4 km	MPC · JPL
861614	2014 OZ_{54}	—	July 25, 2014	Haleakala	Pan-STARRS 1	·	1.9 km	MPC · JPL
861615	2014 OE_{55}	—	July 25, 2014	Haleakala	Pan-STARRS 1	·	880 m	MPC · JPL
861616	2014 OH_{55}	—	March 5, 2013	Haleakala	Pan-STARRS 1	·	1.3 km	MPC · JPL
861617	2014 ON_{55}	—	July 25, 2014	Haleakala	Pan-STARRS 1	·	1.3 km	MPC · JPL
861618	2014 OR_{55}	—	July 25, 2014	Haleakala	Pan-STARRS 1	·	1.2 km	MPC · JPL
861619	2014 OK_{56}	—	July 25, 2014	Haleakala	Pan-STARRS 1	·	720 m	MPC · JPL
861620	2014 OW_{57}	—	July 25, 2014	Haleakala	Pan-STARRS 1	·	560 m	MPC · JPL
861621	2014 OP_{59}	—	July 25, 2014	Haleakala	Pan-STARRS 1	·	1.5 km	MPC · JPL
861622	2014 OV_{59}	—	October 26, 2011	Haleakala	Pan-STARRS 1	·	750 m	MPC · JPL
861623	2014 OX_{60}	—	July 25, 2014	Haleakala	Pan-STARRS 1	·	760 m	MPC · JPL
861624	2014 OY_{60}	—	June 27, 2014	Haleakala	Pan-STARRS 1	BRA	1.1 km	MPC · JPL
861625	2014 OV_{64}	—	September 16, 2009	Mount Lemmon	Mount Lemmon Survey	·	1.9 km	MPC · JPL
861626	2014 OG_{67}	—	July 25, 2014	Haleakala	Pan-STARRS 1	·	860 m	MPC · JPL
861627	2014 OS_{68}	—	July 25, 2014	Haleakala	Pan-STARRS 1	·	2.7 km	MPC · JPL
861628	2014 OY_{68}	—	July 25, 2014	Haleakala	Pan-STARRS 1	·	2.0 km	MPC · JPL
861629	2014 OT_{75}	—	April 10, 2010	Mount Lemmon	Mount Lemmon Survey	·	520 m	MPC · JPL
861630	2014 OH_{76}	—	September 10, 2007	Kitt Peak	Spacewatch	V	430 m	MPC · JPL
861631	2014 OX_{78}	—	July 26, 2014	Haleakala	Pan-STARRS 1	·	770 m	MPC · JPL
861632	2014 OK_{82}	—	June 30, 2014	Haleakala	Pan-STARRS 1	TRE	1.8 km	MPC · JPL
861633	2014 OB_{84}	—	July 26, 2014	Haleakala	Pan-STARRS 1	·	990 m	MPC · JPL
861634	2014 OF_{84}	—	October 19, 2011	Kitt Peak	Spacewatch	·	780 m	MPC · JPL
861635	2014 OR_{84}	—	July 26, 2014	Haleakala	Pan-STARRS 1	·	1.5 km	MPC · JPL
861636	2014 OK_{86}	—	December 13, 2010	Mount Lemmon	Mount Lemmon Survey	EOS	1.2 km	MPC · JPL
861637	2014 OP_{86}	—	July 4, 2014	Haleakala	Pan-STARRS 1	·	1.6 km	MPC · JPL
861638	2014 OU_{86}	—	May 27, 2008	Kitt Peak	Spacewatch	·	1.7 km	MPC · JPL
861639	2014 OW_{86}	—	July 4, 2014	Haleakala	Pan-STARRS 1	·	990 m	MPC · JPL
861640	2014 OG_{87}	—	October 12, 2010	Mount Lemmon	Mount Lemmon Survey	·	1.2 km	MPC · JPL
861641	2014 OO_{87}	—	July 26, 2014	Haleakala	Pan-STARRS 1	·	1.7 km	MPC · JPL
861642	2014 OP_{87}	—	August 28, 2005	Kitt Peak	Spacewatch	·	1.3 km	MPC · JPL
861643	2014 OW_{89}	—	June 26, 2014	ESA OGS	ESA OGS	·	1.1 km	MPC · JPL
861644	2014 OZ_{90}	—	October 10, 2007	Mount Lemmon	Mount Lemmon Survey	·	670 m	MPC · JPL
861645	2014 OX_{91}	—	May 7, 2014	Haleakala	Pan-STARRS 1	·	1.5 km	MPC · JPL
861646	2014 ON_{95}	—	July 18, 2007	Mount Lemmon	Mount Lemmon Survey	·	560 m	MPC · JPL
861647	2014 OU_{95}	—	July 7, 2014	Haleakala	Pan-STARRS 1	H	470 m	MPC · JPL
861648	2014 OX_{95}	—	July 7, 2014	Haleakala	Pan-STARRS 1	·	2.0 km	MPC · JPL
861649	2014 ON_{98}	—	July 26, 2014	Haleakala	Pan-STARRS 1	·	800 m	MPC · JPL
861650	2014 OX_{98}	—	July 26, 2014	Haleakala	Pan-STARRS 1	·	1.3 km	MPC · JPL
861651	2014 OY_{99}	—	January 10, 2007	Kitt Peak	Spacewatch	(1547)	1.2 km	MPC · JPL
861652	2014 OT_{102}	—	July 26, 2014	Haleakala	Pan-STARRS 1	PHO	830 m	MPC · JPL
861653	2014 OU_{102}	—	October 10, 2007	Kitt Peak	Spacewatch	MAS	490 m	MPC · JPL
861654	2014 OB_{103}	—	January 19, 2013	Mount Lemmon	Mount Lemmon Survey	H	360 m	MPC · JPL
861655	2014 OD_{103}	—	July 26, 2014	Haleakala	Pan-STARRS 1	·	450 m	MPC · JPL
861656	2014 OL_{103}	—	July 7, 2014	Haleakala	Pan-STARRS 1	·	2.1 km	MPC · JPL
861657	2014 OD_{104}	—	June 28, 2014	Mount Lemmon	Mount Lemmon Survey	·	1.4 km	MPC · JPL
861658	2014 OX_{106}	—	July 27, 2014	Haleakala	Pan-STARRS 1	·	1.1 km	MPC · JPL
861659	2014 OZ_{106}	—	July 27, 2014	Haleakala	Pan-STARRS 1	·	640 m	MPC · JPL
861660	2014 OW_{109}	—	November 2, 2011	Mount Lemmon	Mount Lemmon Survey	V	440 m	MPC · JPL
861661	2014 OW_{110}	—	July 27, 2014	Haleakala	Pan-STARRS 1	·	670 m	MPC · JPL
861662	2014 OD_{112}	—	July 26, 2014	Haleakala	Pan-STARRS 1	H	320 m	MPC · JPL
861663	2014 OH_{114}	—	July 25, 2014	Haleakala	Pan-STARRS 1	·	1.3 km	MPC · JPL
861664	2014 OD_{115}	—	July 4, 2014	Haleakala	Pan-STARRS 1	·	1.5 km	MPC · JPL
861665	2014 OB_{117}	—	January 26, 2012	Mount Lemmon	Mount Lemmon Survey	·	1.4 km	MPC · JPL
861666	2014 OE_{118}	—	January 18, 2009	Kitt Peak	Spacewatch	·	500 m	MPC · JPL
861667	2014 OH_{118}	—	July 25, 2014	Haleakala	Pan-STARRS 1	·	1.2 km	MPC · JPL
861668	2014 OF_{119}	—	June 25, 2014	Mount Lemmon	Mount Lemmon Survey	·	1.4 km	MPC · JPL
861669	2014 OS_{121}	—	July 25, 2014	Haleakala	Pan-STARRS 1	·	1.5 km	MPC · JPL
861670	2014 OT_{121}	—	July 25, 2014	Haleakala	Pan-STARRS 1	·	1.4 km	MPC · JPL
861671	2014 OA_{122}	—	October 29, 2011	Kitt Peak	Spacewatch	·	660 m	MPC · JPL
861672	2014 OQ_{123}	—	July 25, 2014	Haleakala	Pan-STARRS 1	·	480 m	MPC · JPL
861673	2014 OZ_{124}	—	July 25, 2014	Haleakala	Pan-STARRS 1	·	1.4 km	MPC · JPL
861674	2014 OC_{125}	—	July 25, 2014	Haleakala	Pan-STARRS 1	·	1.2 km	MPC · JPL
861675	2014 ON_{125}	—	June 19, 2014	Kitt Peak	Spacewatch	·	770 m	MPC · JPL
861676	2014 OR_{128}	—	July 25, 2014	Haleakala	Pan-STARRS 1	·	2.2 km	MPC · JPL
861677	2014 OK_{131}	—	May 10, 2014	Haleakala	Pan-STARRS 1	·	1.3 km	MPC · JPL
861678	2014 ON_{131}	—	May 24, 2014	Haleakala	Pan-STARRS 1	·	1.4 km	MPC · JPL
861679	2014 OO_{132}	—	July 27, 2014	Haleakala	Pan-STARRS 1	·	1.5 km	MPC · JPL
861680	2014 OD_{133}	—	June 2, 2014	Haleakala	Pan-STARRS 1	·	1.2 km	MPC · JPL
861681	2014 OJ_{135}	—	July 27, 2014	Haleakala	Pan-STARRS 1	·	1.8 km	MPC · JPL
861682	2014 OL_{136}	—	January 17, 2007	Kitt Peak	Spacewatch	·	1.6 km	MPC · JPL
861683	2014 OS_{136}	—	January 27, 2012	Mount Lemmon	Mount Lemmon Survey	·	2.0 km	MPC · JPL
861684	2014 OU_{139}	—	July 16, 2004	Cerro Tololo	Deep Ecliptic Survey	·	1.5 km	MPC · JPL
861685	2014 OL_{142}	—	September 22, 2009	Mount Lemmon	Mount Lemmon Survey	·	1.3 km	MPC · JPL
861686	2014 OH_{143}	—	July 27, 2014	Haleakala	Pan-STARRS 1	MAS	470 m	MPC · JPL
861687	2014 OK_{143}	—	July 27, 2014	Haleakala	Pan-STARRS 1	·	390 m	MPC · JPL
861688	2014 OU_{143}	—	January 26, 2012	Mount Lemmon	Mount Lemmon Survey	·	1.8 km	MPC · JPL
861689	2014 OX_{143}	—	July 28, 2009	Kitt Peak	Spacewatch	·	1.6 km	MPC · JPL
861690	2014 OR_{144}	—	November 18, 2006	Kitt Peak	Spacewatch	·	970 m	MPC · JPL
861691	2014 OG_{145}	—	June 27, 2014	Haleakala	Pan-STARRS 1	·	480 m	MPC · JPL
861692	2014 OR_{148}	—	January 13, 2013	Mount Lemmon	Mount Lemmon Survey	·	890 m	MPC · JPL
861693	2014 OZ_{148}	—	June 25, 2014	Mount Lemmon	Mount Lemmon Survey	·	1.8 km	MPC · JPL
861694	2014 OD_{150}	—	July 3, 2014	Haleakala	Pan-STARRS 1	·	820 m	MPC · JPL
861695	2014 OF_{150}	—	August 28, 2009	Kitt Peak	Spacewatch	·	1.4 km	MPC · JPL
861696	2014 OG_{150}	—	November 23, 2011	Mayhill-ISON	L. Elenin	·	560 m	MPC · JPL
861697	2014 OS_{152}	—	July 27, 2014	Haleakala	Pan-STARRS 1	·	1.9 km	MPC · JPL
861698	2014 OK_{154}	—	July 27, 2014	Haleakala	Pan-STARRS 1	·	1.3 km	MPC · JPL
861699	2014 OB_{155}	—	July 27, 2014	Haleakala	Pan-STARRS 1	·	1.4 km	MPC · JPL
861700	2014 OH_{157}	—	July 27, 2014	Haleakala	Pan-STARRS 1	·	2.3 km	MPC · JPL

== 861701–861800 ==
back to top

Designation			Discovery			Properties		Ref
Permanent	Provisional	Named after	Date	Site	Discoverer(s)	Category	Diam.	Ref
861701	2014 OX_{157}	—	July 27, 2014	Haleakala	Pan-STARRS 1	EOS	1.4 km	MPC · JPL
861702	2014 OY_{157}	—	July 27, 2014	Haleakala	Pan-STARRS 1	·	950 m	MPC · JPL
861703	2014 OZ_{159}	—	June 30, 2014	Haleakala	Pan-STARRS 1	·	1.4 km	MPC · JPL
861704	2014 OQ_{160}	—	October 24, 2011	Kitt Peak	Spacewatch	·	770 m	MPC · JPL
861705	2014 OO_{162}	—	January 5, 2013	Kitt Peak	Spacewatch	·	690 m	MPC · JPL
861706	2014 OS_{162}	—	June 30, 2014	Haleakala	Pan-STARRS 1	·	1.5 km	MPC · JPL
861707	2014 OK_{163}	—	July 27, 2014	Haleakala	Pan-STARRS 1	·	1.5 km	MPC · JPL
861708	2014 OZ_{163}	—	February 5, 2013	Mount Lemmon	Mount Lemmon Survey	V	400 m	MPC · JPL
861709	2014 OL_{167}	—	July 27, 2014	Haleakala	Pan-STARRS 1	·	470 m	MPC · JPL
861710	2014 OM_{170}	—	April 14, 2008	Mount Lemmon	Mount Lemmon Survey	·	1.3 km	MPC · JPL
861711	2014 OA_{172}	—	July 3, 2014	Haleakala	Pan-STARRS 1	·	460 m	MPC · JPL
861712	2014 OD_{175}	—	June 30, 2014	Haleakala	Pan-STARRS 1	·	1.4 km	MPC · JPL
861713	2014 OG_{175}	—	July 27, 2014	Haleakala	Pan-STARRS 1	·	2.0 km	MPC · JPL
861714	2014 OR_{177}	—	September 21, 2011	Kitt Peak	Spacewatch	·	520 m	MPC · JPL
861715	2014 OK_{178}	—	July 27, 2014	Haleakala	Pan-STARRS 1	·	1.4 km	MPC · JPL
861716	2014 OE_{180}	—	March 13, 2013	Haleakala	Pan-STARRS 1	·	2.0 km	MPC · JPL
861717	2014 OK_{180}	—	April 17, 2013	Haleakala	Pan-STARRS 1	·	1.9 km	MPC · JPL
861718	2014 OA_{181}	—	July 27, 2014	Haleakala	Pan-STARRS 1	·	750 m	MPC · JPL
861719	2014 OT_{182}	—	June 28, 2014	Haleakala	Pan-STARRS 1	·	1.5 km	MPC · JPL
861720	2014 OF_{183}	—	June 28, 2014	Haleakala	Pan-STARRS 1	·	550 m	MPC · JPL
861721	2014 OR_{184}	—	March 8, 2013	Haleakala	Pan-STARRS 1	·	1.7 km	MPC · JPL
861722	2014 OK_{185}	—	September 11, 2007	Mount Lemmon	Mount Lemmon Survey	·	640 m	MPC · JPL
861723	2014 OE_{186}	—	April 28, 2009	Mount Lemmon	Mount Lemmon Survey	·	1.2 km	MPC · JPL
861724	2014 OW_{188}	—	August 24, 2007	Kitt Peak	Spacewatch	·	520 m	MPC · JPL
861725	2014 OS_{192}	—	July 27, 2014	Haleakala	Pan-STARRS 1	MAS	510 m	MPC · JPL
861726	2014 OU_{193}	—	August 27, 2006	Kitt Peak	Spacewatch	T_{j} (2.98) · 3:2	4.2 km	MPC · JPL
861727	2014 OY_{193}	—	September 13, 2007	Kitt Peak	Spacewatch	·	800 m	MPC · JPL
861728	2014 OG_{197}	—	September 18, 2003	Kitt Peak	Spacewatch	MAS	490 m	MPC · JPL
861729	2014 ON_{198}	—	February 14, 2013	Haleakala	Pan-STARRS 1	H	380 m	MPC · JPL
861730	2014 OB_{201}	—	June 29, 2014	Haleakala	Pan-STARRS 1	·	550 m	MPC · JPL
861731	2014 OC_{201}	—	September 5, 2008	Kitt Peak	Spacewatch	·	470 m	MPC · JPL
861732	2014 OH_{201}	—	July 28, 2014	Haleakala	Pan-STARRS 1	·	1.8 km	MPC · JPL
861733	2014 OM_{201}	—	July 28, 2014	Haleakala	Pan-STARRS 1	AGN	760 m	MPC · JPL
861734	2014 OE_{202}	—	July 3, 2014	Haleakala	Pan-STARRS 1	·	510 m	MPC · JPL
861735	2014 OS_{202}	—	July 28, 2014	Haleakala	Pan-STARRS 1	·	1.3 km	MPC · JPL
861736	2014 OT_{204}	—	July 28, 2014	Haleakala	Pan-STARRS 1	EOS	1.2 km	MPC · JPL
861737	2014 OJ_{206}	—	July 8, 2014	Haleakala	Pan-STARRS 1	·	1.9 km	MPC · JPL
861738	2014 OO_{206}	—	July 3, 2014	Haleakala	Pan-STARRS 1	·	1.3 km	MPC · JPL
861739	2014 OX_{208}	—	July 25, 2014	Haleakala	Pan-STARRS 1	·	1 km	MPC · JPL
861740	2014 OP_{210}	—	April 27, 2006	Cerro Tololo	Deep Ecliptic Survey	·	610 m	MPC · JPL
861741	2014 OB_{211}	—	June 27, 2014	Haleakala	Pan-STARRS 1	·	880 m	MPC · JPL
861742	2014 OR_{211}	—	July 25, 2014	Haleakala	Pan-STARRS 1	·	800 m	MPC · JPL
861743	2014 OY_{212}	—	July 27, 2014	Haleakala	Pan-STARRS 1	MIS	1.5 km	MPC · JPL
861744	2014 OA_{215}	—	October 30, 2011	Mount Lemmon	Mount Lemmon Survey	·	600 m	MPC · JPL
861745	2014 OW_{215}	—	October 24, 2011	Haleakala	Pan-STARRS 1	·	770 m	MPC · JPL
861746	2014 OC_{216}	—	July 27, 2014	Haleakala	Pan-STARRS 1	NYS	650 m	MPC · JPL
861747	2014 OA_{217}	—	July 27, 2014	Haleakala	Pan-STARRS 1	·	1.4 km	MPC · JPL
861748	2014 OC_{219}	—	January 1, 2009	Mount Lemmon	Mount Lemmon Survey	V	410 m	MPC · JPL
861749	2014 OF_{219}	—	May 13, 2010	Kitt Peak	Spacewatch	·	730 m	MPC · JPL
861750	2014 OJ_{220}	—	September 12, 2007	Mount Lemmon	Mount Lemmon Survey	·	630 m	MPC · JPL
861751	2014 OW_{223}	—	July 3, 2014	Haleakala	Pan-STARRS 1	·	1.7 km	MPC · JPL
861752	2014 OU_{224}	—	June 29, 2014	Haleakala	Pan-STARRS 1	·	840 m	MPC · JPL
861753	2014 OB_{225}	—	November 30, 2008	Kitt Peak	Spacewatch	T_{j} (2.99) · 3:2	3.8 km	MPC · JPL
861754	2014 OP_{225}	—	October 19, 2007	Mount Lemmon	Mount Lemmon Survey	·	590 m	MPC · JPL
861755	2014 OB_{226}	—	September 13, 2007	Mount Lemmon	Mount Lemmon Survey	·	810 m	MPC · JPL
861756	2014 OQ_{226}	—	July 27, 2014	Haleakala	Pan-STARRS 1	·	730 m	MPC · JPL
861757	2014 OF_{227}	—	June 28, 2014	Haleakala	Pan-STARRS 1	·	1.5 km	MPC · JPL
861758	2014 OM_{229}	—	September 14, 2007	Mount Lemmon	Mount Lemmon Survey	·	590 m	MPC · JPL
861759	2014 OC_{230}	—	June 3, 2014	Haleakala	Pan-STARRS 1	·	1.3 km	MPC · JPL
861760	2014 OH_{231}	—	September 30, 2003	Kitt Peak	Spacewatch	MAS	520 m	MPC · JPL
861761	2014 OW_{231}	—	July 27, 2014	Haleakala	Pan-STARRS 1	·	460 m	MPC · JPL
861762	2014 OF_{232}	—	July 27, 2014	Haleakala	Pan-STARRS 1	·	910 m	MPC · JPL
861763	2014 OH_{233}	—	February 16, 2013	Mount Lemmon	Mount Lemmon Survey	·	950 m	MPC · JPL
861764	2014 OF_{234}	—	January 31, 2006	Kitt Peak	Spacewatch	·	470 m	MPC · JPL
861765	2014 OT_{236}	—	May 10, 2014	Haleakala	Pan-STARRS 1	·	2.2 km	MPC · JPL
861766	2014 OU_{237}	—	September 4, 2011	Haleakala	Pan-STARRS 1	·	550 m	MPC · JPL
861767	2014 OW_{238}	—	July 29, 2014	Haleakala	Pan-STARRS 1	·	1.2 km	MPC · JPL
861768	2014 OU_{239}	—	July 27, 2014	Haleakala	Pan-STARRS 1	·	1.7 km	MPC · JPL
861769	2014 OW_{239}	—	February 12, 2008	Kitt Peak	Spacewatch	·	1.7 km	MPC · JPL
861770	2014 OC_{240}	—	November 17, 2006	Mount Lemmon	Mount Lemmon Survey	·	1.0 km	MPC · JPL
861771	2014 OL_{240}	—	June 27, 2014	Haleakala	Pan-STARRS 1	·	690 m	MPC · JPL
861772	2014 OZ_{240}	—	July 29, 2014	Haleakala	Pan-STARRS 1	3:2	3.8 km	MPC · JPL
861773	2014 OK_{246}	—	August 16, 2009	Kitt Peak	Spacewatch	·	1.5 km	MPC · JPL
861774	2014 OV_{246}	—	July 27, 2014	Haleakala	Pan-STARRS 1	·	2.2 km	MPC · JPL
861775	2014 OP_{248}	—	July 29, 2014	Haleakala	Pan-STARRS 1	·	1.4 km	MPC · JPL
861776	2014 OK_{249}	—	July 29, 2014	Haleakala	Pan-STARRS 1	·	1.3 km	MPC · JPL
861777	2014 OO_{250}	—	July 29, 2014	Haleakala	Pan-STARRS 1	·	1.4 km	MPC · JPL
861778	2014 OV_{250}	—	October 11, 2004	Kitt Peak	Spacewatch	V	450 m	MPC · JPL
861779	2014 ON_{251}	—	June 29, 2014	Haleakala	Pan-STARRS 1	·	1.3 km	MPC · JPL
861780	2014 OT_{252}	—	June 27, 2014	Haleakala	Pan-STARRS 1	·	490 m	MPC · JPL
861781	2014 OD_{253}	—	July 29, 2014	Haleakala	Pan-STARRS 1	·	790 m	MPC · JPL
861782	2014 OS_{253}	—	June 29, 2014	Haleakala	Pan-STARRS 1	·	1.5 km	MPC · JPL
861783	2014 OO_{255}	—	July 29, 2014	Haleakala	Pan-STARRS 1	EOS	1.4 km	MPC · JPL
861784	2014 OG_{256}	—	June 25, 2014	Mount Lemmon	Mount Lemmon Survey	EOS	1.3 km	MPC · JPL
861785	2014 OZ_{256}	—	July 29, 2014	Haleakala	Pan-STARRS 1	EOS	1.3 km	MPC · JPL
861786	2014 ON_{260}	—	June 29, 2014	Haleakala	Pan-STARRS 1	·	2.0 km	MPC · JPL
861787	2014 OA_{261}	—	June 29, 2014	Haleakala	Pan-STARRS 1	·	570 m	MPC · JPL
861788	2014 OU_{263}	—	July 29, 2014	Haleakala	Pan-STARRS 1	EUN	740 m	MPC · JPL
861789	2014 OH_{265}	—	July 29, 2014	Haleakala	Pan-STARRS 1	·	1.5 km	MPC · JPL
861790	2014 OU_{266}	—	July 29, 2014	Haleakala	Pan-STARRS 1	·	610 m	MPC · JPL
861791	2014 OB_{267}	—	July 29, 2014	Haleakala	Pan-STARRS 1	·	810 m	MPC · JPL
861792	2014 OM_{267}	—	July 29, 2014	Haleakala	Pan-STARRS 1	·	2.2 km	MPC · JPL
861793	2014 OV_{267}	—	January 13, 2011	Mount Lemmon	Mount Lemmon Survey	·	1.8 km	MPC · JPL
861794	2014 OB_{270}	—	November 24, 2011	Haleakala	Pan-STARRS 1	·	740 m	MPC · JPL
861795	2014 OJ_{270}	—	July 29, 2014	Haleakala	Pan-STARRS 1	EOS	1.3 km	MPC · JPL
861796	2014 OX_{272}	—	July 29, 2014	Haleakala	Pan-STARRS 1	EOS	1.4 km	MPC · JPL
861797	2014 OR_{273}	—	July 11, 2010	WISE	WISE	·	2.1 km	MPC · JPL
861798	2014 OT_{273}	—	June 29, 2014	Haleakala	Pan-STARRS 1	·	1.9 km	MPC · JPL
861799	2014 OM_{275}	—	July 29, 2014	Haleakala	Pan-STARRS 1	·	2.0 km	MPC · JPL
861800	2014 OC_{276}	—	January 14, 2012	Mount Lemmon	Mount Lemmon Survey	·	1.0 km	MPC · JPL

== 861801–861900 ==
back to top

Designation			Discovery			Properties		Ref
Permanent	Provisional	Named after	Date	Site	Discoverer(s)	Category	Diam.	Ref
861801	2014 OS_{276}	—	July 8, 2014	Haleakala	Pan-STARRS 1	·	1.1 km	MPC · JPL
861802	2014 OR_{277}	—	March 12, 2013	Kitt Peak	Spacewatch	·	830 m	MPC · JPL
861803	2014 OL_{279}	—	June 5, 2014	Haleakala	Pan-STARRS 1	·	590 m	MPC · JPL
861804	2014 ON_{279}	—	July 8, 2014	Haleakala	Pan-STARRS 1	·	820 m	MPC · JPL
861805	2014 OB_{280}	—	July 29, 2014	Haleakala	Pan-STARRS 1	·	2.1 km	MPC · JPL
861806	2014 OR_{281}	—	July 29, 2014	Haleakala	Pan-STARRS 1	·	830 m	MPC · JPL
861807	2014 OK_{284}	—	November 6, 2010	Mount Lemmon	Mount Lemmon Survey	·	1.3 km	MPC · JPL
861808	2014 ON_{285}	—	July 29, 2014	Haleakala	Pan-STARRS 1	·	1.4 km	MPC · JPL
861809	2014 OW_{286}	—	June 28, 2014	Haleakala	Pan-STARRS 1	·	1.9 km	MPC · JPL
861810	2014 OZ_{286}	—	June 26, 2014	Haleakala	Pan-STARRS 1	EUN	910 m	MPC · JPL
861811	2014 OG_{287}	—	July 8, 2014	Haleakala	Pan-STARRS 1	EOS	1.2 km	MPC · JPL
861812	2014 OD_{288}	—	August 16, 2009	Kitt Peak	Spacewatch	·	1.7 km	MPC · JPL
861813	2014 OF_{290}	—	July 8, 2014	Haleakala	Pan-STARRS 1	·	620 m	MPC · JPL
861814	2014 OL_{290}	—	July 8, 2014	Haleakala	Pan-STARRS 1	·	580 m	MPC · JPL
861815	2014 OP_{292}	—	July 29, 2014	Haleakala	Pan-STARRS 1	·	780 m	MPC · JPL
861816	2014 OA_{293}	—	July 29, 2014	Haleakala	Pan-STARRS 1	·	1.2 km	MPC · JPL
861817	2014 OJ_{294}	—	May 20, 2005	Palomar	NEAT	·	1.2 km	MPC · JPL
861818	2014 OS_{296}	—	July 29, 2014	Haleakala	Pan-STARRS 1	NYS	800 m	MPC · JPL
861819	2014 OR_{298}	—	October 12, 2007	Kitt Peak	Spacewatch	·	820 m	MPC · JPL
861820	2014 OA_{299}	—	July 29, 2014	Haleakala	Pan-STARRS 1	·	770 m	MPC · JPL
861821	2014 OC_{299}	—	July 29, 2014	Haleakala	Pan-STARRS 1	V	450 m	MPC · JPL
861822	2014 OE_{299}	—	July 29, 2014	Haleakala	Pan-STARRS 1	·	1.8 km	MPC · JPL
861823	2014 OT_{301}	—	July 4, 2014	Haleakala	Pan-STARRS 1	·	1.3 km	MPC · JPL
861824	2014 OX_{301}	—	January 19, 2012	Haleakala	Pan-STARRS 1	EOS	1.3 km	MPC · JPL
861825	2014 OS_{306}	—	July 25, 2014	Haleakala	Pan-STARRS 1	·	670 m	MPC · JPL
861826	2014 OC_{307}	—	July 26, 2014	Haleakala	Pan-STARRS 1	·	1.1 km	MPC · JPL
861827	2014 OV_{310}	—	July 27, 2014	Haleakala	Pan-STARRS 1	·	690 m	MPC · JPL
861828	2014 OF_{311}	—	July 25, 2014	Haleakala	Pan-STARRS 1	EOS	1.2 km	MPC · JPL
861829	2014 OV_{311}	—	July 27, 2014	Haleakala	Pan-STARRS 1	EOS	1.2 km	MPC · JPL
861830	2014 OL_{317}	—	July 28, 2014	Haleakala	Pan-STARRS 1	·	760 m	MPC · JPL
861831	2014 OO_{318}	—	September 30, 2005	Mauna Kea	A. Boattini	·	900 m	MPC · JPL
861832	2014 OV_{318}	—	February 3, 2012	Haleakala	Pan-STARRS 1	·	1.3 km	MPC · JPL
861833	2014 OR_{319}	—	July 4, 2014	Haleakala	Pan-STARRS 1	·	1.8 km	MPC · JPL
861834	2014 OS_{319}	—	December 27, 2011	Mount Lemmon	Mount Lemmon Survey	·	640 m	MPC · JPL
861835	2014 OP_{322}	—	July 29, 2014	Haleakala	Pan-STARRS 1	EMA	1.8 km	MPC · JPL
861836	2014 OC_{323}	—	July 25, 2014	Haleakala	Pan-STARRS 1	·	680 m	MPC · JPL
861837	2014 OR_{326}	—	July 25, 2014	Haleakala	Pan-STARRS 1	·	1.1 km	MPC · JPL
861838	2014 OB_{328}	—	August 10, 2007	Kitt Peak	Spacewatch	·	610 m	MPC · JPL
861839	2014 OP_{328}	—	March 15, 2008	Mount Lemmon	Mount Lemmon Survey	·	1.1 km	MPC · JPL
861840	2014 OO_{329}	—	July 3, 2014	Haleakala	Pan-STARRS 1	·	1.5 km	MPC · JPL
861841	2014 OZ_{331}	—	March 19, 2013	Haleakala	Pan-STARRS 1	·	540 m	MPC · JPL
861842	2014 OX_{332}	—	June 30, 2014	Haleakala	Pan-STARRS 1	·	1.3 km	MPC · JPL
861843	2014 OO_{333}	—	July 8, 2014	Haleakala	Pan-STARRS 1	·	1.3 km	MPC · JPL
861844	2014 OV_{333}	—	June 28, 2014	Haleakala	Pan-STARRS 1	·	590 m	MPC · JPL
861845	2014 OF_{336}	—	July 30, 2014	Haleakala	Pan-STARRS 1	·	1.9 km	MPC · JPL
861846	2014 OX_{337}	—	July 25, 2014	Haleakala	Pan-STARRS 1	MAS	440 m	MPC · JPL
861847	2014 OY_{338}	—	January 8, 2013	Haleakala	Pan-STARRS 1	H	380 m	MPC · JPL
861848	2014 OQ_{339}	—	June 27, 2014	Haleakala	Pan-STARRS 1	·	1.4 km	MPC · JPL
861849	2014 OS_{340}	—	July 25, 2014	Haleakala	Pan-STARRS 1	·	2.2 km	MPC · JPL
861850	2014 OY_{340}	—	July 28, 2014	Haleakala	Pan-STARRS 1	·	1.9 km	MPC · JPL
861851	2014 OD_{341}	—	June 24, 2014	Mount Lemmon	Mount Lemmon Survey	·	560 m	MPC · JPL
861852	2014 OL_{341}	—	July 28, 2014	Haleakala	Pan-STARRS 1	·	1.1 km	MPC · JPL
861853	2014 OY_{344}	—	July 4, 2014	Haleakala	Pan-STARRS 1	·	1.2 km	MPC · JPL
861854	2014 OK_{348}	—	July 28, 2014	Haleakala	Pan-STARRS 1	EOS	1.2 km	MPC · JPL
861855	2014 OS_{348}	—	July 26, 2014	Haleakala	Pan-STARRS 1	·	1.3 km	MPC · JPL
861856	2014 OA_{350}	—	October 12, 2007	Kitt Peak	Spacewatch	·	750 m	MPC · JPL
861857	2014 OQ_{350}	—	July 28, 2014	Haleakala	Pan-STARRS 1	·	570 m	MPC · JPL
861858	2014 OO_{351}	—	July 28, 2014	Haleakala	Pan-STARRS 1	EOS	1.4 km	MPC · JPL
861859	2014 OC_{354}	—	July 28, 2014	Haleakala	Pan-STARRS 1	·	1.6 km	MPC · JPL
861860	2014 OR_{354}	—	July 28, 2014	Haleakala	Pan-STARRS 1	·	1.3 km	MPC · JPL
861861	2014 OY_{354}	—	July 28, 2014	Haleakala	Pan-STARRS 1	·	940 m	MPC · JPL
861862	2014 OO_{357}	—	September 19, 2007	Kitt Peak	Spacewatch	·	520 m	MPC · JPL
861863	2014 OR_{358}	—	July 28, 2014	Haleakala	Pan-STARRS 1	·	420 m	MPC · JPL
861864	2014 OL_{360}	—	July 28, 2014	Haleakala	Pan-STARRS 1	·	870 m	MPC · JPL
861865	2014 OS_{360}	—	July 28, 2014	Haleakala	Pan-STARRS 1	·	1.2 km	MPC · JPL
861866	2014 OS_{361}	—	July 25, 2014	Haleakala	Pan-STARRS 1	·	1.3 km	MPC · JPL
861867	2014 OJ_{363}	—	July 27, 2014	Haleakala	Pan-STARRS 1	·	1.5 km	MPC · JPL
861868	2014 OE_{364}	—	February 16, 2013	Mount Lemmon	Mount Lemmon Survey	·	480 m	MPC · JPL
861869	2014 OJ_{365}	—	December 19, 2004	Mount Lemmon	Mount Lemmon Survey	·	2.1 km	MPC · JPL
861870	2014 OG_{368}	—	October 13, 2010	Kitt Peak	Spacewatch	·	1.2 km	MPC · JPL
861871	2014 OS_{368}	—	February 9, 2013	Haleakala	Pan-STARRS 1	·	720 m	MPC · JPL
861872	2014 OG_{372}	—	July 25, 2014	Haleakala	Pan-STARRS 1	·	1.8 km	MPC · JPL
861873	2014 ON_{372}	—	August 10, 2007	Kitt Peak	Spacewatch	·	730 m	MPC · JPL
861874	2014 OU_{372}	—	July 25, 2014	ESA OGS	ESA OGS	·	1.7 km	MPC · JPL
861875	2014 OX_{372}	—	August 10, 2007	Kitt Peak	Spacewatch	·	550 m	MPC · JPL
861876	2014 OA_{373}	—	October 10, 2004	Kitt Peak	Spacewatch	·	530 m	MPC · JPL
861877	2014 OJ_{373}	—	June 29, 2014	Haleakala	Pan-STARRS 1	·	540 m	MPC · JPL
861878	2014 OU_{374}	—	October 22, 2011	Mount Lemmon	Mount Lemmon Survey	·	420 m	MPC · JPL
861879	2014 OD_{376}	—	July 25, 2014	Haleakala	Pan-STARRS 1	·	2.2 km	MPC · JPL
861880	2014 OV_{376}	—	June 29, 2014	Haleakala	Pan-STARRS 1	NYS	720 m	MPC · JPL
861881	2014 OJ_{382}	—	August 1, 2009	Kitt Peak	Spacewatch	·	1.5 km	MPC · JPL
861882	2014 OL_{382}	—	July 27, 2014	Haleakala	Pan-STARRS 1	·	700 m	MPC · JPL
861883	2014 OH_{383}	—	June 29, 2014	Haleakala	Pan-STARRS 1	·	1.9 km	MPC · JPL
861884	2014 OD_{385}	—	September 8, 2004	Socorro	LINEAR	·	1.2 km	MPC · JPL
861885	2014 ON_{385}	—	June 23, 2014	Kitt Peak	Spacewatch	·	1.1 km	MPC · JPL
861886	2014 OX_{385}	—	July 4, 2014	Haleakala	Pan-STARRS 1	EOS	1.7 km	MPC · JPL
861887	2014 OE_{387}	—	May 22, 2003	Kitt Peak	Spacewatch	·	670 m	MPC · JPL
861888	2014 OY_{387}	—	June 29, 2014	Haleakala	Pan-STARRS 1	·	1.7 km	MPC · JPL
861889	2014 OL_{392}	—	July 29, 2014	Haleakala	Pan-STARRS 1	H	380 m	MPC · JPL
861890	2014 OF_{394}	—	July 28, 2014	Haleakala	Pan-STARRS 1	cubewano (hot)	294 km	MPC · JPL
861891	2014 OB_{395}	—	July 31, 2014	Haleakala	Pan-STARRS 1	H	350 m	MPC · JPL
861892	2014 OJ_{395}	—	July 25, 2014	Haleakala	Pan-STARRS 1	H	310 m	MPC · JPL
861893	2014 OK_{395}	—	July 31, 2014	Haleakala	Pan-STARRS 1	·	300 m	MPC · JPL
861894	2014 OY_{395}	—	July 25, 2014	Haleakala	Pan-STARRS 1	·	1.6 km	MPC · JPL
861895	2014 OJ_{396}	—	July 25, 2014	Haleakala	Pan-STARRS 1	·	1.5 km	MPC · JPL
861896	2014 OO_{398}	—	July 31, 2014	Haleakala	Pan-STARRS 1	LIX	2.2 km	MPC · JPL
861897	2014 OS_{399}	—	January 25, 2006	Kitt Peak	Spacewatch	·	1.7 km	MPC · JPL
861898	2014 OV_{402}	—	July 28, 2014	Haleakala	Pan-STARRS 1	V	410 m	MPC · JPL
861899	2014 OA_{403}	—	July 28, 2014	Haleakala	Pan-STARRS 1	·	1.7 km	MPC · JPL
861900	2014 OL_{404}	—	July 28, 2014	Haleakala	Pan-STARRS 1	·	830 m	MPC · JPL

== 861901–862000 ==
back to top

Designation			Discovery			Properties		Ref
Permanent	Provisional	Named after	Date	Site	Discoverer(s)	Category	Diam.	Ref
861901	2014 OP_{404}	—	July 29, 2014	Haleakala	Pan-STARRS 1	V	520 m	MPC · JPL
861902	2014 OA_{406}	—	July 25, 2014	Haleakala	Pan-STARRS 1	EOS	1.3 km	MPC · JPL
861903	2014 OB_{406}	—	July 25, 2014	Haleakala	Pan-STARRS 1	·	2.0 km	MPC · JPL
861904	2014 OO_{406}	—	July 25, 2014	Haleakala	Pan-STARRS 1	(1298)	2.1 km	MPC · JPL
861905	2014 OT_{406}	—	July 25, 2014	Haleakala	Pan-STARRS 1	·	660 m	MPC · JPL
861906	2014 OG_{407}	—	September 25, 2009	Kitt Peak	Spacewatch	THM	1.2 km	MPC · JPL
861907	2014 OU_{407}	—	September 26, 2009	Kitt Peak	Spacewatch	HYG	2.0 km	MPC · JPL
861908	2014 OX_{407}	—	July 25, 2014	Haleakala	Pan-STARRS 1	·	780 m	MPC · JPL
861909	2014 OY_{407}	—	September 18, 2009	Mount Lemmon	Mount Lemmon Survey	·	2.0 km	MPC · JPL
861910	2014 OO_{408}	—	March 28, 2012	Mount Lemmon	Mount Lemmon Survey	·	2.1 km	MPC · JPL
861911	2014 OG_{409}	—	January 19, 2012	Haleakala	Pan-STARRS 1	MAR	740 m	MPC · JPL
861912	2014 OW_{409}	—	July 25, 2014	Haleakala	Pan-STARRS 1	·	1.3 km	MPC · JPL
861913	2014 OX_{409}	—	July 25, 2014	Haleakala	Pan-STARRS 1	URS	2.3 km	MPC · JPL
861914	2014 OZ_{409}	—	July 25, 2014	Haleakala	Pan-STARRS 1	·	2.0 km	MPC · JPL
861915	2014 OK_{410}	—	July 27, 2014	Haleakala	Pan-STARRS 1	THM	1.6 km	MPC · JPL
861916	2014 ON_{410}	—	September 15, 2009	Kitt Peak	Spacewatch	·	1.1 km	MPC · JPL
861917	2014 OQ_{411}	—	July 28, 2014	Haleakala	Pan-STARRS 1	AGN	780 m	MPC · JPL
861918	2014 OC_{412}	—	July 28, 2014	Haleakala	Pan-STARRS 1	·	1.3 km	MPC · JPL
861919	2014 OV_{412}	—	August 27, 2009	Kitt Peak	Spacewatch	EOS	1.3 km	MPC · JPL
861920	2014 OY_{412}	—	July 29, 2014	Haleakala	Pan-STARRS 1	EOS	1.3 km	MPC · JPL
861921	2014 OS_{414}	—	July 31, 2014	Haleakala	Pan-STARRS 1	·	1.2 km	MPC · JPL
861922	2014 OS_{416}	—	July 31, 2014	Haleakala	Pan-STARRS 1	V	460 m	MPC · JPL
861923	2014 OW_{416}	—	November 26, 2005	Mount Lemmon	Mount Lemmon Survey	·	2.5 km	MPC · JPL
861924	2014 OZ_{416}	—	July 29, 2014	Haleakala	Pan-STARRS 1	·	2.4 km	MPC · JPL
861925	2014 OJ_{417}	—	July 31, 2014	Haleakala	Pan-STARRS 1	·	710 m	MPC · JPL
861926	2014 ON_{417}	—	July 30, 2014	Haleakala	Pan-STARRS 1	·	600 m	MPC · JPL
861927	2014 OB_{418}	—	July 25, 2014	Haleakala	Pan-STARRS 1	·	710 m	MPC · JPL
861928	2014 OM_{418}	—	July 25, 2014	Haleakala	Pan-STARRS 1	·	1.4 km	MPC · JPL
861929	2014 OO_{418}	—	July 30, 2014	Kitt Peak	Spacewatch	·	740 m	MPC · JPL
861930	2014 OP_{418}	—	July 28, 2014	Haleakala	Pan-STARRS 1	EOS	1.3 km	MPC · JPL
861931	2014 OT_{418}	—	July 25, 2014	Haleakala	Pan-STARRS 1	·	2.2 km	MPC · JPL
861932	2014 OY_{418}	—	July 30, 2014	Haleakala	Pan-STARRS 1	H	260 m	MPC · JPL
861933	2014 OV_{421}	—	July 28, 2014	Haleakala	Pan-STARRS 1	·	770 m	MPC · JPL
861934	2014 OX_{421}	—	July 31, 2014	Haleakala	Pan-STARRS 1	·	1.7 km	MPC · JPL
861935	2014 OJ_{422}	—	July 29, 2014	Haleakala	Pan-STARRS 1	·	2.0 km	MPC · JPL
861936	2014 OM_{422}	—	September 9, 2007	Kitt Peak	Spacewatch	·	540 m	MPC · JPL
861937	2014 OO_{422}	—	July 25, 2014	Haleakala	Pan-STARRS 1	·	670 m	MPC · JPL
861938	2014 OS_{422}	—	July 31, 2014	Haleakala	Pan-STARRS 1	RAF	700 m	MPC · JPL
861939	2014 OD_{423}	—	July 30, 2014	Haleakala	Pan-STARRS 1	·	2.1 km	MPC · JPL
861940	2014 OG_{423}	—	July 28, 2014	Haleakala	Pan-STARRS 1	·	820 m	MPC · JPL
861941	2014 OA_{426}	—	July 25, 2014	Haleakala	Pan-STARRS 1	·	1.7 km	MPC · JPL
861942	2014 OL_{428}	—	July 31, 2014	Haleakala	Pan-STARRS 1	·	1.9 km	MPC · JPL
861943	2014 OA_{429}	—	July 25, 2014	Haleakala	Pan-STARRS 1	·	1.5 km	MPC · JPL
861944	2014 OD_{429}	—	July 28, 2014	Haleakala	Pan-STARRS 1	PHO	880 m	MPC · JPL
861945	2014 OX_{430}	—	July 28, 2014	Haleakala	Pan-STARRS 1	·	1.4 km	MPC · JPL
861946	2014 OF_{431}	—	July 25, 2014	Haleakala	Pan-STARRS 1	·	900 m	MPC · JPL
861947	2014 OM_{431}	—	July 28, 2014	Haleakala	Pan-STARRS 1	·	2.1 km	MPC · JPL
861948	2014 OQ_{431}	—	July 25, 2014	Haleakala	Pan-STARRS 1	·	1.7 km	MPC · JPL
861949	2014 OT_{431}	—	August 27, 2009	Kitt Peak	Spacewatch	·	1.3 km	MPC · JPL
861950	2014 OH_{433}	—	July 25, 2014	Haleakala	Pan-STARRS 1	·	1.9 km	MPC · JPL
861951	2014 OQ_{433}	—	July 25, 2014	Haleakala	Pan-STARRS 1	VER	1.9 km	MPC · JPL
861952	2014 OX_{433}	—	July 28, 2014	Haleakala	Pan-STARRS 1	·	1.7 km	MPC · JPL
861953	2014 OY_{433}	—	July 31, 2014	Haleakala	Pan-STARRS 1	V	430 m	MPC · JPL
861954	2014 OZ_{433}	—	July 25, 2014	Haleakala	Pan-STARRS 1	·	2.0 km	MPC · JPL
861955	2014 OA_{434}	—	July 25, 2014	Haleakala	Pan-STARRS 1	KOR	980 m	MPC · JPL
861956	2014 OO_{434}	—	July 28, 2014	Haleakala	Pan-STARRS 1	MAS	590 m	MPC · JPL
861957	2014 OQ_{434}	—	July 25, 2014	Haleakala	Pan-STARRS 1	MAS	530 m	MPC · JPL
861958	2014 OR_{434}	—	July 31, 2014	Haleakala	Pan-STARRS 1	·	880 m	MPC · JPL
861959	2014 OU_{434}	—	July 28, 2014	Haleakala	Pan-STARRS 1	·	650 m	MPC · JPL
861960	2014 OS_{435}	—	July 29, 2014	Haleakala	Pan-STARRS 1	·	850 m	MPC · JPL
861961	2014 OV_{435}	—	July 25, 2014	Haleakala	Pan-STARRS 1	·	810 m	MPC · JPL
861962	2014 OA_{436}	—	July 30, 2014	Haleakala	Pan-STARRS 1	·	840 m	MPC · JPL
861963	2014 OG_{436}	—	July 30, 2014	Kitt Peak	Spacewatch	·	950 m	MPC · JPL
861964	2014 OE_{437}	—	July 30, 2014	Haleakala	Pan-STARRS 1	(2076)	550 m	MPC · JPL
861965	2014 OM_{437}	—	July 25, 2014	Haleakala	Pan-STARRS 1	EOS	1.1 km	MPC · JPL
861966	2014 OQ_{437}	—	July 25, 2014	Haleakala	Pan-STARRS 1	·	2.1 km	MPC · JPL
861967	2014 OS_{437}	—	July 25, 2014	Haleakala	Pan-STARRS 1	EOS	1.3 km	MPC · JPL
861968	2014 OP_{439}	—	July 26, 2014	Haleakala	Pan-STARRS 1	·	1.9 km	MPC · JPL
861969 Elliottsmith	2014 OS_{439}	Elliottsmith	July 31, 2014	Haleakala	Pan-STARRS 1	EOS	1.1 km	MPC · JPL
861970	2014 OU_{439}	—	July 28, 2014	Haleakala	Pan-STARRS 1	EOS	1.4 km	MPC · JPL
861971	2014 OQ_{440}	—	July 29, 2014	Haleakala	Pan-STARRS 1	EOS	1.2 km	MPC · JPL
861972	2014 OV_{440}	—	July 28, 2014	Haleakala	Pan-STARRS 1	·	1.8 km	MPC · JPL
861973	2014 OB_{441}	—	July 30, 2014	Haleakala	Pan-STARRS 1	·	590 m	MPC · JPL
861974	2014 OD_{441}	—	July 29, 2014	Roque de los Muchachos	EURONEAR	·	2.8 km	MPC · JPL
861975	2014 OJ_{441}	—	July 30, 2014	Haleakala	Pan-STARRS 1	·	1.7 km	MPC · JPL
861976	2014 OT_{441}	—	July 31, 2014	Haleakala	Pan-STARRS 1	EOS	1.3 km	MPC · JPL
861977	2014 OU_{441}	—	July 29, 2014	Roque de los Muchachos	EURONEAR	·	1.8 km	MPC · JPL
861978	2014 OZ_{441}	—	July 25, 2014	Haleakala	Pan-STARRS 1	·	1.7 km	MPC · JPL
861979	2014 OA_{442}	—	July 25, 2014	Haleakala	Pan-STARRS 1	EOS	1.2 km	MPC · JPL
861980	2014 OE_{442}	—	July 29, 2014	Haleakala	Pan-STARRS 1	EOS	1.3 km	MPC · JPL
861981	2014 OQ_{442}	—	July 25, 2014	Haleakala	Pan-STARRS 1	·	1.3 km	MPC · JPL
861982	2014 OW_{442}	—	July 25, 2014	Haleakala	Pan-STARRS 1	·	1.8 km	MPC · JPL
861983	2014 OX_{442}	—	July 28, 2014	Haleakala	Pan-STARRS 1	·	1.6 km	MPC · JPL
861984	2014 OY_{442}	—	July 30, 2014	Haleakala	Pan-STARRS 1	EOS	1.2 km	MPC · JPL
861985	2014 OH_{443}	—	July 25, 2014	Haleakala	Pan-STARRS 1	EOS	1.2 km	MPC · JPL
861986	2014 OM_{443}	—	July 31, 2014	Haleakala	Pan-STARRS 1	·	1.5 km	MPC · JPL
861987	2014 OE_{445}	—	July 30, 2014	Haleakala	Pan-STARRS 1	·	1.7 km	MPC · JPL
861988	2014 OY_{445}	—	July 27, 2014	Haleakala	Pan-STARRS 1	·	760 m	MPC · JPL
861989	2014 OJ_{447}	—	July 29, 2014	Haleakala	Pan-STARRS 1	·	1.8 km	MPC · JPL
861990	2014 OW_{447}	—	July 25, 2014	Haleakala	Pan-STARRS 1	MAS	530 m	MPC · JPL
861991	2014 OP_{450}	—	September 22, 2011	Kitt Peak	Spacewatch	·	470 m	MPC · JPL
861992	2014 OM_{451}	—	July 31, 2014	Haleakala	Pan-STARRS 1	·	2.0 km	MPC · JPL
861993	2014 OY_{451}	—	July 25, 2014	Haleakala	Pan-STARRS 1	V	400 m	MPC · JPL
861994	2014 OM_{452}	—	July 25, 2014	Haleakala	Pan-STARRS 1	·	960 m	MPC · JPL
861995	2014 OY_{452}	—	July 30, 2014	Kitt Peak	Spacewatch	·	910 m	MPC · JPL
861996	2014 OH_{453}	—	July 28, 2014	Haleakala	Pan-STARRS 1	·	1.1 km	MPC · JPL
861997	2014 OB_{455}	—	July 31, 2014	Haleakala	Pan-STARRS 1	·	2.0 km	MPC · JPL
861998	2014 ON_{455}	—	July 28, 2014	Haleakala	Pan-STARRS 1	·	2.1 km	MPC · JPL
861999	2014 OQ_{457}	—	July 28, 2014	Haleakala	Pan-STARRS 1	·	1.3 km	MPC · JPL
862000	2014 OB_{459}	—	July 28, 2014	Haleakala	Pan-STARRS 1	V	430 m	MPC · JPL

== Meaning of names ==
As minor planet discoveries are confirmed, they are given a permanent number by the IAU's Minor Planet Center (MPC), and the discoverers can then submit names for them, following the IAU's naming conventions. The list below concerns those minor planets in the specified number-range that have received names, and explains the meanings of those names.

Official naming citations of newly named small Solar System bodies are approved and published in a bulletin by IAU's Working Group for Small Bodies Nomenclature (WGSBN). Before May 2021, citations were published in MPC's Minor Planet Circulars for many decades. Recent citations can also be found on the JPL Small-Body Database (SBDB). Until his death in 2016, German astronomer Lutz D. Schmadel compiled these citations into the Dictionary of Minor Planet Names (DMP) and regularly updated the collection.

Based on Paul Herget's The Names of the Minor Planets, Schmadel also researched the unclear origin of numerous asteroids, most of which had been named prior to World War II. This article incorporates text from this source, which is in the public domain: SBDB New namings may only be added to this list below after official publication as the preannouncement of names is condemned. The WGSBN publishes a comprehensive guideline for the naming rules of non-cometary small Solar System bodies.

Named minor planet	Provisional	This minor planet was named for...	Ref · Catalog
861969 Elliottsmith	2014 OS_{439}	Elliott Smith, born Steven Paul Smith on August 6, 1969; American musician and songwriter.	IAU · 861969

back to top
