= Festál =

Series of ethnic festivals at Seattle Center

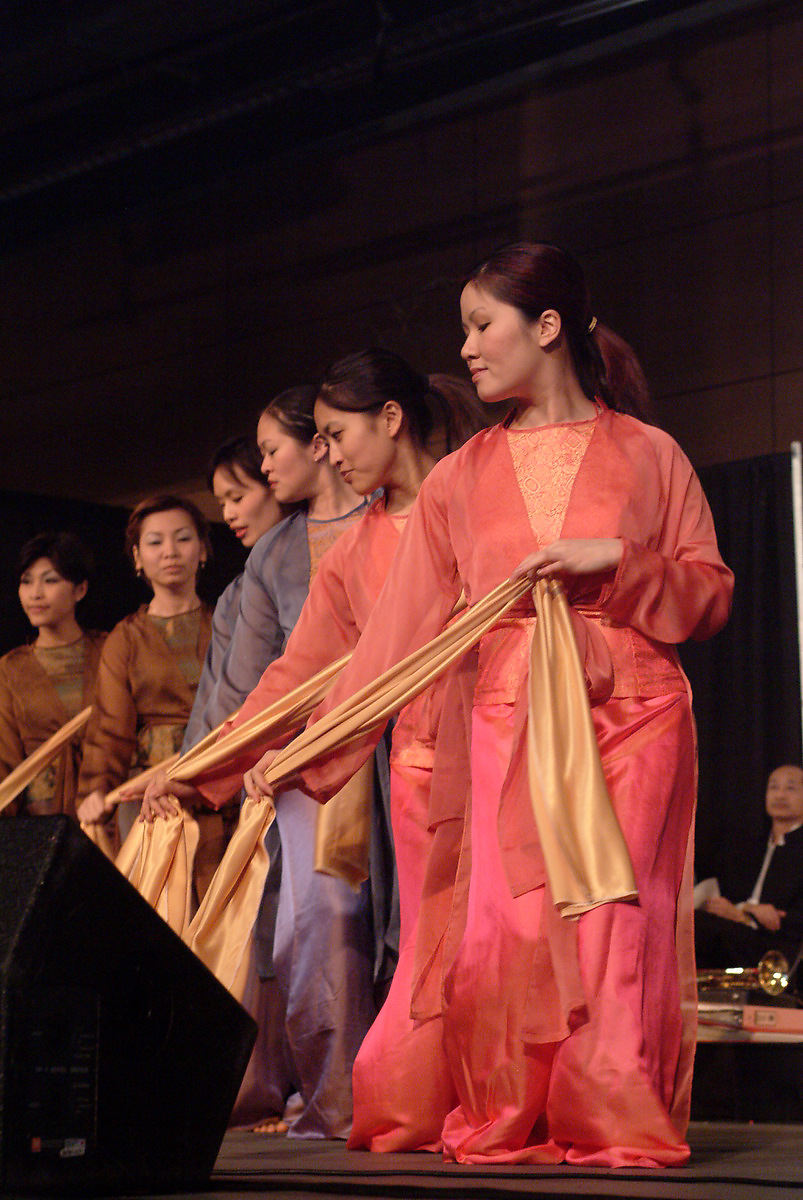
Dancers at Festál Vietnamese Tet Festival (2003)

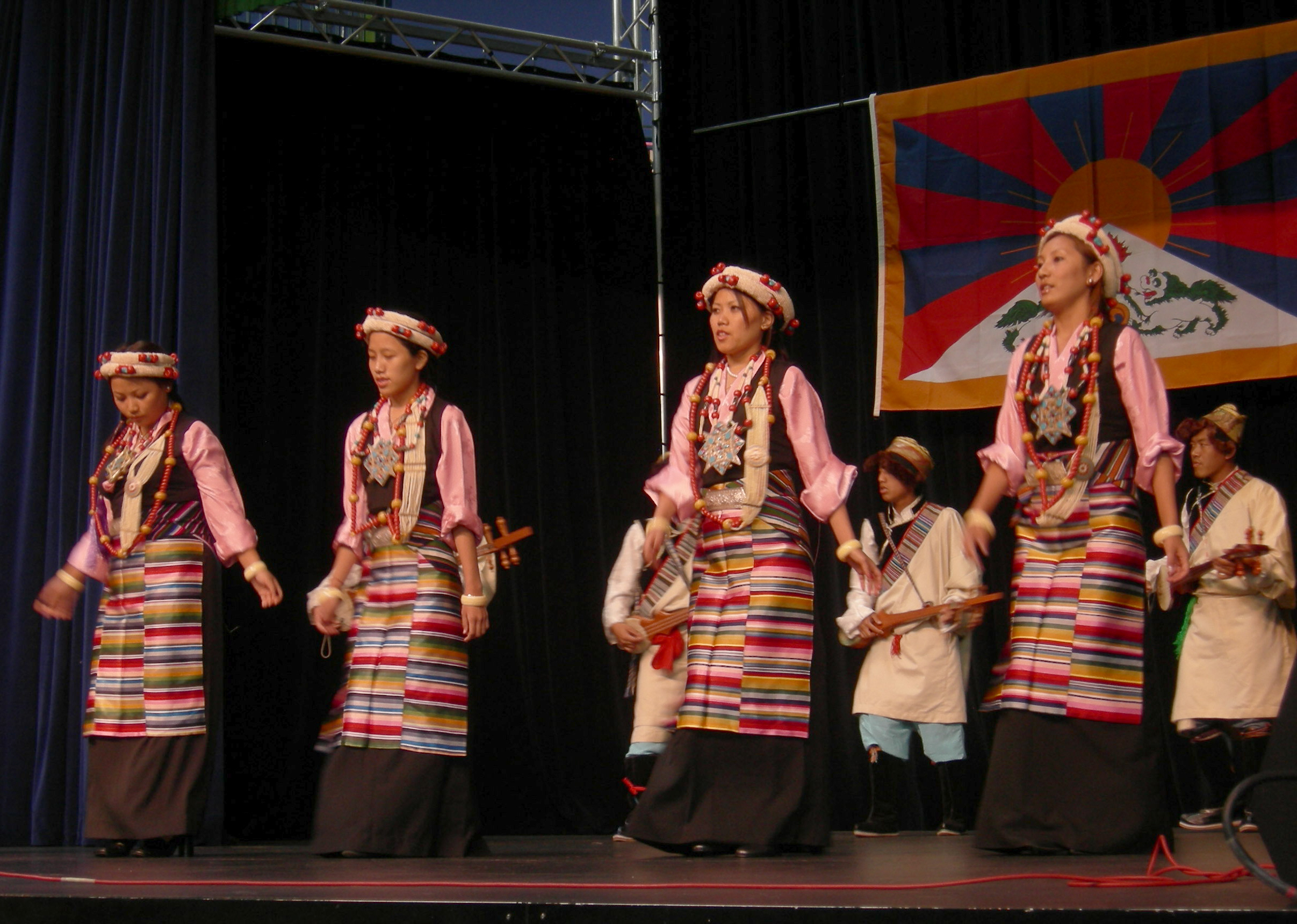
Tibetan dancers and musicians on Center House stage, Seattle Center as part of TibetFest (part of the Festál series).

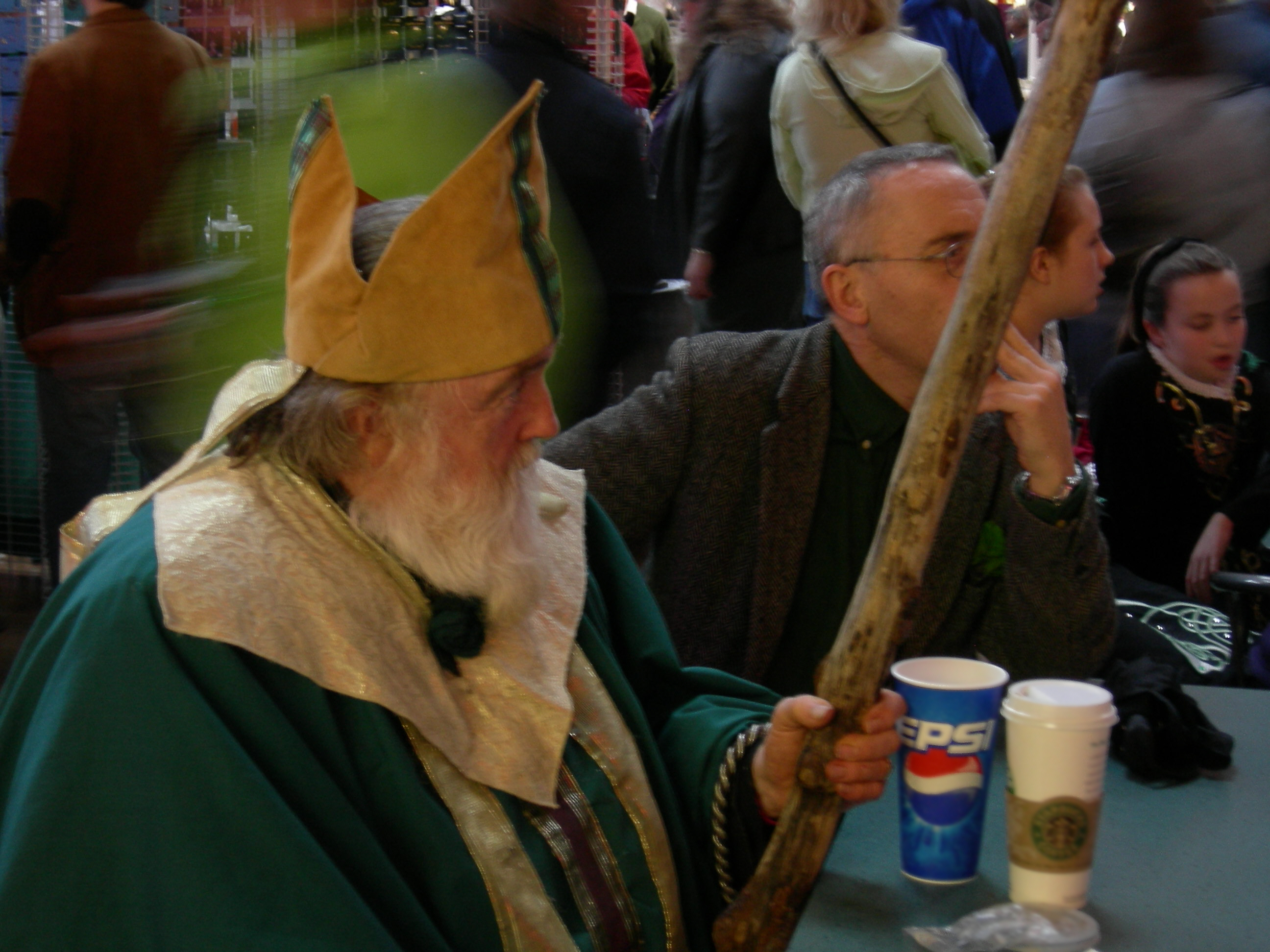
Man dressed as Saint Patrick, Irish Week Festival.

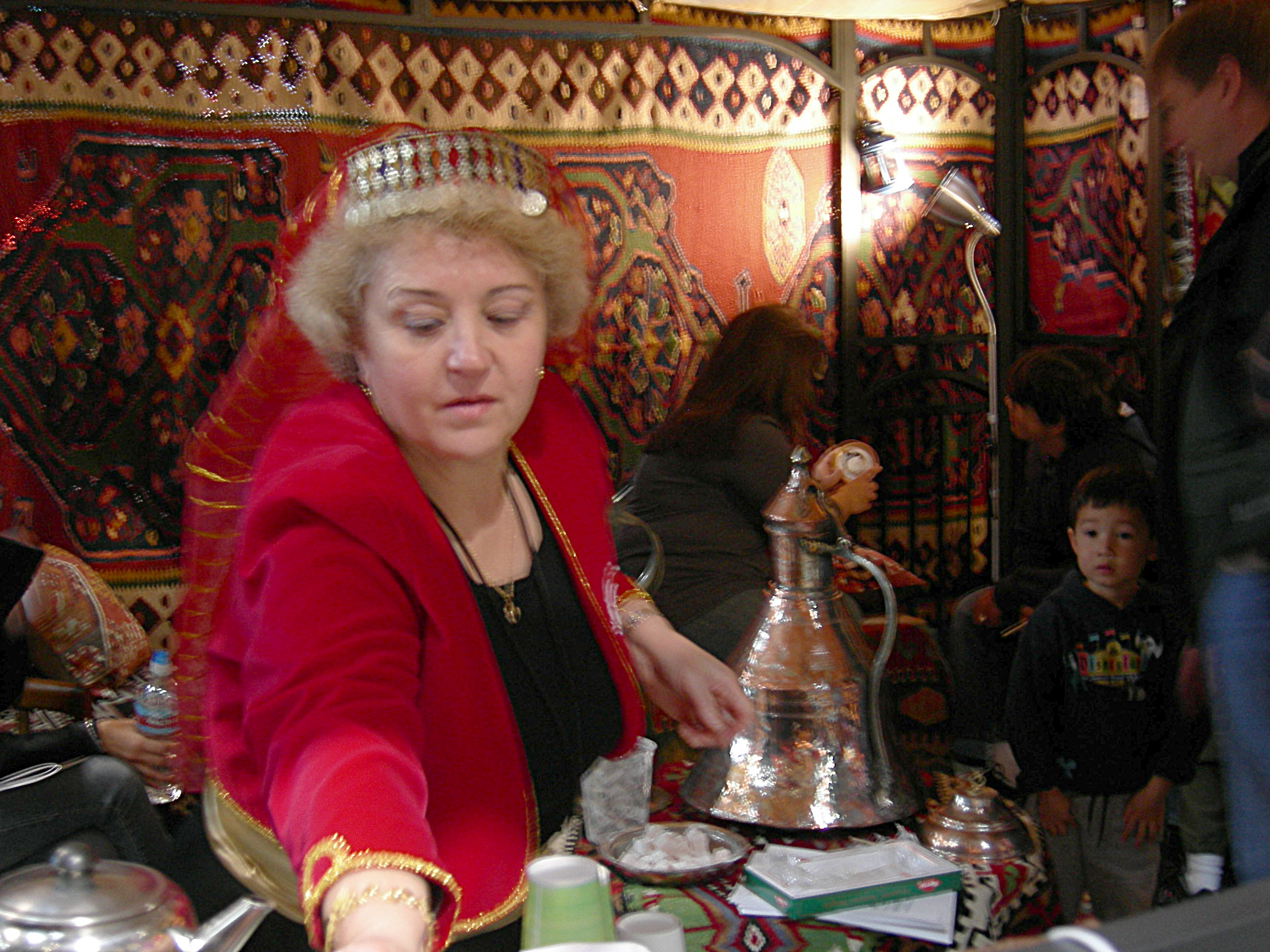
Temporary coffeehouse at Turkfest.

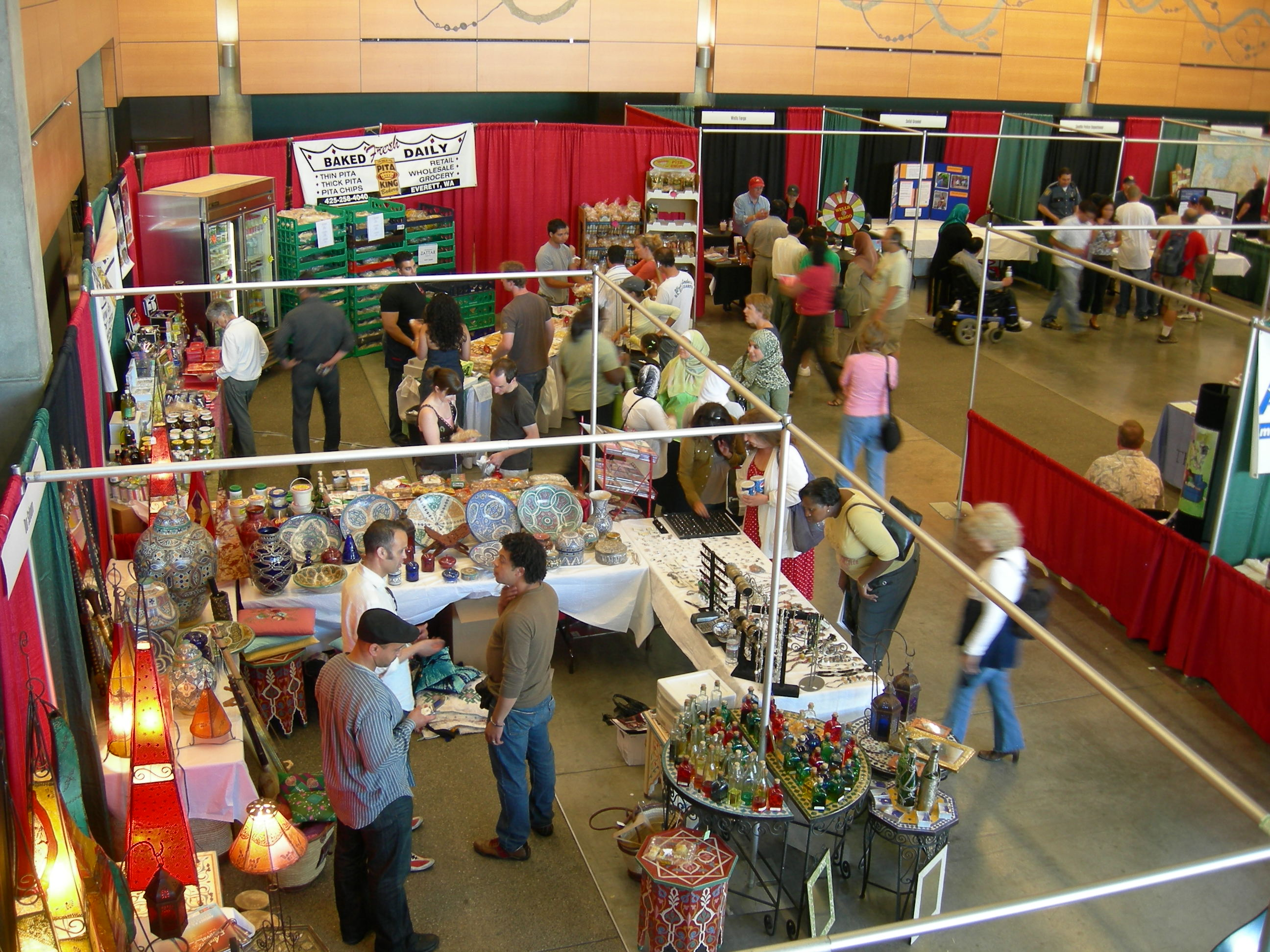
Bazaar at Arab Festival.

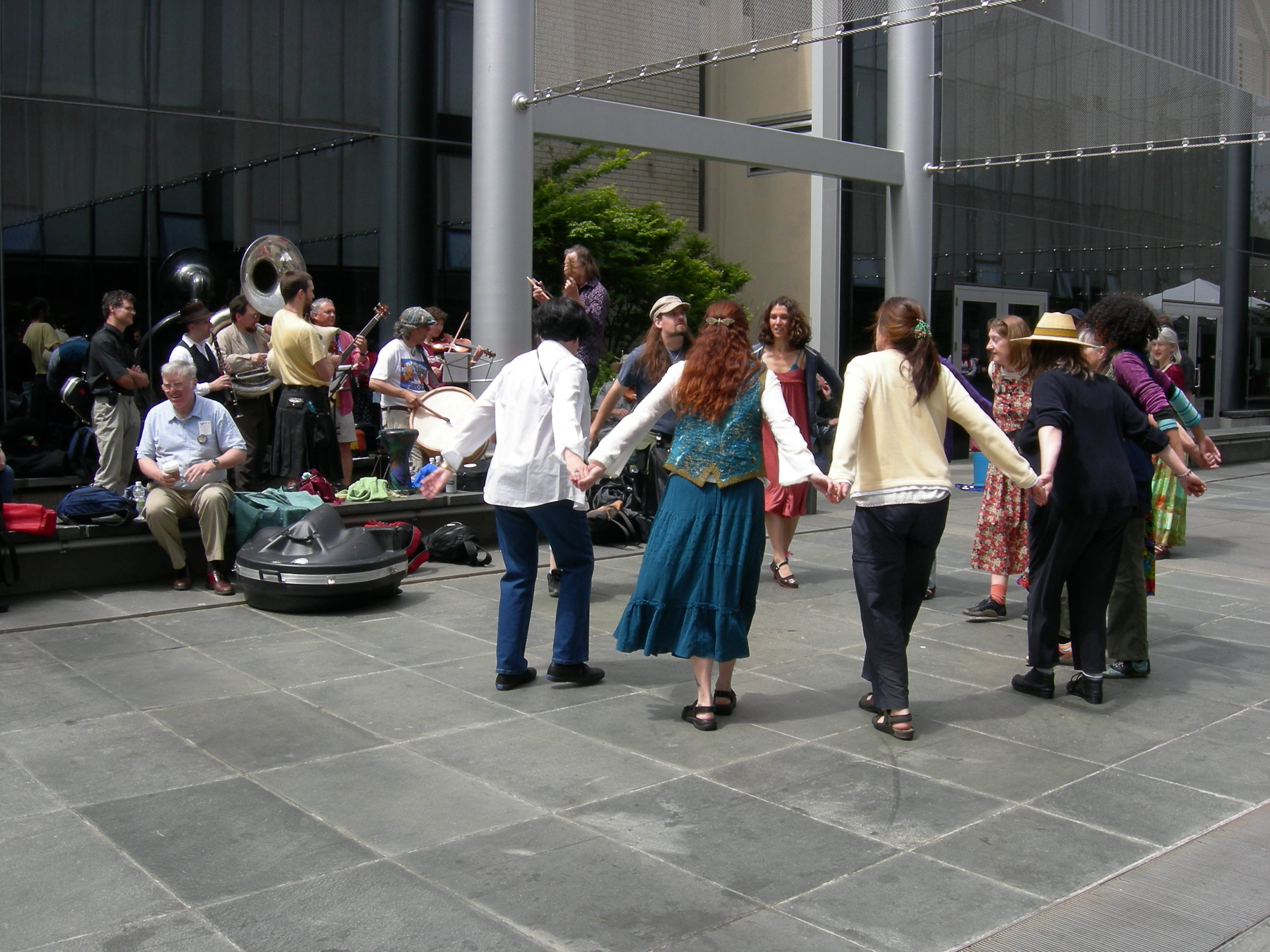
Impromptu circle dance at Folklife Festival.

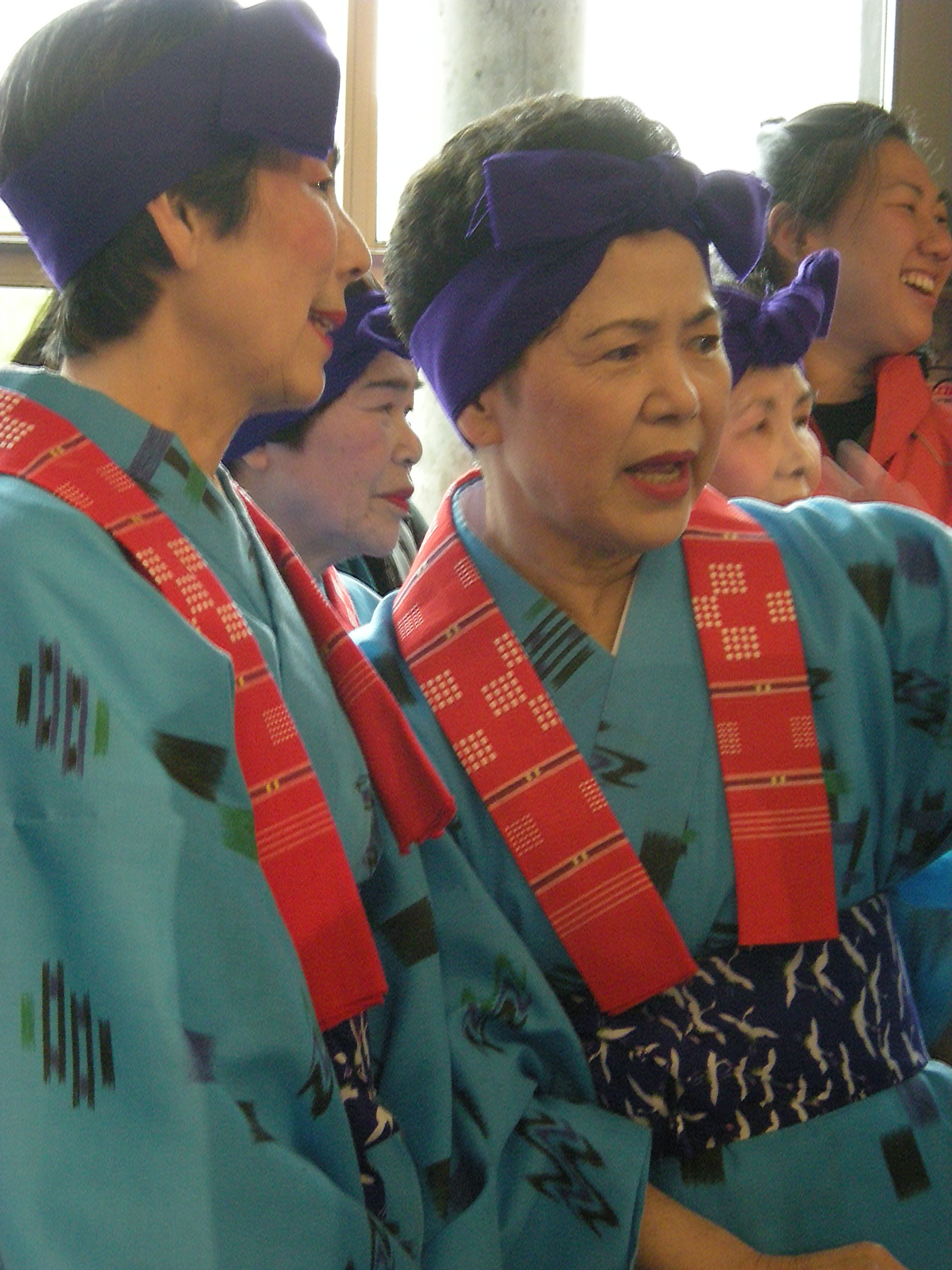
Japanese dancers prepare to perform at Cherry Blossom Festival.

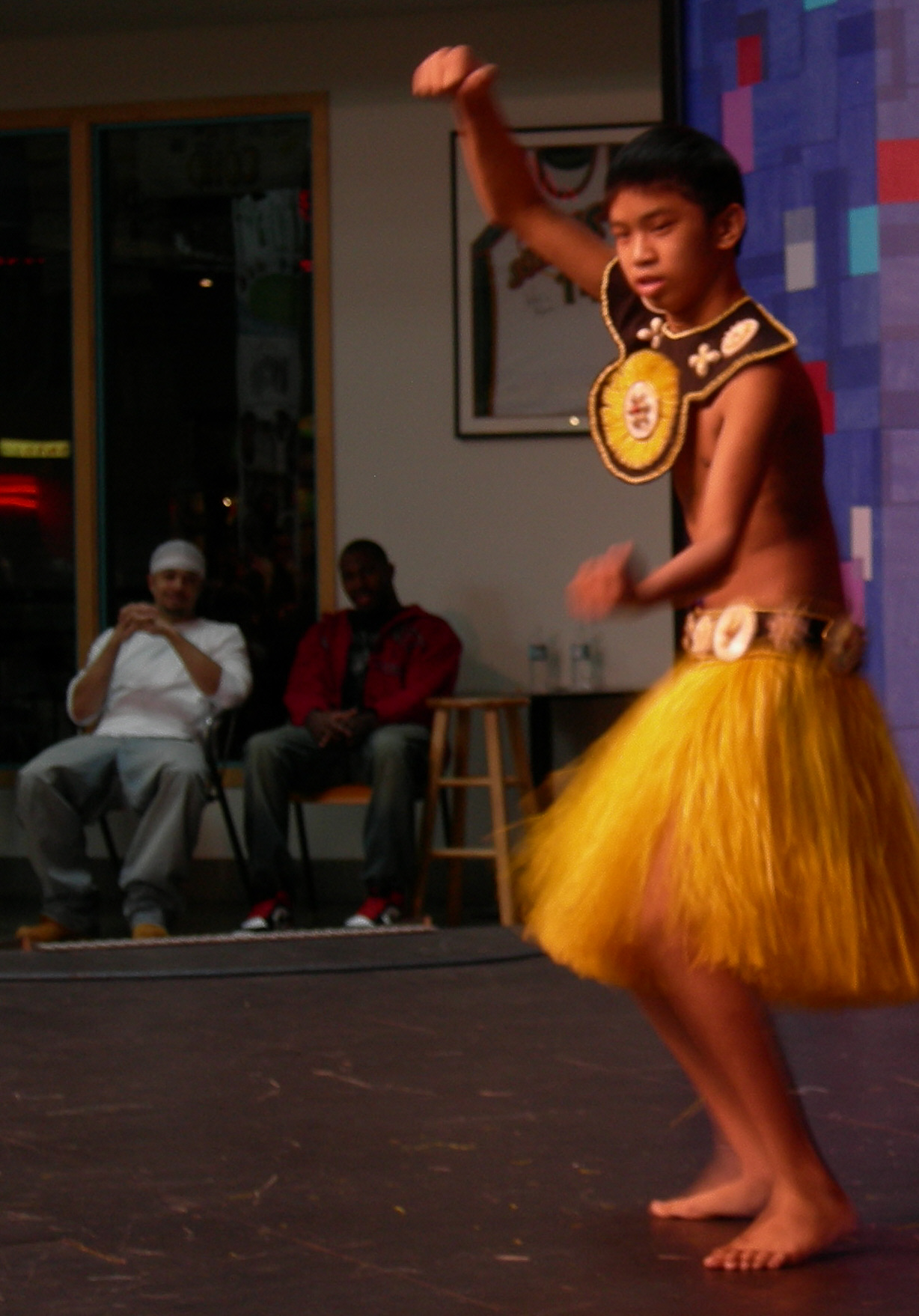
Young dancer at Asian-Pacific American Heritage Month Celebration.

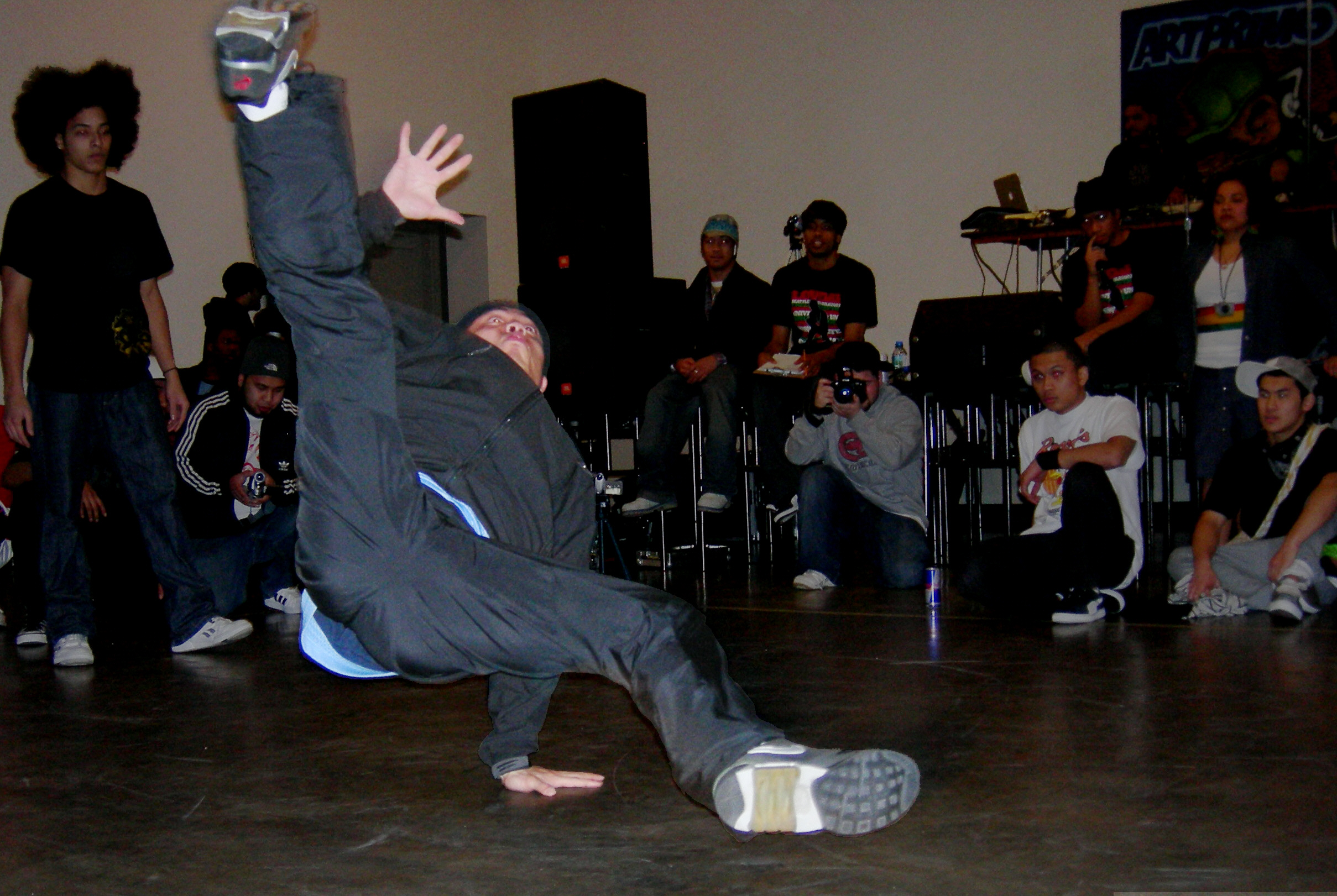
Breakdancing competition at Festival Sundiata.

Festál is a free series of annual ethnically-related festivals that take place on the grounds of Seattle Center in Seattle, Washington. A major cultural program of Seattle, these festivals aim to celebrate and connect the city to its varied ethnic and international community. Most festivals contain various arts performances (dances, theatre, musical ensembles, films), dances, marketplace and other programs. These have also come to be the annual gathering place for ethnic groups of the community. Both older and younger people attend, especially the dances and musical concerts.

The Festál events range enormously in scope, from smaller festivals to the enormous pan-ethnic Northwest Folklife Festival, which draws an estimated 250,000 visitors on Memorial Day weekend. Typical Festál events draw 5,000 to 30,000 visitors. Some of them (such as Fiestas Patrias) draw crowds that are predominantly of the ethnic group that is the focus of the festival; others draw more of a cross-section of the city.

Festál began in 1996. It was partially canceled for the COVID-19 pandemic in 2020 and conducted as a virtual event; the celebration returned to partial in-person gatherings for the following year.

== Vietnam: Têt Festival ==
The Têt Festival in February is the Vietnamese Lunar New Year celebration welcoming the return of spring. For the Vietnamese community, it is a time to reflect on the last year and prepare for the new. The new year is also the time for clearing debts and setting one's house in order. Kitchens are cleaned and new clothing is given to mark the new year. The festival includes Vietnamese artistic exhibits, music, storytelling, food, and a fashion show.

== African American: Festival Sundiata ==
Festal Sundiata in February is one of the oldest Seattle Center festivals, beginning in 1981. The festival is the most comprehensive African American festival in the city. Named to celebrate the West African Mansa (king of kings) of the Mali Empire, who rescued the Griot - his people's storyteller and tribal historian - Festival Sundiata is a represents diverse cultural traditions. Music and dance at the festival includes jazz, rap, gospel, hip-hop, R&B, and traditional African styles, all performed by northwest, national and international artists. The festival also includes Black Science Fiction Writers, Smokin' Black Chefs, children's activities, and visual art.

== Ireland: The Irish Week Festival ==
Irish Week Festival is centered on St. Patrick's Day in March, the celebration of Ireland's patron saint. The festival is presented by the Seattle Irish Heritage Club. Partly because Seattle and Ireland are very much alike in climate, Seattle and Galway are sister cities. The festival includes a St. Patrick's Day parade from downtown Seattle to Seattle Center. The Irish festival weekend includes traditional Irish step and gig dancing, musical performances, Irish films, and sing-alongs. The Seattle Genealogical Society appears annually to help anyone trace their Irish genealogy. Also featured are free lessons in Gaelic.

== Japan: Seattle Cherry Blossom & Japanese Cultural Festival ==
In April, the Seattle Cherry Blossom festival is held. The largest Japanese cultural event in the Pacific Northwest commemorates the late Japanese Prime Minister Takeo Miki's gift of 1,000 cherry trees, as part of the United States Bicentennial, to Seattle in 1976. The trees were planted along Lake Washington Boulevard, Seward Park, Seattle Center, The Arboretum, the Seattle Japanese Garden, University of Washington, and the Seattle Betsuin Buddhist Temple.

The cherry tree tradition follows at every year's festival, by bringing cherry tree experts from Japan to Seattle to teach Washingtonians about the proper care and maintenance of cherry trees. The cherry tree experts give instruction during the festival and the week that follows.

The festival's mission is to deepen mutual understanding between the people of Japan and the people of the Northwest; to exchange ideas and friendship; to promote the culture, arts, and technologies of Japan, including achievements of the Japanese-American community.

The festival includes dance and music, colorful costumes, martial arts, and tea ceremonies. For children, the festival offers Japanese games, kite making and kimono dress up.

== Asia-Pacific: Asian-Pacific American Heritage Month Celebration ==
May is designated as Asian Pacific Islander Heritage Month. In Seattle, the Asia-Pacific festival celebrates the diversity of China, Philippines, Samoa, Laos, Japan, Pacific Islands and Cambodia. The Asian Pacific Directors Coalition host the festival with cultural arts, entertainment and crafts. The performance showcase includes lion dance, youth drill teams, martial arts, taiko drums and guest artists from out of state.

== West Africa: Spirit of West Africa ==
In May, the Spirit of West Africa Festival presents the traditions of six West African countries through exhibits, live music, dance performances, and storytelling. Live performances by top local and touring artists from Ghana, Senegal, Benin, Nigeria, Gambia and Guinea demonstrate the African roots of hip hop, jazz and rock. In workshops presented by Thione Diop Productions, Festivalgoers can take part in drum and dance workshops, learn how a drum talks, and witness the healing drums of West African drum masters trained since birth to serve their communities.

== China: Chinese Culture and Arts Festival ==
Due to the large Chinese population in Seattle, the Chinese culture and arts festival is one of the best attended festivals. In June, the festival offers a comprehensive look at Chinese Culture through Chinese performing arts, visual arts display and gift/informational booths and interactive activities.

Performances are by artists from the Pacific Northwest and China. Performances have included Chinese Classical dance and Chinese folk dance from Hengda Dance Academy, Chinese music from Seattle Chinese Orchestra, Chinese Wushu from Yijiao Wushu & Taichi Academy, and Chinese music played on Western instruments from Zhenlun Cello studio and Haiying Violin Studio.

== Philippines: Pagdiriwang Philippine Festival ==
In June, the Seattle Philippine culture is celebrated. "Pagdiriwang" means celebration in Tagalog, as the festival commemorates Philippine independence from Spain in 1898. Performing arts include pageantry, music, dance, dill teams and rock bands. Other cultural activities include food, children's activities, exhibits and martial arts. This festival is noted for its rich colors and fabrics, its largely native turnout, and exceptional culinary arts.

== France: French Fest ==
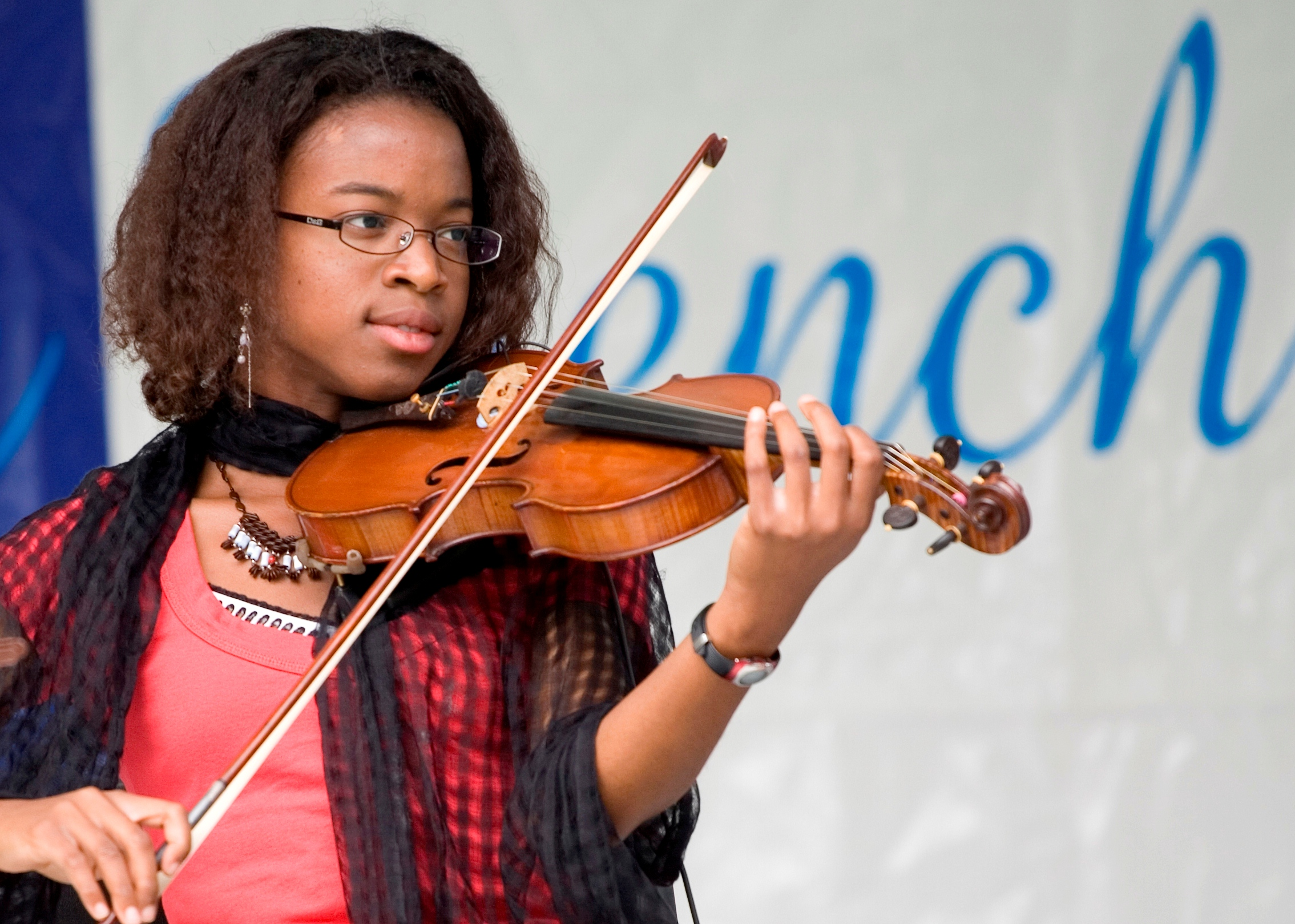
Madleen Gratien au violon 2010

Seattle's French Fest: A Celebration of French-Speaking Cultures is held in March of each year in celebration of the Mois de la Francophonie. The festival is a free, family-friendly event open to the public with the purpose of promoting and raising awareness of Francophone cultures and traditions from around the world to the residents of the Greater Seattle area. During the one-day event, festival-goers will listen to live music, see theater and dance performances, taste international cuisine, learn from informative seminars and demonstrations, play games and enjoy a day full of fun activities.

During its inaugural event on March 24, 2013, French Fest highlighted performances by Te Fare O Tamatoa, Folichon Cajun, the French Immersion School of Washington, Éducation Française Greater Seattle, Théâtre Français de Seattle, Podorythmie, the Alliance Française de Seattle Chior, and Pearl Django.

The festival is produced by France Education Northwest in partnership with the French-American Chamber of Commerce of the Pacific Northwest and the French Consular Agency of the State of Washington.

== Iran: Iranian Festival ==
In June, the Iranian Festival serves as the region's premier Iranian cultural event. Musical and dance performance, Rumi poetry, foods and libations, Persian New Year and holiday displays, an art exhibit, and puppet shows provide a glimpse into this rich and diverse culture. This event, previously independent, became be part of Festál as of 2009 and is presented by the Iranian American Community Alliance.

== Arab Middle East: Arab Festival ==
Held in October in 2011, the Arab Festival is of huge importance to Seattle, as Seattle holds one of the largest Arab American communities in the United States. Began in 1999, the festival includes all 22 of the Arab countries, with a souk marketplace, traditional and modern music, an authentic Arab coffeehouse, an Arabic spelling bee and fashion show. Lectures and workshops explore the rich culture and history of the Arab peoples, one of the world's oldest civilizations. Also of new interest is the Arabic rap concert, including the NW group Sons of Hagar, showcasing the political and creative struggle of Arabic youth.

This festival is held every-other year and may move dates based upon Ramadan.

== Brazil: BrasilFest ==
In August, BrasilFest features Brazilian drumbeats and the samba rhythms of Brazilian Folklore Day, August 22. The festival combines traditional and contemporary cultures of Brazil, and is the only U.S. festival to showcase this large an amount of Brazilian performing arts. The music includes both traditional and contemporary pieces, drawn from African and Portuguese roots. The festival also features the unique Brazilian martial art/dance capoeira, costumes, food and contemporary arts.

== Tibet: TibetFest ==
In late August, Tibet comes alive once again at Seattle Center. The ancient cultural tradition is preserved and renewed through ritual and tradition by the small Tibetan Community in greater Seattle area. With centuries-old stories, melodies, masks and costumes, modern and ancient combine to form the culture of Tibet. Highlights are a Tibetan bazaar, prayer flags, performers and food.

The Artists use traditional instruments like Dra-nyen, piwang and unique combinations of flutes, horns, drums, bells and cymbals.

== Korea: Korean Cultural and Art Festival ==
The September Korean Festival is one of the most important festivals. Strong ties link trade, culture and family between Korea and Seattle. Every year, the festival falls on Ch'usok, or Harvest Festival Day, one of the great holidays of the year in Korean culture.

On festival day feasts are prepared, families hold memorial services at ancestral gravesites, and full-moon viewing takes place in the evening. This Korean holiday is considered not only generous in spirit, but a day of thanksgiving for a good harvest. Similar to Lunar New Year's Day, families come home from all across the country to celebrate together.

The festival includes folk songs, traditional and modern dance, martial arts like Tae Kwon Do, films and exhibits that depict a Korean cultural evolution over thousands of years. A highlight is the elaborate student art competition and exhibition. Korean traditional costumes are worn by performers, with rich and elaborate fabrics and designs.

== Hawai`i: Live Aloha Hawaiian Cultural Festival ==
In September, the Live Aloha Hawaiian Cultural Festival, new to Festál in 2009, celebrates the culture of Native Hawai`i. Some of the over 50,000 Hawaiian Islanders who now call Washington their home share their homeland's history through live performances of the hula and Mele as well as historical exhibits, films, Hawaiian crafts, keiki (children's) activities and ono (delicious) food. The festival features special demonstrations and educational sessions on traditional arts and crafts. Presented by the Live Aloha Hawaiian Cultural Festival Committee.

== Mexico and Latin America: Fiestas Patrias ==
Held in September, Seattle Fiestas Patrias celebrates Mexican independence and the independence of other Latin American countries. In commemoration of Mexico's September 15 independence day, the festival is decked out in Mexican colors.

Entertainment and cultural displays by artists from countries such as Peru, Honduras, Argentina, Mexico and Colombia offer an authentic look at a culture where countries share language, food and sounds, but have very distinct traditions. Favorites of the festival include the mariachi music, salsa dance, traditional costumes, and food.

== Italy: Festa Italiana ==
Started in 1988, Festa Italiana is presented every September, and along with the Irish and Cherry Blossom Festivals, is one of the most highly attended. The festival celebrates traditional Italian culture, as well as mixing in modern Italian performances, art, cars and food. Highlighted every year are traditional Italian folk groups, Italian opera music by sopranos and pop singers, evening wine tasting, and puppet theater.

Italian celebrity chef Nick Stellino prepares Italian dishes for an audience. Annual favorites are the grape stomp and bocce ball tournament - frequented by renowned local players every year. Italian-American musical group the EuroRhythms are also performers.

== Croatia: CroatiaFest ==
In the beginning of October, CroatiaFest brings in internationally acclaimed folk dance ensembles, musicians and visiting arts. Back-to-back performances and participatory music and dance define this annual festival, started in 2003. The 2007 festival theme was "Maritime Heritage of Croatians". Many Croatian immigrants had seafaring skills culled on the warm and mild Adriatic, and upon their arrival in the Pacific Northwest, found work in the maritime industries on the Pacific. Career fishermen present a workshop on mending nets, as other Croatians share their life experiences and culture.

== South Asia: Utsav South Asian Performing Arts Festival ==
During the second weekend of October, the Ustav festival showcases the ancient traditions of music and dance of the South Asian subcontinent. South Asia includes Afghanistan, Bangladesh, Bhutan, India, Maldives, Nepal, Pakistan and Sri Lanka. Artists perform art forms including the Indian lute and the much loved sitar, with vocalists and yogic dance and drama with rhythms of dancing bells and foot beats.

There are more than 1,652 different languages and dialects spoken in India alone. South Asia as a whole constitutes the largest Muslim population in the world and is the birthplace of some of the world's largest religions: Hinduism, Buddhism, and Sikhism.

== Turkey: TurkFest ==
Held in the third weekend of October, TurkFest is a festival of friendship, celebrating the cultural richness and diversity found throughout the vast geographical regions of Turkey, linking cultures east and west, from Hittites and Assyrians to Hellenes, Romans and Byzantines. Traditional folk dancing, a Turkish bazaar, classical and contemporary Turkish music, and a fashion show of the many traditional costumes are festival highlights. Shadow puppetry is presented especially for the children, while Turkish food is always a festival favorite.

== Mexico: Día de Muertos ==
Día de Muertos (Day of the Dead) is a Mexican tradition rooted in Aztec culture, which celebrates life and the lives of those departed. A holiday that pays tribute to ancestors, the festival is centered on the arts of altar decoration. Candlelight graces altars adorned with vibrantly colored artwork and personal artifacts. Performing artists, both local and visiting, traditional and contemporary, represent countries throughout Latin America. Of special note is the street sandpainting. Traditionally, streets are decorated with sand paintings that are later swept away, symbolizing the fleeting nature of our lives.

== Hmong: Hmong New Year Celebration ==
A festival well attended by both Hmong and non-Hmong people, this is the largest of the Hmong New Year events in the Pacific Northwest. The November event symbolizes the end of the harvest, this is the time when Hmong relax, prepare special foods, and begin courtships. Most Hmong have been in the United States less than 30 years, and Washington's Hmong population is growing.

The festival was originally conceived to raise awareness about the Hmong people, who aided the U.S. in the Vietnam War against the Vietcong. Most of their population was killed as a result, and most survivors emigrated to the U.S.

This festival marks the Lunar New Year of this Southeast Asian highland culture originating in the mountains of China, Laos and Thailand. Hmong people preserved their stories and language through intricate storytelling, embroidery, music and unusual communication techniques. Highlights include traditional ball-tossing, dances, children's activities, a fashion show and a Hmong band. Exhibits include the history of the Hmong settlement in King County, along with traditional embroideries.

== Festivals ==
- Naturalization ceremony on U.S. Independence Day
- Northwest Folklife Festival, held in May

== See also ==
- International District, Seattle, Washington
