= Golden Delicious (disambiguation) =

Golden Delicious is a type of apple.

Golden Delicious may also refer to:

- Golden Delicious (album), a 2008 album by Mike Doughty
- Golden Delicious (band), a musical group from Portland, Oregon
- Golden Delicious (film), a 2022 drama film
