= Cavity Search Records =

US record label

- Founded: 1992
- Founder: Denny Swofford, Christopher Cooper
- Status: Active
- Distributors: CD Baby, ThinkIndie
- Genre: Alternative rock, folk, experimental
- Country of origin: United States
- Location: Portland, Oregon
- Official website: cavitysearchrecords.com

Cavity Search Records is a record label in Portland, Oregon, which was formed in 1992 by Christopher Cooper and Denny Swofford. Pete Krebs' debut solo record "Brigadier" released on CSR in 1995. Elliott Smith's debut record "Roman Candle" released on CSR in 1995.

Cavity Search Records was inducted into the Oregon Music Hall of Fame in 2023.

Christopher Cooper passed on February 12, 2018.

== Artists ==
The following artists have released records on Cavity Search:

- Atomic 61
- Barra Brown
- Control Freak
- Danny Barnes
- Devin Millar
- dirtclodfight
- Down Gown
- Elliott Sharp
- Elliott Smith
- Film Star
- Gentlemen of Leisure
- Gern Blanston
- Greg Gilmore/Doghead
- Golden Delicious
- Hazel
- Heatmiser
- The Helio Sequence
- Jerry Joseph
- Jesse Daniel Edwards
- King Black Acid
- Korgy & Bass
- Lauren Lakis
- Robert Wynia
- Mike Scheer
- Pete Krebs
- Queen Chief
- Rattlecake
- Richmond Fontaine
- Satan's Pilgrims
- Saul Conrad
- Snow Bud and the Flower People
- Steve Drizos
- Steve Lacy
- Survival Skills
- Thrillhammer
- Trailer Queen
- Travis Shallow
- Wayne Horvitz
- Will Hattman

== Discography ==
Cavity Search Records: albums and singles
Cat #	Title	Artist	Year
CSR001	"J. Hell" b/w "Day-Glo"/"Joe Louis Punchout"	Hazel	1992
CSR002	"Stray" b/w "Can't Be Touched"/"Wake"	Heatmiser	1993
CSR003	"The Other White Meat" b/w "Salt Peter"	Atomic 61	1993
CSR004	"Heavy as a Chevy" b/w "Beware of the Camper Man"	Trailer Queen	1993
CSR005	"Emma's Thread" b/w "Sucker"	Control Freak	1993
CSR006	Live in Texas split	Atomic 61 with dirtclodfight	1993
CSR007	"Sleeping Pill b/w "Temper"	Heatmiser	1993
CSR008	"Kind of Dead" b/w "Pattern 56 Interlude"	Wayne Horvitz with Pigpen	1994
CSR009	"Headbag" b/w "Radon"	Gern Blanston/Thirty Ought Six	1994
CSR010	Satan's Pilgrims EP	Satan's Pilgrims	1994
CSR011	"Wintogreen" b/w "King Twist"	Hazel	1994
CSR012	Low Animal Cunning	Control Freak	1994
CSR013	Roman Candle	Elliott Smith	1994
CSR014	Gern Blanston	Gern Blanston	1994
CSR015	Doghead	Greg Gilmore/Doghead	1996
CSR016	Tinnitus in Extremis	Atomic 61	1994
CSR017	Hymnal	dirtclodfight	1995
CSR018	Boodlers	Elliott Sharp with Boodlers	1995
CSR019	Brigadier	Pete Krebs	1995
CSR020	Japanese split	Control Freak with Stymie	1995
CSR021	Purity of Essence	Atomic 61	1995
CSR022	Live in Poland	Wayne Horvitz	1995
CSR023	NO.1 (Various Artists)	Smegma, Rectal Pizza, Matt Schulte, Hugh Swofford	1995
CSR024	Actuality	Steve Lacy	1995
CSR025	"Everybody Has It" b/w "Dirty Dream"	Heatmiser	1996
CSR026	NO.2 (Various Artists)	Sissyface/Hutch/Ten-Four/Vehicle	1996
CSR027	Rattlecake	Rattlecake	1995
CSR028	Womb Star Session	King Black Acid	1995
CSR029	Wa Wa Wa	Rattlecake	1996
CSR030	Goodbye Blue Monday	Atomic 61	1996
CSR031	Western Electric	Pete Krebs	1997
CSR032	Cletus...	Golden Delicious	1996
CSR033	Monologue	Wayne Horvitz	1997
CSR034	Sunlit EP	King Black Acid	1996
CSR035	Mic City Sons	Heatmiser	1996
CSR036	Safety	Richmond Fontaine	1996
CSR037	Totally Without Products	Rattlecake	1997
CSR038	Royal Subjects	King Black Acid	1997
CSR039	Old School	Golden Delicious	1997
CSR040	"Happiness" b/w "Son of Sam"	Elliott Smith	1999
CSR041	Com Plex	The Helio Sequence	2000
CSR042	Miles From	Richmond Fontaine	1997
CSR043	Rwong Territory	Elliott Sharp & DJ Soul Slinger	1998
CSR044	The Rent	Steve Lacy Trio	1999
CSR045	Cavity Search Split EP	Pete Krebs/Golden Delicious	1998
CSR046	Sweet Ona Rose	Pete Krebs and the Gossamer Wings	1999
CSR047	Live at the Laurelthirst	Golden Delicious	1999
CSR048	Loves a Long Song	King Black Acid	2000
CSR049	Lost Son	Richmond Fontaine	1999
CSR050	Bittersweet Valentines EP	Pete Krebs	1999
CSR051	I Know It By Heart	Pete Krebs and the Gossamer Wings	2002
CSR052	Minor Dings	Danny Barnes	2000
CSR053	Duet for Clarinet and Goat	Pete Krebs & Danny Barnes	2001
CSR055	Cavity Search Audio Resumé	Various	2000
CSR056	Young Effectuals	The Helio Sequence	2001
CSR057	Hot Ginger and Dynamite	Pete Krebs and the Kung Pao Chickens	2001
CSR059	Gentlemen of Leisure	Gentlemen of Leisure	2001
CSR062	Flashback	Snow Bud and the Flower People	2012
CSR063	Everything That Isn't	dirtclodfight	1991
CSR064	Hunting Lesson	dirtclodfight	1993
CSR065	Suffering the Aftertaste	dirtclodfight	1994
CSR066	Counter Fit	Elliott Sharp with Boodlers	1997
CSR067	Slide Away	King Black Acid	2011
CSR068	Let's Burn Those Stars	King Black Acid	2012
CSR069	Giftless	Thrillhammer	1992
CSR070	Always Crashing the Same Car	King Black Acid	2013
CSR071	Behind Blue Eyes	King Black Acid	2012
CSR072	Poison Packets	Saul Conrad	2012
CSR073	The Main Sequence	dirtclodfight	2014
CSR074	The Fancy LP	Saul Conrad	2013
CSR075	The Fancy (single and video)	Saul Conrad	2013
CSR076	I'm Rolling Under	King Black Acid	2014
CSR077	I Was Talking (single and video)	Saul Conrad	2014
CSR078	A Tyrant and Lamb	Saul Conrad	2014
CSR079	Queen Chief EP	Queen Chief	2014
CSR080	EPcoh EP	Barra Brown and the Wishermen	2014
CSR081	Curves	Survival Skills	2015
CSR082	Sea of Unrest (single)	King Black Acid	2015
CSR083	Film Star	Film Star	1997
CSR084	Tranquil Eyes	Film Star	1998
CSR085	Deep Space	Survival Skills	2015
CSR086	Halfrack	Wayne Horvitz & Pigpen	1993
CSR087	Miss Ann	Wayne Horvitz & Pigpen	1994
CSR088	Daylight	Wayne Horvitz & Pigpen	1997
CSR089	EP Vol. 1	Korgy & Bass	2016
CSR090	Live in Portland	Hazel	2016
CSR091	Down Gown	Down Gown	2017
CSR092	Hey Pete Krebs!	Pete Krebs	2016
CSR093	Adolescence (single)	Devin Millar	2016
CSR094	The Reckoning EP	dirtclodfight	2016
CSR095	Bitter Horizon (single)	Korgy & Bass	2017
CSR096	Twin Flames EP	King Black Acid	2017
CSR097	Poem Project	Barra Brown	2017
CSR098	Brave the Strange	Robert Wynia	2017
CSR099	Super Beautiful Magic	King Black Acid	2017
CSR100	Brother	Saul Conrad	2018
CSR101	Oceanus Procellarum	Ensemble Resonanz, Elliott Sharp & Gareth Davis	2017
CSR102	EP Vol. 2	Korgy & Bass	2017
CSR103	Weird Blood	Jerry Joseph	2017
CSR104	Sunlit (Deluxe Edition)	King Black Acid	2018
CSR105	Full Metal Burqa	Jerry Joseph	2018
CSR106	Edge of Summer	Survival Skills	2018
CSR107	"I'm in Love With a Girl" b/w "Superstar"	King Black Acid	2018
CSR108	Animal Stories	Queen Chief	2019
CSR109	Lead Us On (single)	Lauren Lakis	2018
CSR110	Ferocious	Lauren Lakis	2018
CSR111	Calling All Earthlings	Elliott Sharp	2018
CSR112	26000:4=2500	Korgy & Bass	2018
CSR113	Grand and Humble (single)	Devin Millar	2019
CSR114	Raverborg (single)	Barra Brown	2019
CSR115	Blues, Hues, & Views	William Schimmel & Elliott Sharp	2019
CSR116	2500=4:26000	Korgy & Bass	2019
CSR119	Right Now (single)	Lauren Lakis	2019
CSR120	Sad Girl Breakfast	Lauren Lakis	2019
CSR121	Remote	Korgy & Bass & Cyrus Nabipoor	2019
CSR122	All My Friends Are Ghosts	Pete Krebs & The Gossamer Wings	2020
CSR123	Elk Park EP	Michael Elkins & Shawn Parke	2020
CSR124	HZL	Hazel	2025
CSR125	Agrocrag	Korgy & Bass	2020
CSR126	Bosozoku	Thirty Ought Six	2020
CSR127	Next Bus (single)	Korgy & Bass	2020
CSR128	Half a Tick (single)	Korgy & Bass	2020
CSR129	Sorry in the Summer	Impulsive Hearts	2016
CSR130	Cry All the Time	Impulsive Hearts	2020
CSR131	On the Farm	Saul Conrad	2020
CSR132	Speak With Your Heart (single)	André Paraguassu	2020
CSR133	Let It Pass (single)	Travis Shallow	2020
CSR134	Color Safe (single)	Steve Drizos	2020
CSR135	Secret of You (single)	Jesse Daniel Edwards	2020
CSR136	Wolves (single)	Kimberly Henninger & Shawn Parke	2020
CSR137	No More Vodka (single)	Mary Ryan	2020
CSR138	Dearie (single)	Danielle Sines	2020
CSR139	Flowers on My Feet (single)	Hannah Zhalih Mickunas	2020
CSR140	Cavity Search 2020	Various Artists	2020
CSR141	Permanent Solution	Survival Skills	2020
CSR142	Don't Wake Me (single)	Barra Brown	2020
CSR143	These Souls	Barra Brown	2020
CSR144	Live at Presonus	Korgy & Bass & Cyrus Nabipoor	2020
CSR145	Axiom	Steve Drizos	2021
CSR146	Static (single)	Steve Drizos	2020
CSR147	Agrocrag (remixes}	Korgy & Bass	2020
CSR148	Ride (single)	Barra Brown	2021
CSR149	Whoa Hey! (single)	Barra Brown	2021
CSR150	Noah (single)	Barra Brown	2021
CSR151	LFT:RT	Barra Brown	2021
CSR152	Caterpillar Blood (single)	King Black Acid	2021
CSR153	Somebody: They Want to Fuck You (single)	King Black Acid & The Rainbow Lodge	2021
CSR154	Kaw-Liga (single)	Queen Chief	2021
CSR155	Don't Want My Life to be Like That (single)	King Black Acid & The Rainbow Lodge	2021
CSR156	In My Eyes (single)	Queen Chief	2021
CSR157	Never Alone (feat. Robert Wynia) (single)	King Black Acid	2021
CSR158	In the Video (single)	Survival Skills	2021
CSR159	I Wanna Get You High (single)	King Black Acid	2021
CSR160	Move Along (single)	King Black Acid	2021
CSR161	We, The Product	Jesse Daniel Edwards	2022
CSR162	One of My Favorite Things (single)	King Black Acid & The Rainbow Lodge	2021
CSR163	Brooklyn 97202 (single)	Steve Drizos	2023
CSR164	The Rainbow Lodge	King Black Acid	2023
CSR165	Fit 4 the Apocalypse	Impulsive Hearts	2024
CSR166	American Dreaming	Jesse Daniel Edwards	2023
CSR167	It Gets Worse Every Year	Will Hattman	2020
CSR168	Pete Krebs Trio	Pete Krebs	2008
CSR169	Belief Is What Will Bring Us Down	Will Hattman	2022
CSR170	I'm So Happy (I Think I Might Cry) (single)	Jesse Daniel Edwards	2023
CSR171	Violensia	Jesse Daniel Edwards	2023
CSR172	Act I;Circle Turning Round Upon Itself	Indigo Zeros	2025
CSR173	Katie (single)	Steve Drizos	2023
CSR174	Shadow Life (single)	Steve Drizos	2024
CSR175	I Love You Now Leave Me Alone	Steve Drizos	2024
CSR176	The Fox (single)	Jesse Daniel Edwards	2024
CSR177	Clap Trap Venus	Jesse Daniel Edwards	2024
CSR178	I'm So Happy (I Think I Might Cry) (Piano Version, Memphis) (single)	Jesse Daniel Edwards	2025
CSR179	Victory For Mad Love	King Black Acid	2024
CSR180	Jesse Daniel Edwards	Jesse Daniel Edwards	2025
CSR181	Treading Water (single)	Steve Drizos	2025
CSR182	Loneliness Finds Her Own Way (single)	Steve Drizos	2025
CSR183	Dream School Dropout	Birdie Swann Sisters & King Black Acid	2025
CSR184	YKILY (2.0 Version) (single)	Impulsive Hearts	2025
CSR185	Sve Yrself (single)	Impulsive Hearts	2025
CSR186	WASP (single)	Impulsive Hearts	2025
CSR187	Requiem Mass/Catechism En Masse	Jesse Daniel Edwards	2025

== Bibliography ==
Cavity Search Publishing
Cat. #	Title	Author(s)	ISBN	Year
CSP1	Laundromatsmell	Mike Scheer	ISBN 9780964991705	1997
CSP3	Songs For Hungry Ghosts	Phil Merwin	ISBN 9798218694463	2026

== Distribution ==
Early in its history, Cavity Search records were distributed by Alternative Distribution Alliance, an American company founded in 1993. In May 2012 Cavity Search was announced as one of the first nine labels to join the newly formed Frenchkiss Label Group. Frenchkiss Records, founded by Syd Butler, had started the distribution company earlier that year, which is "focused on growing visibility for indie labels in the spirit of communities such as Dischord, Rough Trade and Touch & Go." At that point, Frenchkiss had ceased its affiliation with RED and had begun working with The Orchard.

== See also ==
- List of record labels
