= King Black Acid =

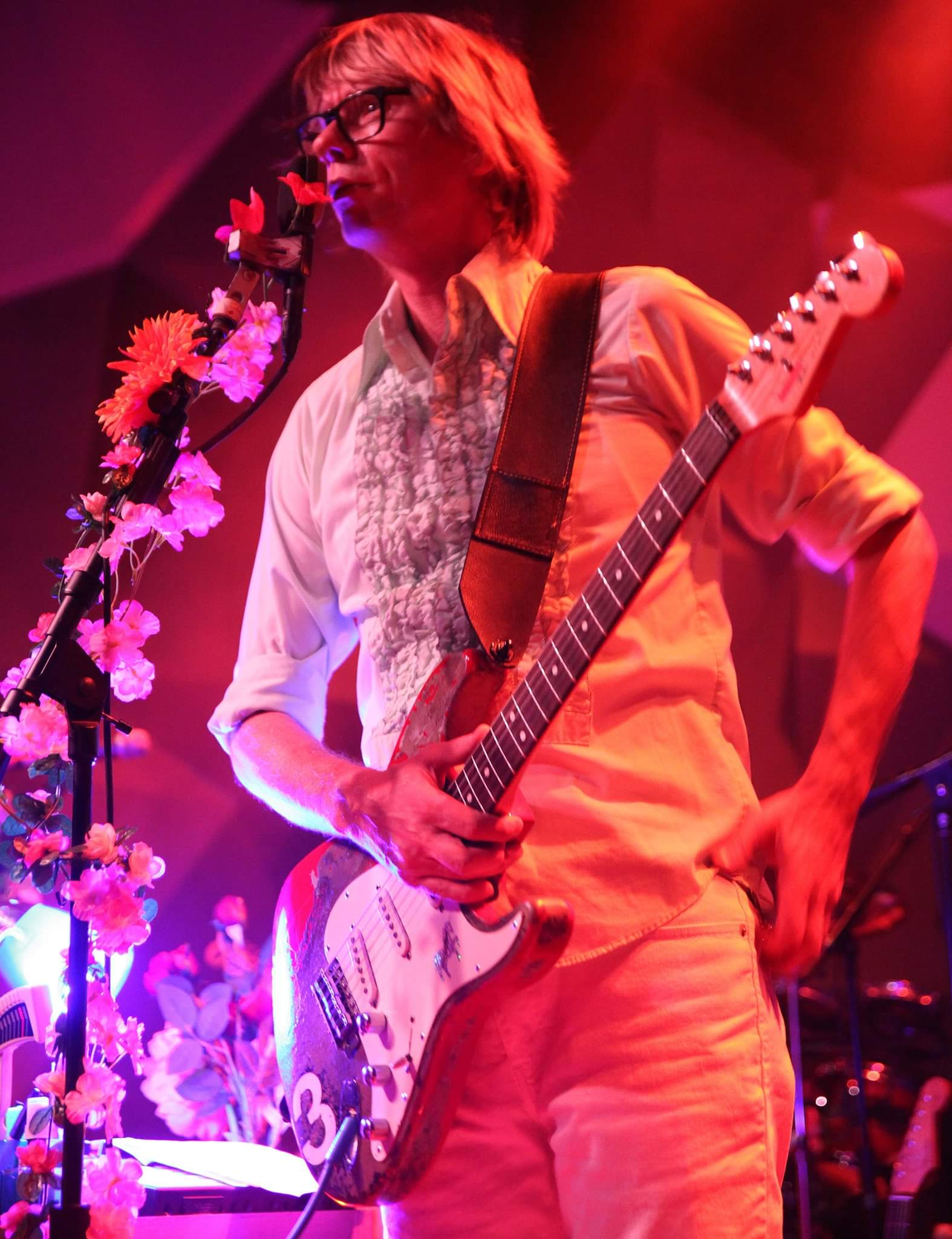
- Daniel Riddle (King Black Acid) performing live in 2019

Background information
- Origin: Portland, Oregon, United States
- Genres: Space rock, neo-psychedelia, indie rock
- Years active: 1993–present
- Labels: Cavity Search, Lakeshore Records, Mazinga Records, Ruckus
- Website: kingblackacidmusic.com/home

Daniel John Riddle is an American musician best known by his pseudonym King Black Acid.

== Early life and career ==
Riddle began recording music under the name King Black Acid as a high school student in the late 1980s while also bassist for Portland industrial rock band Hitting Birth. Since then Riddle has worked with an ever-changing collective of musicians, referred to as the Electric Chair Band (1993), the Womb Star Orchestra (1993-1997), the Starseed Transmission (1997-2001), the 144,000 Piece Acid Army (2002-2003), and the Sacred Heart (2006-2009). All King Black Acid material is written and produced by Riddle, who sings and plays guitar during live shows, and who plays a variety of other instruments in the recording studio. Riddle also operates a recording studio, Mazinga Studio, where he produces records under the name King Black Acid. In addition to several studio releases, King Black Acid has recorded music for several film and TV soundtracks including The Mothman Prophecies, Underworld: Rise of the Lycans, Zig Zag, CSI: Miami, and Buffy the Vampire Slayer.

== Collaborators ==
Many musicians have contributed to King Black Acid recordings and live shows. Only the primary contributors are listed below.

- Electric Chair Band consisted of Roger Campos (guitar), Melinda DiCillo (keyboards, Hitting Birth), and Nathon Jorg (bass).
- Womb Star Orchestra consisted of Roger Campos (guitar), Melinda DiCillo (keyboards), Scott Adamo (drums, Hitting Birth/Wipers/Blackjack), and Joseph Trump (percussion, Pigface/Elliott Sharp's Carbon). A different bassist contributed to each studio recording; they included Mitch Brown, Steve Dorris, and Dan Eccles.
- Starseed Transmission consisted of Sarah Mayfield (guitar), Scott Adamo (drums), Bobek Djeyfroudi (bass), and Pete Ficht (keyboards, Wild Bells).
- 144,000 Piece Acid Army consisted of Sarah Mayfield (guitar), Joseph Trump (drums), Rich Landar (keyboards, Tin Silver/The Hill Williams), Sean Farrell (synthesizer, Wild Bells), and Sean Tichner (bass, Wild Bells).
- Sacred Heart consisted of Jeff Trapp (guitar, Everclear), Amanda Machina (guitar and vocals), Joseph Trump (drums), Rich Landar (keyboards), and Erik Mimnaugh (bass).
- The Rainbow Lodge consisted of Bryan Owens (guitar), Rich Landar (keyboards), Jonathan Moore (keyboards), Jordan Ruback (drums), and Erik Mimnaugh (bass).

== Discography ==
Studio Albums

- Womb Star Session (Womb Star Orchestra, Cavity Search/Mazinga Records, 1995)
- Sunlit (Womb Star Orchestra, Cavity Search/Mazinga Records, 1996)
- Royal Subjects (Zig Zag soundtrack, Womb Star Orchestra, Cavity Search/Mazinga Records, 1997)
- Loves a Long Song (Starseed Transmission, Cavity Search/Mazinga Records, 2000)
- Super Beautiful Magic (The Crystal Unicorn, Cavity Search/Mazinga Records, 2017)

EPs

- Into The Sun (Starseed Transmission, Cavity Search/Mazinga Records, 1999)
- Twin Flames (The Rainbow Lodge, Cavity Search/Mazinga Records, 2017)

Singles

- "Caterpillar Blood" (Womb Star Orchestra, Ruckus, 1993)
- "Slide Away" (Cavity Search/Mazinga Records, 2007)
- "Let's Burn Those Stars" (Sacred Heart, Cavity Search/Mazinga Records, 2012)
- "Behind Blue Eyes" (Cavity Search/Mazinga Records, 2012)
- "Always Crashing in the Same Car" (Cavity Search/Mazinga Records, 2013)
- "I'm Rolling Under" (Cavity Search/Mazinga Records, 2014)
- "Sea of Unrest" (Cavity Search/Mazinga Records, 2015)

Collaborative Releases

- The Mothman Prophecies soundtrack (144,000 Piece Acid Army, Lakeshore Records, 2002)
- "Let's Burn" (Underworld: Rise of the Lycans soundtrack, Lakeshore Records, 2009)
