= EuroRhythms =

The EuroRhythms, also known as Ray Massa's EuroRhythms, are an Italian-American band from Columbus, Ohio. They generally play traditional Italian folk music, and Italian swing. The band is touring group/musical variety act, performing the United States since 1992. Their music is dubbed as old Italian popular music rewritten with a new pop sound. Their audience tends to consist of both youth looking for new Italian culture, and older Italians who appreciate the older tunes.

== History ==
In 1992 founder Ray Massa, formed a professional Italian-American band. He is the son of John and Carmela Massa, who immigrated to the US.

Since its founding, the band has consisted of 8 members. They spend their time touring Italian festivals, and performing for youth. In 2008, the band was invited to tour various cities within Italy.

== Notable performances ==
- Seattle Festa Italiana, Seattle, Washington.
- Italian Festival, Columbus, Ohio.
- Italian Day, Kennywood Park, Pittsburgh, Pennsylvania.
- Festa Italiana, Portland, Oregon.
- Festa Italiana, Virginia Beach, Virginia.
- Festa Italiana, Wisconsin.
