= The Stolen Sweets =

Jazz group from Portland, Oregon

- Origin: Portland, Oregon
- Genres: Jazz, Swing
- Years active: 2005–present
- Labels: The Stolen Sweets
- Members: Jen Bernard, Lara Michell, Erin Sutherland, Pete Krebs, David Langenes and Keith Brush
- Website: stolensweets.com

The Stolen Sweets are an American Jazz group from Portland, Oregon. Formed in 2005, the group comprises vocalists Jen Bernard, Lara Michell and Erin Sutherland, Pete Krebs and David Langenes on guitar, and Keith Brush on double bass. They have released two albums so far: Shuffle Off to Buffalo (2006) and Sleepytime in Chinatown (2009).

The band have stated that they formed with the intention of emulating 1920s–1930s vocal jazz group The Boswell Sisters. As well as detecting influences from The Boswell Sisters, reviewers have also compared the band to Cab Calloway and Django Reinhardt.

Reviews of the band have been positive. OPB's show Oregon Art Beat praised the band's "high-energy shows" and "seamless harmonies". In a review of their album Sleepytime in Chinatown, the Jazz Society of Oregon praised its "impeccable harmonies" and "retro sound".
