= The Royal Tenenbaums (soundtrack) =

2001 and 2002 soundtrack albums

The Royal Tenenbaums (Original Soundtrack)

Soundtrack album by Mark Mothersbaugh / various artists
- Released: 2001

Mark Mothersbaugh chronology
The Rugrats Movie: Music from the Motion Picture (1999)	The Royal Tenenbaums (Original Soundtrack) (2001)	Welcome to Collinwood (2003)

The Royal Tenenbaums soundtrack features a Mark Mothersbaugh score and 1960s-1990s rock songs.

The Royal Tenenbaums has had two soundtrack releases. The 2001 release omitted some songs, notably Paul Simon's "Me and Julio Down by the Schoolyard," Van Morrison's "Everyone," John Lennon's "Look at Me," the Mutato Muzika Orchestra's version of the Beatles' "Hey Jude," two tracks by the Rolling Stones ("She Smiled Sweetly" and "Ruby Tuesday"), and Erik Satie's "Gymnopédie no. 1".

In 2002, the soundtrack was re-released with three songs not found on the 2001 release, but without the two Rolling Stones songs because, although the band allows its music to be used in films, it rarely allows the songs to appear on soundtracks. The Van Morrison track, which served as the closing credits song, was also still missing. Additionally, the "Lindbergh Palace Hotel Suite," credited as original music by Mark Mothersbaugh on the 2001 release, was retitled on the 2002 soundtrack release as "Sonata for Cello and Piano in F Minor," performed by the Mutato Muzika Orchestra. The adapted sonata was originally written by the Romanian composer George Enescu (although it has been erroneously credited to the French composer Maurice Ravel; the confusion might come from the fact that the two composers were friends and attended the same composition classes).

== Releases ==
=== 2001 soundtrack release ===
==== Track listing ====
1. "111 Archer Avenue" by Mark Mothersbaugh
2. "These Days" by Nico
3. "String Quartet in F major (Second Movement)" by Maurice Ravel, performed by the Ysaÿe Quartet
4. "Lindbergh Palace Hotel Suite" by Mark Mothersbaugh
5. "Wigwam" by Bob Dylan
6. "Look at That Old Grizzly Bear" by Mark Mothersbaugh
7. "Lullabye" by Emitt Rhodes
8. "Mothersbaugh's Canon" by Mark Mothersbaugh
9. "Police & Thieves" by The Clash
10. "Scrapping and Yelling" by Mark Mothersbaugh
11. "Judy Is a Punk" by Ramones
12. "Pagoda's Theme" by Mark Mothersbaugh
13. "Needle in the Hay" by Elliott Smith
14. "Fly" by Nick Drake
15. "I Always Wanted to Be a Tenenbaum" by Mark Mothersbaugh
16. "Christmas Time Is Here" by Vince Guaraldi Trio
17. "Stephanie Says" by The Velvet Underground
18. "Rachel Evans Tenenbaum (1965-2000)" by Mark Mothersbaugh
19. "Sparkplug Minuet" by Mark Mothersbaugh
20. "The Fairest of the Seasons" by Nico

The Royal Tenenbaums

Soundtrack album
- Released: December 18, 2001
- Genres: Classical; rock; pop; folk; punk rock
- Length: 54:18
- Label: Hollywood
- Producers: Mark Mothersbaugh, Bob Casale

Professional ratings
Review scores
Source	Rating
Allmusic	link

=== 2002 soundtrack re-release ===
==== Track listing ====
1. "111 Archer Avenue" by Mark Mothersbaugh
2. "These Days" by Nico
3. "String Quartet in F major (Second Movement)" by Maurice Ravel, performed by the Ysaÿe Quartet
4. "Me and Julio Down By the Schoolyard" by Paul Simon
5. "Sonata for Cello and Piano in F Minor" by George Enescu, performed by the Mutato Muzika Orchestra
6. "Wigwam" by Bob Dylan
7. "Look at That Old Grizzly Bear" by Mark Mothersbaugh
8. "Look at Me" by John Lennon
9. "Lullaby" by Emitt Rhodes
10. "Mothersbaugh's Canon" by Mark Mothersbaugh
11. "Police & Thieves" by The Clash
12. "Scrapping and Yelling" by Mark Mothersbaugh
13. "Judy Is a Punk" by Ramones
14. "Pagoda's Theme" by Mark Mothersbaugh
15. "Needle in the Hay" by Elliott Smith
16. "Fly" by Nick Drake
17. "I Always Wanted to Be a Tenenbaum" by Mark Mothersbaugh
18. "Christmas Time Is Here" by Vince Guaraldi Trio
19. "Stephanie Says" by The Velvet Underground
20. "Rachel Evans Tenenbaum (1965-2000)" by Mark Mothersbaugh
21. "Sparkplug Minuet" by Mark Mothersbaugh
22. "The Fairest of the Seasons" by Nico
23. "Hey Jude" by the Beatles, performed by the Mutato Muzika Orchestra

The Royal Tenenbaums

Soundtrack album
- Released: July 2, 2002
- Length: 65:24
- Label: Hollywood
- Producers: Mark Mothersbaugh, Robert Casale

Professional ratings
Review scores
Source	Rating
Allmusic	link

=== 2001 Oscar promo ===
A promotional CD featuring Mothersbaugh's score for the film was released in 2001 in correspondence with the 74th Academy Awards. It was available in limited quantity.

1. "The Royal Tenenbaums"
2. "The Lindbergh"
3. "Margot Returns Home"
4. "I'm Dying"
5. "Something's Brewing"
6. "Look at That Ol' Grizzly Bear"
7. "Mothersbaugh's Canon"
8. "Raleigh and Margot"
9. "You're True Blue, Ethyl"
10. "Heavy Duty"
11. "How Can I Help"
12. "To Be a Tenenbaum"
13. "It's a Divorce"
14. "Chas Chases Eli"
15. "I Need Help"
16. "Rooftop Talk"
17. "Lindburgh"
18. "End Credits"
