= Catherine Waller =

Kiwi-American actress and TV writer

- Born: Auckland, New Zealand
- Education: Avondale College; Toi Whakaari (Bachelor of Fine Arts in Acting)

Catherine Rangi Waller is a New Zealand-American television writer and actress.

== Early life and education ==
Catherine Waller was born in Auckland, New Zealand, to Wendy Waller and John Waller, who are both Americans. Waller attended Avondale College. She graduated with a BFA in Acting at Toi Whakaari.

== Career ==
In 2014, Waller's solo work The Creeps premiered at Hollywood Fringe. In 2018, she appeared in an episode of the Netflix series Love. Waller co-wrote The Luring, a 2017 short film in which she also starred as Laura. She played the role of Krissy in Confessions of a Teenage Jesus Jerk.

== Awards ==
For her role as Amber on the New Zealand TV series, Hounds, she was nominated for the 2013 TV Guide Best On The Box Award. In the 2014 Hollywood Fringe Festival Awards, Waller won the Golden Elephant Award for The Creeps. The Creeps was also nominated for United Solo & Backstage Audience Award. Waller is also a winner of Best Physical Theatre and Best Interactive show at United Solo Festival.

== Personal life ==
In 2011, Waller and her sister Amy produced a play, Gloria, to honor the life of their grandmother, Gloria Stanford. In 2011 Waller came out as gay and in 2021, married her wife.
