= Hazel (band) =

American alternative rock band

- Origin: Portland, Oregon, United States
- Genres: Grunge, alternative rock, power pop
- Years active: 1992–1997
- Labels: Sub Pop, Cavity Search Records, Candy-Ass/Caroline
- Past members: Jody Bleyle; Pete Krebs; Brady Smith; Fred Nemo

Hazel was an American alternative rock band based in Portland, Oregon. The band was a quartet, consisting of Jody Bleyle (drums and vocals), Pete Krebs (guitar and vocals), Brady Smith (bass), and Fred Nemo (dancer). It lasted from 1992 to 1997.

== History ==
=== Formation, style ===
The group was formed on February 14, 1992. Although based in the Pacific Northwest and active during the grunge movement in rock music, Hazel's music was different from most grunge in that it featured both male and female vocals, as well as a more melodic sound that could be described as noise pop. Hazel's music was not particularly intricate musically, relying on a few chords, sheer energy (many songs being played at breakneck speed), and vocal intensity. Rather than singing together in harmony, Krebs and Bleyle often sang completely different parts that answered or intertwined with one another. The majority of lyrics dealt with problems regarding relationships, including the regret and resentment following a breakup ("Everybody's Best Friend") or the anxiety felt while attempting to begin a relationship ("Day-Glo").

The group was also notable for featuring the dancer Fred Nemo as a full member. Often dressed in fanciful costumes, Nemo, a tall, bearded man, cavorted crazily about the stage, climbing atop speaker cabinets and swinging heavy objects through the air.

=== Albums ===
Cavity Search Records was founded as a small, independent record label in Portland, Oregon in 1992. Later in 1992, Hazel's "J. Hell" b/w "Day-Glo"/"Joe Louis Punchout" was the first single the label released.

The group released two full-length albums in 1993 and 1995, Toreador of Love and Are You Going to Eat That respectively on the Sub Pop label. The latter received critical attention with overall mixed reviews. The Record praised the band's "outstanding vocal harmonies," but AllMusic was less positive, claiming the album was "a long haul, despite only being 35 minutes." A five-song EP on Candy-Ass/Caroline, Airiana, was their last release in 1997. Each of the band's members became focused on their own endeavors, such as record labels and solo careers. While never formally breaking up, the band was fully dissolved by early 1997. They generally have played a couple of shows a year since then.

=== Post-dissolution ===
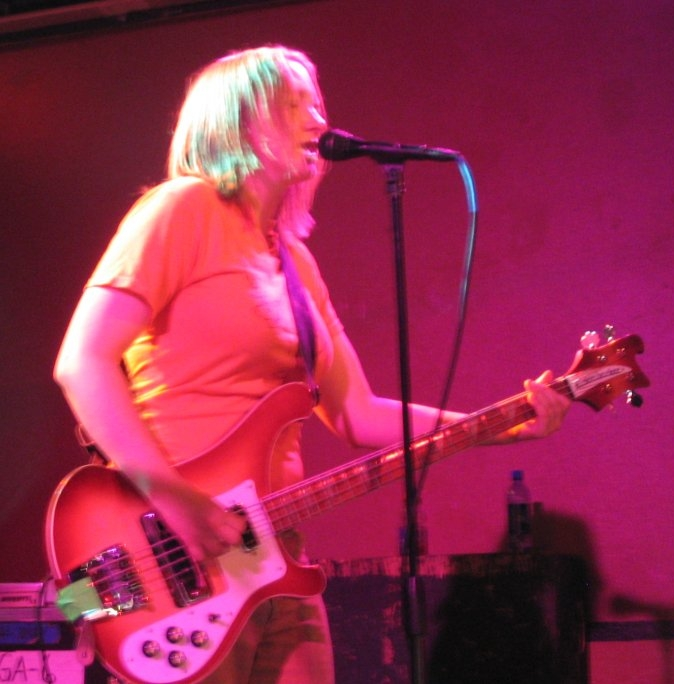
Jody Bleyle in 2005

As of 2005, Nemo performs with Tara Jane O'Neil and works as a bicycle activist in Portland. Krebs, also living in Portland, teaches guitar and performs with a wide assortment of ensembles. Bleyle, now based in Los Angeles, continues to perform around the United States, including reunion shows with punk band Team Dresch; Family Outing, a duo with her brother Allen; touring with Amy Ray of the Indigo Girls; and singing jazz standards in L.A. dives. Smith was the founding principal of Validus Preparatory Academy, a public high school in The Bronx, New York. He was the principal of Beacon High School in New York City from 2020 until 2023.

In 2013, Hazel was named in the Oregon Music Hall of Fame.

== Members ==
- Jody Bleyle (drums and vocals)
- Pete Krebs (guitar and vocals)
- Brady Smith (bass)
- Fred Nemo (dancer)

== Discography ==
=== Studio albums ===
- Toreador of Love (Sub Pop, 1993)
- Are You Going to Eat That (Sub Pop, 1995)

=== Other albums ===
- Lucky Dog (Sub Pop, 1993) (Promo album, commercially released as Toreador of Love)
- Live in Portland (Voodoo Doughnut Recordings/Cavity Search Records, 2016) (Live album of two concerts recorded in 1993)

=== Singles and EPs ===
- "Heida" b/w "Pop Uncle" (Candy-Ass Records, 1992)
- "J. Hell" b/w "Day-Glo"/"Joe Louis Punchout" (Cavity Search Records, 1992)
- "Day-Glo" b/w "Constipation" (Sub Pop, 1993) (Promo single)
- "Jilted" b/w "Truly" (Sub Pop, 1993) (also released as a 12" single by Sub Pop in 1993 in Germany, with "Jilted"/"Truly" on the A side and "Gilly's Legs"/"Constipation" on the B side)
- "Blank Florida" b/w "Motor Sport Daredevils" (Pacific Wonderland Records, 1994)
- "Wintogreen" b/w "King Twist" (Cavity Search Records, 1994)
- Airiana EP (Candy-Ass Records, 1997)
- "Romeo" b/w "Incendiary" (Candy-Ass Records, 1997) (Split single with Ovarian Trolley)
