= Look at Me (John Lennon song) =

1970 song by John Lennon

- Cover of the 2021 remix

Song by John Lennon

from the album John Lennon/Plastic Ono Band
- Released: 11 December 1970
- Recorded: 26 September – 23 October 1970
- Genre: Folk
- Length: 2:54
- Label: Apple Records
- Songwriter: John Lennon
- Producers: John Lennon; Yoko Ono; Phil Spector

"Look at Me" is a song written and performed by John Lennon, from his debut solo album John Lennon/Plastic Ono Band.

== Writing ==
John Lennon began writing "Look at Me" in India in 1968, during the extended sessions for The Beatles' self-titled double album, also known as "The White Album". He then shelved the song until 1970, when he recorded it for his debut solo album John Lennon/Plastic Ono Band. A different recording of the song was later released on the John Lennon Anthology and the compilation album Acoustic.

The pattern of the song is fairly prominent throughout the track. It was built from a finger-picking technique that Lennon used on The Beatles songs such as "Dear Prudence", "Happiness Is a Warm Gun" and "Julia", all of which appear on The White Album. Lennon learned this finger-picking guitar style (known as Travis-picking) from the Scottish musician Donovan, who was with The Beatles at the time at Rishikesh, India.

== Recording ==
Recorded at EMI Studios on 7 October 1970, the album version of "Look at Me" features double-tracked vocals by Lennon.

== Personnel ==
- John Lennon – vocals, acoustic guitar

== In popular culture ==
- The version from the John Lennon Anthology was featured in the 2001 film The Royal Tenenbaums and its soundtrack.
- The Canadian punk rock band Sum 41 released a song titled "Look at Me" from their LP Underclass Hero. The beginning verse also started with the lines "Look at me; who am I supposed to be?" The album title itself is a reference to another Lennon song, "Working Class Hero".
- Joseph Arthur recorded a version for the Lennon Covered #2 CD issued by Q magazine.
- Orenda Fink covered "Look at Me" as an extra-song on the download-only single "Ace Of Cups" (2014)
