= Travis Shallow =

American singer-songwriter

Travis Leigh Shallow
- Born: July 31, 1984 (age 41); Greenville, North Carolina, United States
- Origin: Wilmington, North Carolina, United States
- Genres: Americana; folk; Rock; alternative country
- Occupations: Singer-Songwriter; Musician; Producer
- Instruments: Vocals; guitar; piano; mandolin
- Years active: 2002–present
- Labels: Cavity Search Records; Pearly Girl Records
- Formerly of: A Few Good Liars
- Website: travisshallow.com

Travis Shallow (born Travis Leigh Shallow; July 31, 1984) is an American singer-songwriter.

== Biography ==
Shallow debuted "Let It Pass" on his livestream series "Live from Shallow Chateau" that he created during quarantine in response to all live shows being cancelled due to the pandemic. He has live-streamed over 125 episodes during quarantine since March 2020. The "Live from Shallow Chateau" livestream series was also broadcast on JamBase as one of their weekly Featured Livestreams.

Shallow also live-streamed on Breedlove Guitars social media during November 2020 as Shallow followed Jeff Bridges as their Featured Artist of the month. Shallow initially became an endorsed artist with Breedlove Guitars in January 2019.

Shallow was a former member of alternative country band A Few Good Liars, with whom he recorded one studio album in 2011 titled, Battered Wooden Body. "Battered Wooden Body" was recorded in Oxford, Mississippi at Tweed Recording Studi' and was engineered by Andrew Ratcliffe.

In 2012, Shallow left A Few Good Liars and started writing and recording songs that would later be released as his first solo self-titled album, Travis Shallow.

Shallow went back to Tweed Recording Studio with Ratcliffe engineering to record his solo debut album. This solo album was acoustically driven with an accompanying band to highlight the songwriting and lyrical prowess.

After the release of his self-titled album in March 2016, Shallow took the show to the people performing intimate shows, stripped down with him and an acoustic guitar. Shallow also landed himself some national opening spots after releasing his debut solo album with Gregg Allman from The Allman Brothers, Tedeschi Trucks Band, Lukas Nelson & Promise of the Real (son of legend Willie Nelson), The Marcus King Band, Jerry Joseph, Todd Snider, and fellow native North Carolina band, American Aquarium.

Shallow continued writing and began fronting a new line-up, Travis Shallow & The Deep End, with a studio album titled, The Great Divide, released on October 31, 2017. This 8-song album is a mix of Americana, soul, and rock and roll, recorded analog to two-inch tape at Overdub Lane in Durham, North Carolina with Jason Merritt engineering.

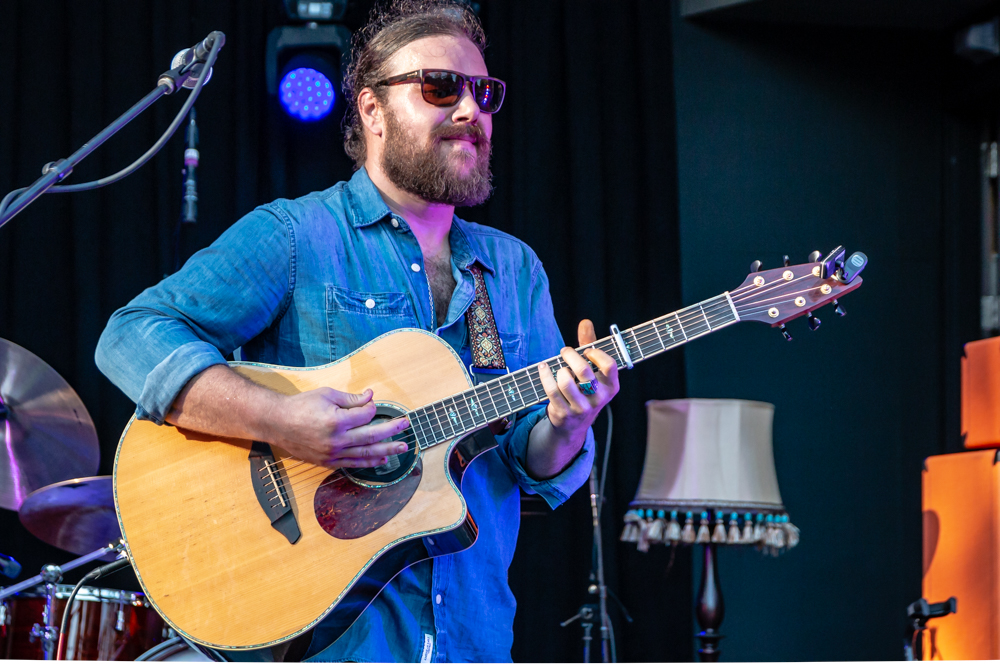
Shallow at Greenfield Lake Amphitheater

The Great Divide was featured in Relix Magazine upon release.

== Members ==
Travis Shallow & The Deep End

- Travis Shallow – vocals, guitar
- Bob Russell – guitar
- Jason Moore – bass
- Brian Mason – drums

== Songs in TV/Film ==
- 9-1-1 (TV series) Season 6 Ep. No. 12 (2023) "I Can See Clearly Now"
- The Last Mark (2022) "Blood Brothers"
- The Hermit (2013) "Shadows"

== Discography ==
- Hard Time with the Truth (2023, Pearly Girl Records)
- Let It Pass (2020, Cavity Search Records)
- The Great Divide (2017, Pearly Girl Records)
- Travis Shallow (2016, Pearly Girl Records)
- Battered Wooden Body (2011)
