= Confessions of a Teenage Jesus Jerk =

2017 film directed by Eric Stoltz

- Directed by: Eric Stoltz
- Written by: Tony DuShane
- Based on: Confessions of a Teenage Jesus Jerk by Tony DuShane
- Produced by: Kenny Hughes
- Starring: Sasha Feldman; Nicholas Harsin; Paul Adelstein; Lauren Lakis
- Release date: 2017
- Running time: 96 minutes
- Country: United States
- Language: English

Confessions of a Teenage Jesus Jerk is a 2017 film directed by Eric Stoltz, produced by Kenny Hughes and written by Tony DuShane, with the screenplay based on his own novel.

Set in the mid-1980s in California, it is about a young Jehovah's Witness and his doubts and sexual experiences, or lack thereof, over the course of about a year. Scenes within the Jehovah's Witnesses community and families are contrasted to "worldly" settings, often symbolized by presence of globes. Short interviews, appearing to be interviews with real Jehovah's Witnesses, are interspersed in. One interviewee was played by David Hedison (1927–2019), in his final film role.

== Cast ==
- Sasha Feldman as Gabe
- Paul Adelstein as Allen, Gabe's father
- Charlie Buhler as Jasmine
- Kelsey Lewis as Ally
- Lauren Lakis as Karen, Gabe's cousin
- Kit DeZolt as Kien
- Rob Giles as Uncle Jeff
- Nicholas Harsin as Peter
- Tara Summers as Linn, Gabe's aunt
- David Hedison as Interviewee #2
- James Karen
- Bevin Hamilton
- Shari Belafonte as Flo, a librarian
- Catherine Waller as Krissy
- Tegan West as Brother Knox
