= No Confidence Man =

"Shytown"/"No Confidence Man"

Single by Elliott Smith and Pete Krebs
- A-side: "Shytown"
- B-side: "No Confidence Man"
- Released: 1994
- Recorded: August 14, 1994
- Genre: Indie folk
- Label: Slo-Mo
- Songwriters: Pete Krebs; Elliott Smith
- Producer: Elliott Smith

Elliott Smith singles chronology
"No Confidence Man" / "Shytown" (1994)	"Needle in the Hay" (1995)

"No Confidence Man" is a song by American singer-songwriter Elliott Smith. It was originally released in 1994 by record label Slo-Mo as the B-side to a split 7-inch vinyl single with Pete Krebs, with Krebs' track "Shytown" making the A-side, making it his first solo single.

== Recording ==
"No Confidence Man" was recorded in one day, on August 14, 1994. Engineering was handled by Smith.

== Content ==
The lyrics refer to a character named "Charlie", who has been referenced in at least one other of Smith's songs, and is a possible reference to Smith's stepfather Charlie Welch.

== Release ==
The single was originally released in 1994 by record label Slo-Mo.

It was re-issued in digital format in 2014 by UseMusic.org, with proceeds going to Outside/In, a not-for-profit Portland, Oregon organisation that works with homeless youth. The tracks were remixed by producer and Elliott Smith archivist Larry Crane: "I remixed these recently from excellent transfers of the original 1/4-inch, 8-track master tapes, so the audio is quite a bit better than old transfers pulled off vinyl".

== Track listing ==
Side A

1. Pete Krebs – "Shytown"

Side B

1. Elliott Smith – "No Confidence Man"
