= Are You Going to Eat That =

Studio album by Hazel
- Released: 1995
- Genre: Indie pop, indie rock
- Length: 36:30
- Label: Sub Pop
- Producer: Donna Dresch, Hazel

Hazel chronology
Toreador of Love (1993)	Are You Going to Eat That (1995)	Ariana EP (1997)

Are You Going to Eat That is an album by the American band Hazel, released in 1995. The band supported the album by touring with Veruca Salt. "Blank Florida" was released as a single.

== Production ==
The album was produced by Donna Dresch and Hazel. Most of the songs are about relationships and gender identity. Fred Remo is credited as the band's "dancer".

== Critical reception ==
Professional ratings
Review scores
Source	Rating
AllMusic	3/5 stars
Chicago Tribune	3/4 stars
MusicHound Rock: The Essential Album Guide	3/5 stars
The Tampa Tribune	2/4 stars

Trouser Press thought that "Hazel’s pop penchant has been de-emphasized in favor of the miasma of indie rock." CMJ New Music Monthly praised the band's ability to "write mid-tempo songs that aren't dirgey or mopey or whiny." The Record wrote that "Hazel is blessed by the outstanding vocal harmonies of guitarist Peter Krebs and drummer Jody Bleyle, which invite comparisons to John Doe and Exene Cervenka of the pioneering punk band X."

The Stranger called the songs "impeccable pop, girded spiritually and sonically by punk and what used to be called college rock, and set alight by the vocal interplay of guitarist Pete Krebs and drummer Jody Bleyle." The Tampa Tribune deemed the album "pleasant but inconsequential alterna-pop." The Seattle Post-Intelligencer praised the "catchy vocal harmonies" and "dynamic rhythm section."

AllMusic wrote that "with nothing but the boy-girl vocals to carry the record, it becomes a long haul, despite only being 35 minutes."

== Track listing ==
All tracks are written by Donna Dresch, Hazel, Mike Lastra

No.	Title	Length
1.	"Lazy H."	1:52
2.	"Green Eyes"	2:36
3.	"King Twist"	2:45
4.	"Ascension"	2:50
5.	"Quick Jerk"	3:04
6.	"Sparkle Finish"	2:41
7.	"Blank Florida"	2:51
8.	"A Perfect Pot"	4:07
9.	"Chasing After James"	2:18
10.	"Crowned"	3:02
11.	"I'm Shattered Again"	2:14
12.	"Calliope"	2:55
13.	"Ringing in My Ears"	3:10
Total length:		36:30
