= Pete Krebs =

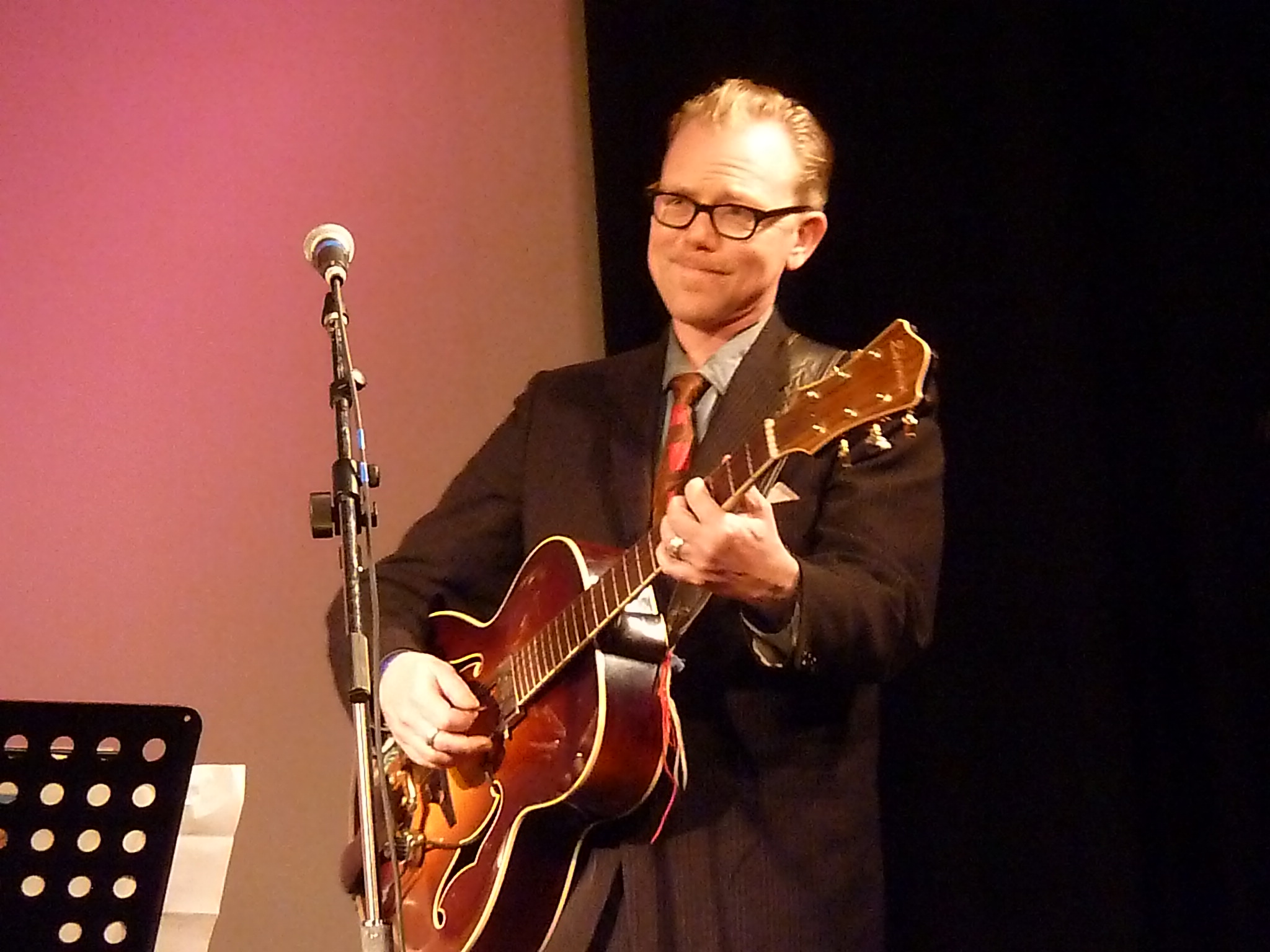
- Pete Krebs at the Redwood Coast Jazz Festival, 2011

Background information
- Origin: Portland, Oregon, United States
- Genres: Punk-pop, bluegrass, gypsy swing, singer-songwriter, western swing
- Occupation: Musician
- Label: Cavity Search Records
- Formerly of: Hazel, Golden Delicious, Pearl Django, The Stolen Sweets, Pete Krebs and his Portland Playboys, The Catnip Brothers, Pete Krebs and The Gossamer Wings

Pete Krebs is an American musician from Portland, Oregon, best known as a member of the punk-pop band Hazel, and for No Confidence Man, a split single with Elliott Smith.

== Career ==
Krebs was a member of punk bands Hair Bed Peace, Thrillhammer and Hazel, bluegrass band Golden Delicious, gypsy swing band Pearl Django and later recorded solo as a singer-songwriter.

Krebs debuted as a solo musician in 1995 on Cavity Search Records with the acoustic Brigadier. Krebs has performed in Golden Delicious, The Stolen Sweets, Pete Krebs and his Portland Playboys, The Catnip Brothers and Pete Krebs and The Gossamer Wings.

In 1997, Krebs released Western Electric.

Sweet Ona Rose, released in 1999, included former Soundgarden member Ben Shepherd on bass.

Krebs collaborated with other Portland Gypsy-jazz enthusiasts on the album Hot Ginger and Dynamite in 2001. He also teamed up with Bad Livers singer and banjo virtuoso Danny Barnes for Duet For Clarinet and Goat (Cavity Search) in which the musicians covered each other's songs.

Krebs' I Know It By Heart was released on Cavity Search in 2003.

Krebs played with The Stolen Sweets from 2004 to 2014. The Sweets play music modeled after that of the Boswell Sisters, a 1930s group.

Krebs was inducted into the Oregon Music Hall of Fame in 2013 along with his bandmates from Hazel. Krebs also fronts the western swing outfit Pete Krebs & the Portland Playboys.
