= Lauren Lakis =

American film/stage actor, singer, and multi-instrumentalist (born 1990)

- Born: November 22, 1990 (age 35); Baltimore, Maryland, U.S.
- Education: Goucher College (BA)

Lauren Lakis (born November 22, 1990) is an American film and stage actor, singer, and multi-instrumentalist.

== Early life and education ==
Lakis is a native of Baltimore. She became interested in acting while attending Goucher College, where she earned a bachelor's degree in photography. Lakis lived in Los Angeles for 10 years before relocating to Austin, Texas.

== Career ==
Lakis played the role of Karen in Confessions of a Teenage Jesus Jerk (2017). In 2020, Chloe Robinson of Earmilk praised Lakis for "distinct tones and profoundly honest songwriting" and noted that Lakis is "known for her stunningly organic compositions which create an ethereal and dreamy atmosphere."

In 2021, her album Daughter Language was released.

== Filmography ==
=== Film ===
Year	Title	Role	Notes
2011	Jebediah	Elizabeth	
2011	Lovely Molly	Female Friend 2	
2011	Witch's Brew	Piper	
2011	The Blinds	Juliet	
2011	Garden of Hedon	Liz	
2012	Horror House	Helen – Age 16	
2013	House with 100 Eyes	Maddie	
2013	American Girls	Movie Cindy	
2014	Gun Woman	Abducted Woman	
2015	Hybrids	Maria	
2015	The Grayhaven Maniac	Lauren	
2015	Fun Size Horror: Volume One	Jogger	
2015	Appleton	Colleen	
2015	Rows	Greta	
2015	Other Halves	Devon	
2017	Confessions of a Teenage Jesus Jerk	Karen	
2018	All the Creatures Were Stirring	Ticket Seller	
2019	Cinderela Pop	Helena Dorella	
2020	I'll Be Around	Allison	
2021	Friendzone	Alexandra	
2022	The Taming of the Shrewd	Jagoda	
2022	Showing Up	Terri	
TBA	Double Kill	Paislee Parks / Janelle Jameson	
TBA	Nobody Wants to Be Just Ordinary	Kate	

=== Television ===
Year	Title	Role	Notes
2010	Lost Trailer Park: Never Coming Attractions	Final Girl	Episode: "Liburied"
2010	Zombies March	Slumber Party Girl 1	Television film
2014	Kroll Show	Kissing Girl 1	Episode: "Finger Magnets"
2014	Loiter Squad	Laura	Episode: "Bronco Buster"
2014	Dating Pains	Zoe	Episode: "The Jig Is Up!"
2014	Murder Book	1979 Victim	Episode: "The Long Walk Home"
2015	Dr. Ken	Wasted Woman	Episode: "Pilot"
2016	Rosewood	Clara Reesner	Episode: "Wooberite & the Women of Rosewood"
2018	Vengeful	Christie Tyler	Episode: "Pilot"
2018	Homecoming	Young Couple	Episode: "Optics"
2019	Twice Upon a Time	Louise Arron	4 episodes
2019	Big Little Lies	Yvonne	Episode: "The End of the World"
2020	That One Time	Jenny	Episode: "Pilot"
2021	Until Life Do Us Part	Rita	8 episodes
2021	The Sex Lives of College Girls	Bethany	Episode: "Le Tuteur"
