= Golden Delicious (band) =

Band from Portland, Oregon, U.S.

- Origin: Portland, OR
- Genres: Country music, bluegrass music
- Years active: 1990s
- Label: Cavity Search Records
- Past members: Pete Krebs, Kevin Richey, Paul Bassett, Marilee Hord, Jesse Spero, David Reisch

Golden Delicious were a Portland, Oregon-based band active in the mid- and late-1990s. Their members included, at various times, Pete Krebs (guitar), Kevin Richey (banjo), Paul Bassett (washboard), Marilee Hord (fiddle), Jesse Spero (drums), and David Reisch (bass). Their music has been described as country, bluegrass, and having "a punk rock energy and a slightly irreverent attitude." David Goodman wrote in Modern Twang that the band "combines the spirited new old-time style of groups like the Highwoods String Band or the Freight Hoppers with the madcap attitude of the Holy Modal Rounders." Hord told No Depression that the band did not like when they were labeled as a specific genre like "alt-country", saying, "When you categorize music, you degrade it." The band released their debut album, Old School, on Cavity Search Records in 1997.

== Discography ==
- Old School (Cavity Search, 1997)
- Cavity Search (Cavity Search, 1998)
- Live at the Laurelthirst (Cavity Search, 1999)
