= Pearl Django =

American jazz group

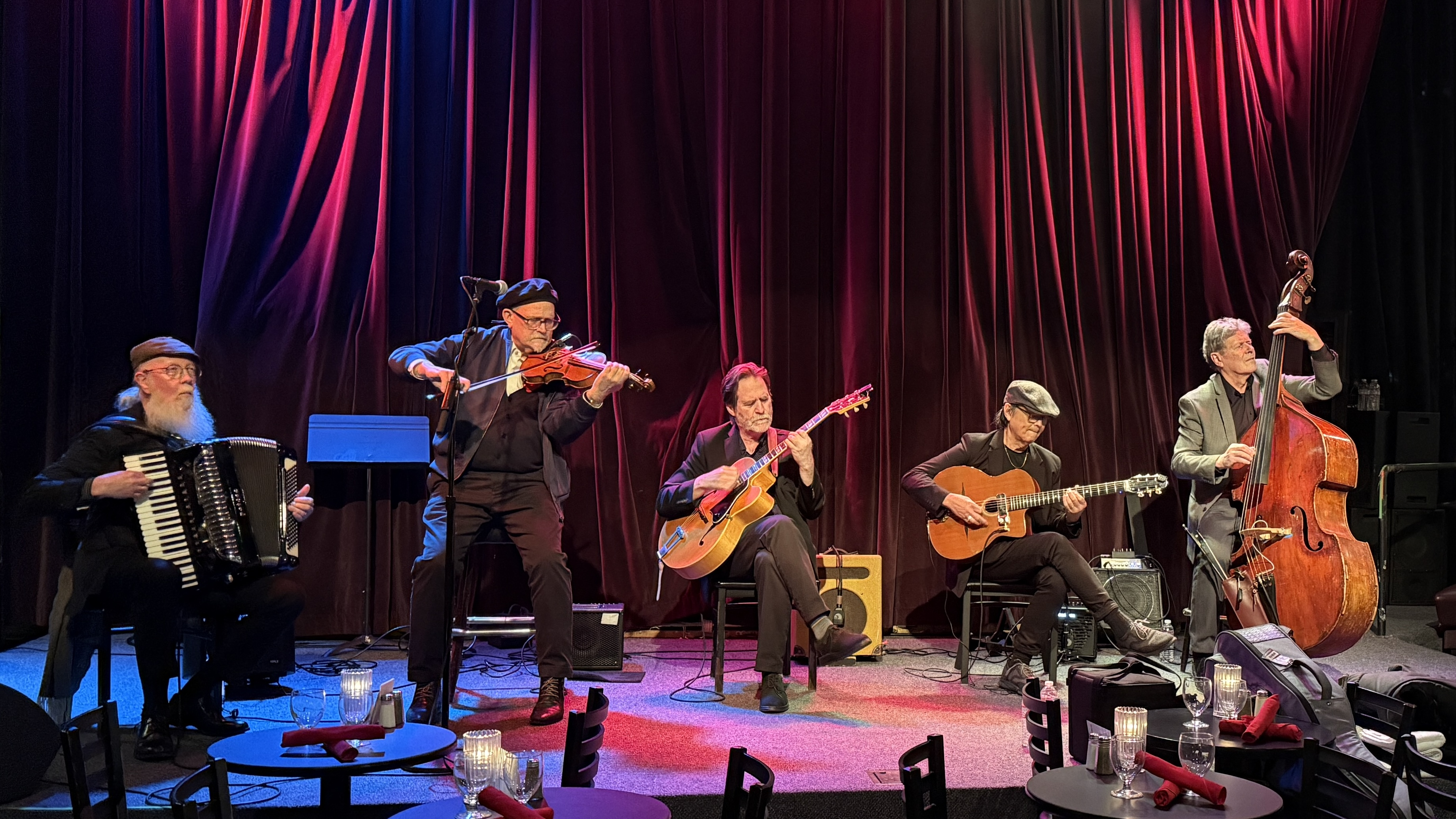
- Pearl Django at Jazz Alley in 2025. From left to right: David Lange, Michael Gray, Tim Lerch, Jim Char and Rick Leppanen

Background information
- Origin: Tacoma, Washington, U.S.
- Genres: Gypsy swing; swing revival
- Years active: 1994–present
- Label: Modern Hot Records
- Members: Tim Lerch; Michael Gray; Rick Leppanen; David Lange; Jim Char
- Past members: Neil Andersson; Troy Chapman; Ron Peters; Greg Ruby; Pete Krebs; Dudley Hill; Shelley D. Park; David Firman; Ryan Hoffman
- Website: pearldjango.com

Pearl Django is an American jazz group established in 1994 in Tacoma, Washington by guitarists Neil Andersson and Dudley Hill and bassist David "Pope" Firman. The group melds the music of Django Reinhardt and Stephane Grappelli with American Swing. Initially a trio, they have changed and added members over the years and are now a quintet. Based in Seattle, they have played around the United States, as well as in France and Iceland.

The band has performed at the prestigious Festival Django Reinhardt in Samois-sur-Seine and at Juan de Fuca Festival. They have played with Martin Taylor, Bucky Pizzarelli, and Gail Pettis, a two-time recipient of the Earshot Jazz 'Jazz Vocalist Of The Year' award. The British virtuoso Taylor turns up on three tracks of their 2011 album Eleven. On their twelfth album, Time Flies, released in 2015, all tracks are their own compositions except for one classic bossa nova.

== Discography ==
Released	Title	Label	Notes
1995	Le Jazz Hot	Modern Hot Records	
1997	New Metropolitan Swing	Modern Hot Records	
1999	Mystery Pacific	Modern Hot Records	
1999	Souvenirs	Modern Hot Records	
2000	Avalon	Modern Hot Records	
2002	Under Paris Skies	Modern Hot Records	
2003	Swing 48	Modern Hot Records	
2005	Chasing Shadows	Modern Hot Records	
2007	Modern Times	Modern Hot Records	
2010	Hotel New Yorker	Modern Hot Records	Compilation from 1995 to 1999 releases
2010	Système D	Modern Hot Records	
2012	Eleven	Modern Hot Records	
2015	Time Flies	Modern Hot Records	
2017	With Friends Like These	Modern Hot Records	All original compositions
2019	Pearl Django Live	Modern Hot Records	
2020	Simplicity	Modern Hot Records	All original compositions
2026	Tableau	Modern Hot Records	All original compositions
