= Julian Tepper =

American writer and musician (born 1979)

- Born: April 1, 1979 (age 47); Manhattan, New York, NY
- Occupation: Writer
- Children: 2
- Writing career
- Period: 2012–present
- Genre: Fiction
- Notable works: Balls; Ark; Between the Records; Cooler Heads

Julian Tepper (born April 1, 1979) is an American novelist and essayist. He has written four novels: Balls (2012), Ark (2016), Between the Records (2020), and Cooler Heads (2024). His writing has appeared in The Paris Review, Playboy, The Brooklyn Rail, Tablet, and elsewhere. His essay "Locking Down with the Family You've Just Eviscerated in a Novel" for Zyzzyva was named a notable essay of 2021 in The Best American Essays 2022. He is the co-founder, alongside artist Jenna Gribbon, of the Oracle Club, a literary salon in New York City that operated from 2011 to 2017. As a member of the indie rock band The Natural History, he co-wrote the Spoon hit "Don't You Evah".

== Early life ==
Tepper was born in New York City and raised on Manhattan's Upper East Side. His father, Robert Tepper, is a musician best known for writing the 1980 ballad "Into the Night" and for writing and recording "No Easy Way Out", which appeared in the 1985 film Rocky IV.

== Career ==
=== Novels ===
Tepper's debut novel, Balls, was published in 2012. The book is a dark comedy about Henry Schiller, a 30-year-old piano player and neurotic Jew who lives in Manhattan with his younger, more musically gifted girlfriend Paula. When Henry discovers that he has testicular cancer, it prompts an existential crisis. The book has been praised for capturing the feel of New York City. Tepper started writing it in New Orleans and continued it in Finland, but stated that the book didn't start to take form until he returned to New York. Tepper has said Balls was influenced by Saul Bellow's 1964 novel Herzog, as well as the work of Fyodor Dostoyevsky, Franz Kafka and Woody Allen.

Tepper's second novel, Ark, was published in 2016. Set in Manhattan, it follows three generations of the formerly wealthy, artistic, infighting Arkin family. Some of the characters were based on Tepper's real-life family members. The New York Times wrote, "Despite some early stumbles, 'Ark' is an engaging and entertaining novel, and an insightful take on just how easy it can be to slip from the upper class."

Tepper wrote an autobiographical novel, Between the Records, based on his own, as well as his family's, life in music. An excerpt appeared in the May/June 2018 Issue of Playboy magazine. It was published in 2020.

Tepper's fourth novel, Cooler Heads, was published in 2024. Set mostly in New York City, it is about the relationship between Paul, a newsletter writer, and Celia, a gifted painter. Publishers Weekly called Cooler Heads "devastating" and added that "offering a pitiless dissection of a modern relationship, Tepper shows himself an expert at orchestrating scenes of domestic carnage. This plays out like a hipster Brooklyn version of Richard Yates's Revolutionary Road."

=== The Oracle Club ===
Tepper and artist Jenna Gribbon founded The Oracle Club in 2011, a members-only literary salon and workspace for artists and writers in Long Island City, Queens, which closed in 2017.

=== Music ===
Tepper played bass in The Natural History, an indie rock trio formed in New York in 2001, with his brother Max Tepper on lead vocals and guitar. He co-wrote their song "Don’t You Ever", which was covered by Spoon as "Don't You Evah" on their 2007 album Ga Ga Ga Ga Ga, and was also released as a single/EP on April 8, 2008. The original version by The Natural History was included on the 8-song EP, alongside remixes of the Spoon version by Ted Leo, Diplo and Matthew Dear. Spoon included "Don't You Evah" on Everything Hits at Once: The Best of Spoon, released by Matador Records in July 2019. An article Tepper wrote for Playboy magazine includes a Q & A with Spoon's Britt Daniel, in which the Tepper brothers and Daniel recount the story behind "Don't You Evah".

The Natural History released an EP and two full-length albums and disbanded in 2005.

== Bibliography ==
=== Books ===
- Balls (Rare Bird Books, 2012)
- Ark (Dzanc Books, 2016)
- Between the Records (Rare Bird Books, 2020)
- Cooler Heads (Rare Bird Books, 2024)

=== Essays ===
- "Dr. Collier," The Paris Review, August 1, 2012
- "In Which Philip Roth Gave Me Life Advice," The Paris Review, December 25, 2012
- "The Strange Story Behind Spoon's "Don't You Evah"—and the Overlooked Band That Wrote It," Playboy, August 1, 2019
- "Locking Down with the Family You've Just Eviscerated in a Novel," Zyzzyva, March 9, 2021
- "The Waiter," Tablet, May 7, 2023

== Discography ==
- The Natural History (EP on Startime International, 2002)
- Beat Beat Heartbeat (LP on Startime International, 2003)
- People That I Meet (LP on Beat Beat Beat, 2007)

== Filmography ==
- Extremely Loud & Incredibly Close (as Deli Waiter, dir. Stephen Daldry, 2011)
- Gossip Girl (as himself, "Salon of the Dead", season 5, episode 20, April 16, 2012)
