= Dorothy Canning Miller =

American curator

Dorothy Canning Miller

Dorothy Canning Miller (February 6, 1904 – July 11, 2003) was an American art curator and one of the most influential people in American modern art for more than half of the 20th century. The first professionally trained curator at the Museum of Modern Art (MoMA), she was one of the very few women in her time who held a museum position of such responsibility.

== Early life and education ==
Miller, the daughter of Arthur Barrett Miller and Edith Almena Canning, was born in Hopedale, Massachusetts and grew up in Montclair, New Jersey. After graduating from Smith College in 1925, she trained with John Cotton Dana of the Newark Museum, which was then one of the most creative and ambitious museums in the country, and worked there from 1926 to 1929. From 1930 to 1932, she worked for Mrs. Henry Lang cataloging and researching a collection of Native American art which was to be donated to the Montclair Art Museum.

== Career at MoMA ==
The Museum of Modern Art, founded in 1929, did not yet have its own building in the early 1930s and was housed in a series of temporary quarters. Miller first came to director Alfred H. Barr, Jr.'s attention in 1933, when she and Holger Cahill (with whom Miller was living in Greenwich Village — they married in 1938) were curating the First Municipal Art Exhibition in space donated by the Rockefeller family. Some of the participating artists wanted to boycott the show after the Diego Rivera mural Man at the Crossroads was deliberately destroyed during the construction of Rockefeller Center. Miller asked Barr to intercede in the controversy, which he did.

Not long after that she put on her "best summer hat" and went to the Museum to ask him for a job. Barr hired her as his assistant curator in 1934 and over the years she progressed through the ranks, becoming Barr's most trusted collaborator and, by 1947, curator of the museum collections.

In 1959, Miller was appointed to the art committee for One Chase Manhattan Plaza, serving with Gordon Bunshaft (chief designer for Skidmore, Owings and Merrill), Robert Hale (curator of American painting at the Metropolitan Museum of Art), James Johnson Sweeney (director of the Solomon R. Guggenheim Museum), Perry Rathbone (director of the Museum of Fine Arts, Boston), and Alfred H. Barr, Jr.

In 1968, she was appointed to a commission to choose modern art works for the Governor Nelson A. Rockefeller Empire State Plaza Art Collection in Albany, NY.

After her retirement from MoMA in 1969, Miller became a trustee and art advisor for Rockefeller University, the Port Authority of New York and New Jersey, and the Hirshhorn Museum and Sculpture Garden. She was an honorary trustee of MoMA from 1984 until her death in 2003 at age 99.

== The Americans shows ==
From the early 1940s through the early 1960s, Miller organised six contemporary Americans shows which introduced a total of ninety artists to the American museum public. In contrast to the usual large group shows, in which hundreds of artists are represented by one work each, Miller devised a format in which larger selections of works by a smaller number of artists were represented in individual galleries. She famously said, "What you try to achieve are climaxes—introduction, surprise, going around the corner and seeing something unexpected, perhaps several climaxes with very dramatic things, then a quiet tapering off with something to let you out alive."

=== Americans 1942: 18 Artists From 9 States ===
- Darrell Austin
- Hyman Bloom
- Raymond Breinin
- Samuel Cashwan
- Francis Chapin
- Emma Lu Davis
- Morris Graves
- Joseph Hirsch
- Donal Hord
- Charles Howard
- Rico Lebrun
- Jack Levine
- Helen Lundeberg
- Fletcher Martin
- Octavio Medellin
- Knud Merrild
- Mitchell Siporin
- Everett Spruce

=== 1946: Fourteen Americans ===
- David Aronson
- Ben Culwell
- Arshile Gorky
- David Hare
- Loren MacIver
- Robert Motherwell
- Isamu Noguchi
- I. Rice Pereira
- Alton Pickens
- C. S. Price
- Theodore Roszak
- Honoré Desmond Sharrer
- Saul Steinberg
- Mark Tobey

=== 1952: Fifteen Americans ===
- William Baziotes
- Edward Corbett
- Edwin Dickinson
- Herbert Ferber
- Joseph Glasco
- Herbert Katzman
- Frederick Kiesler
- Irving Kriesberg
- Richard Lippold
- Jackson Pollock
- Herman Rose
- Mark Rothko
- Clyfford Still
- Bradley Tomlin
- Thomas Wilfred

=== 1956: Twelve Americans ===
- Ernest Briggs
- James Brooks
- Sam Francis
- Fritz Glarner
- Philip Guston
- Raoul Hague
- Grace Hartigan
- Franz Kline
- Ibram Lassaw
- Seymour Lipton
- Jose de Rivera
- Larry Rivers

=== 1959: Sixteen Americans ===
- Jay DeFeo
- Wally Hedrick
- James Jarvaise
- Jasper Johns
- Ellsworth Kelly
- Alfred Leslie
- Landes Lewitin
- Richard Lytle
- Robert Mallary
- Louise Nevelson
- Robert Rauschenberg
- Julius Schmidt
- Richard Stankiewicz
- Frank Stella
- Albert Urban
- Jack Youngerman

=== Americans 1963 ===
- Richard Anuszkiewicz
- Lee Bontecou
- Chryssa
- Sally Drummond
- Edward Higgins
- Robert Indiana
- Gabriel Kohn
- Michael Lekakis
- Richard Lindner
- Marisol
- Claes Oldenburg
- Ad Reinhardt
- James Rosenquist
- Jason Seley
- David Simpson

== The New American Painting ==
On an international scale, Miller's most influential show was The New American Painting, which toured eight European countries in 1958 and 1959. This exhibition significantly changed European perceptions of American art, firmly establishing the importance of contemporary American painting, particularly the American abstract expressionists, for an international audience.

The New American Painting tour showcased eighty-one paintings by seventeen artists:

- William Baziotes
- James Brooks
- Sam Francis
- Arshile Gorky
- Adolph Gottlieb
- Philip Guston
- Grace Hartigan
- Franz Kline
- Willem de Kooning
- Robert Motherwell
- Barnett Newman
- Jackson Pollock
- Mark Rothko
- Theodoros Stamos
- Clyfford Still
- Bradley Tomlin
- Jack Tworkov

== Tributes ==
- "She was a straight shooter, very respectful of the art and the artists and the museum, something you don't get that much of anymore. The Americans shows set the tone for my time. ... They were exhibitions of what was going on, pointing to the future" – Frank Stella
- "Her eyes were just incredible, smart and very important in the art world. There will never be anyone quite like her again." – Ellsworth Kelly
- "She brought sparkle and prestige and credibility to American art." – James Rosenquist
- "Miller's career was marked by an uncanny ability to recognize new and innovative artists encompassing many different styles. In a career that spanned more than 60 years, she left many more conservative curators in her wake." – Wendy Jeffers

== Awards ==
Awards and honors in recognition of Dorothy Miller's contributions to museum connoisseurship included:

- 1959: Smith College, honorary Doctor of Letters
- 1982: Williams College, honorary degree
- 1982: A Curator's Choice, 1942-63: A Tribute to Dorothy Miller, Rosa Esman Gallery, New York City.
- 1983: Skowhegan School of Painting and Sculpture governor's award

== Books ==
(This is an incomplete list.)

- 1981: The Nelson A. Rockefeller Collection. With Lee Boltin, William Slattery Lieberman, Nelson Rockefeller, and Alfred H. Barr, Jr. Manchester, Vermont: Hudson Hills Press. ISBN 0-933920-24-5.
- 1983: Edward Hicks: His Peaceable Kingdoms and Other Paintings. With Eleanor Price Mather. Newark, Delaware: University of Delaware Press. ISBN 0-87413-208-8.
- 1984: Art at Work: The Chase Manhattan Collection. With Willard C. Butcher, David Rockefeller, Robert Rosenblum, and J. Walter Severinghaus, the project manager for One Chase Manhattan Plaza. Marshall Lee, ed. Boston, Massachusetts: E. P. Dutton. ISBN 0-525-24272-4.
- 1985: Art for the Public: The Collection of the Port Authority of New York and New Jersey. With Sam Hunter. New York City: The Authority. ISBN 0-914773-00-3.
