= Two Thousand =

Studio album by French Kicks
- Released: July 18, 2006
- Recorded: February – March 2006
- Studio: Bomb Shelter Studios, Steak House Studios (Los Angeles, California)
- Genre: indie rock, indie pop
- Length: 41:52
- Label: Startime International / Vagrant Records
- Producer: Doug Boehm, French Kicks

French Kicks chronology
The Trial of the Century (2004)	Two Thousand (2006)	Swimming (2008)

Professional ratings
Review scores
Source	Rating
AllMusic	3/5 stars
Crawdaddy!	favorable
Pitchfork Media	6.0/10
Stylus Magazine	B+

Two Thousand is the third studio album by the indie rock band French Kicks. It was released in 2006.

== Track listing ==
All tracks are written by Nick Stumpf and Josh Wise, except where noted.

Two Thousand track listing
No.	Title	Writer(s)	Length
1.	"So Far We Are"		3:44
2.	"Also Ran"		4:15
3.	"Cloche"		4:26
4.	"Knee High"		4:55
5.	"Keep It Amazed"		5:19
6.	"No Mean Time"	Wise	3:50
7.	"Basement: D.C."	N. Stumpf	4:22
8.	"England Just Will Not Let You Recover"		4:34
9.	"Hey I Wait I"		3:11
10.	"Go On"	N. Stumpf	3:16
Total length:			41:52

== Personnel ==
Credits adapted from the liner notes of Two Thousand.

=== French Kicks ===
- Lawrence Stumpf
- Nick Stumpf
- Aaron Thurston
- Josh Wise

=== Technical ===
- Doug Boehm – production, engineering, mixing
- French Kicks – production
- Dave Collins – mastering

=== Artwork ===
- Josh Wise – artwork
- Josh Rothstein – photography
- Stacy Forte – layout design
