= The Trial of the Century =

Studio album by French Kicks
- Released: May 2004
- Recorded: January 2004
- Genre: Rock/Pop
- Length: 42:39
- Label: Startime International
- Producer: Doug Boehm, French Kicks

French Kicks chronology
| One Time Bells (2002) | The Trial of the Century (2004) | Two Thousand (2006) |

Professional ratings
Review scores
| Source | Rating |
|---|---|
| Allmusic | link |
| Pitchfork Media | 5.9/10 30 Apr 2004 |

The Trial of the Century is the second full-length album by indie rock band French Kicks. It was released in 2004 through Startime Records. The song The Trial of the Century was featured in the movie, and trailer, The Art of Getting By.

== Track listing ==
- Tracks 1,2,5,6,9 and 11 written by Nick Stumpf.
- Tracks 3,4,7 and 10 written by Nick Stumpf and Josh Wise.
- Track 8 written by Josh Wise
1. "One More Time" – 3:17
2. "Don't Thank Me" – 2:58
3. "The Trial of the Century" – 4:14
4. "Oh Fine" – 4:15
5. "The Falls" – 3:30
6. "Was It a Crime" – 3:00
7. "Following Waves" – 4:16
8. "You Could Not Decide" – 4:02
9. "Yes, I Guess" – 2:28
10. "Only So Long" – 5:28
11. "Better Time" – 5:11
