= Holger Cahill =

Icelandic-American curator, writer and arts administrator (1887–1960)

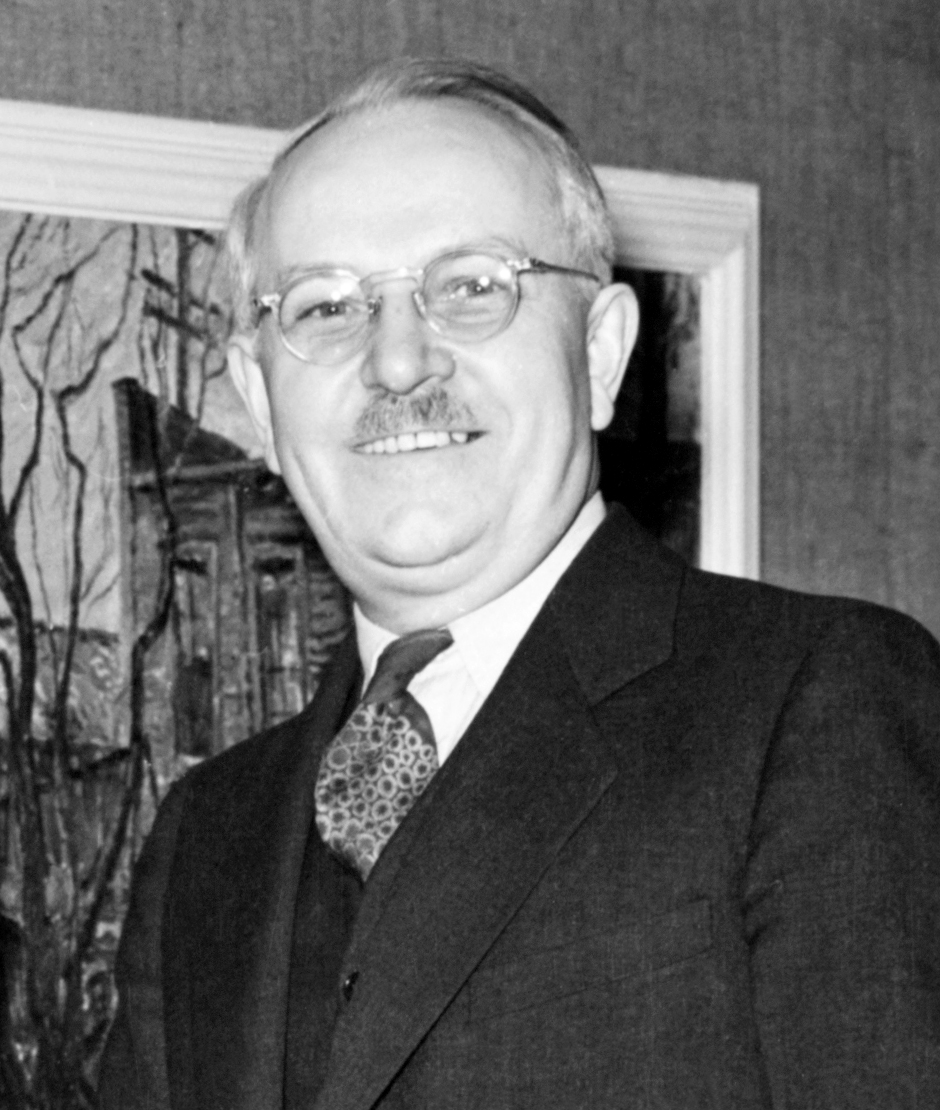
- Holger Cahill on February 15, 1938
- Born: Sveinn Kristján Bjarnason; 13 January 1887; Skógarströnd, Iceland
- Died: 8 July 1960 (aged 73)
- Citizenship: American
- Occupations: Art administrator Art curator Writer

Sveinn Kristján Bjarnarsson (January 13, 1887 – July 8, 1960), also known as Edgar Holger Cahill, was an Icelandic-American curator, writer and arts administrator. He served as the national director of the Federal Art Project of the Works Progress Administration during the New Deal in the United States.

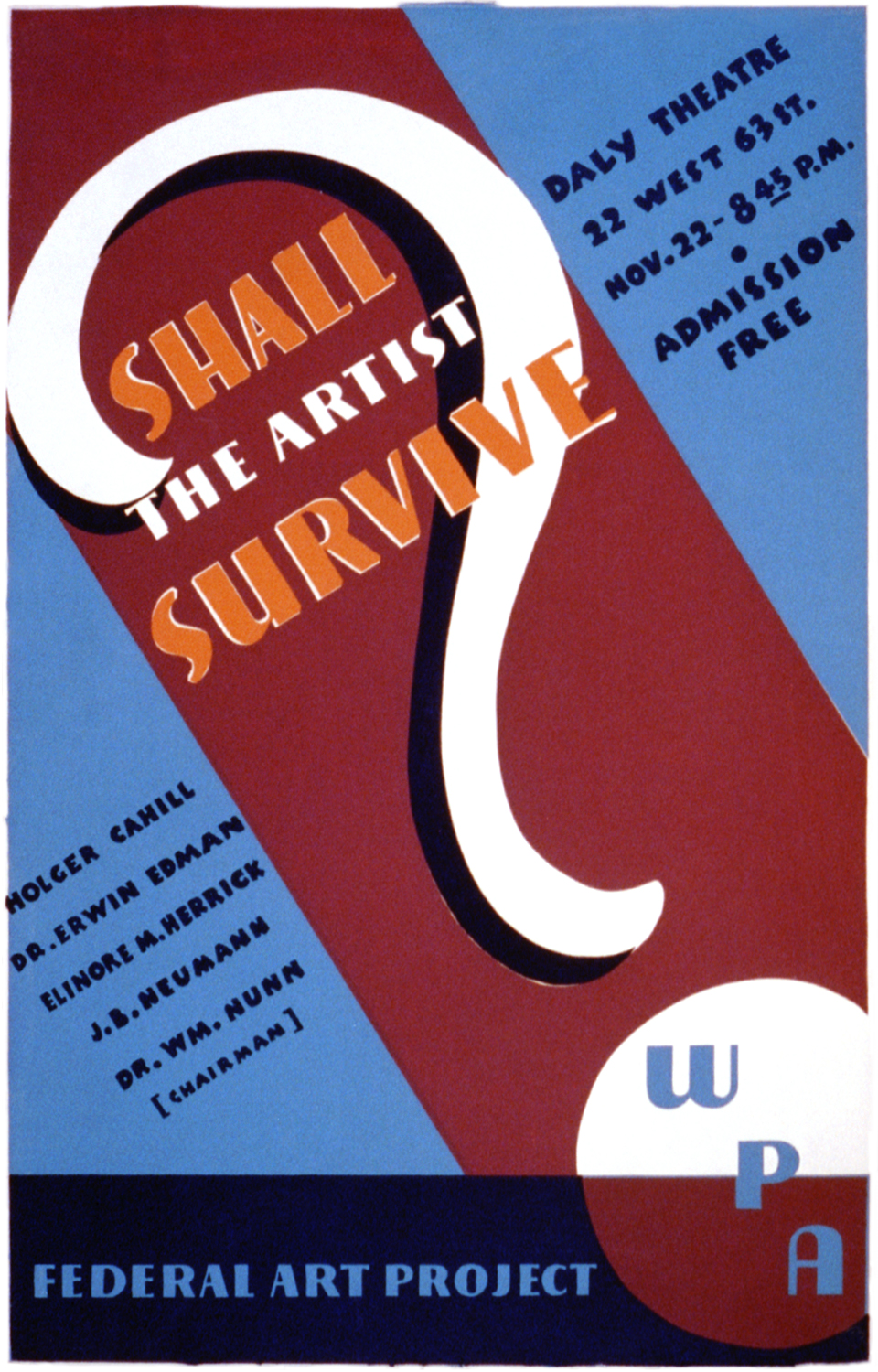
Cahill opened the first of 12 forums on the economic status of artists in the U.S., "Shall the Artist Survive?" (November 22, 1936)

== Biography ==
Cahill was born Sveinn Kristjan Bjarnarsson in Skógarströnd, Iceland on January 13, 1887.

Cahill's Icelandic family migrated to Canada in about 1890 and then to North Dakota as homesteaders, anglicizing their name to Bjornson and eventually, Johnson, although they continued to speak Icelandic at home. Extreme poverty, lack of formal education and domestic strife marked Cahill's early childhood. When he was young, his father abandoned the family and his mother sent the young Cahill to live and work on a farm owned by an Icelandic family 50 miles away where he was mistreated. His mother remarried and had another child, Anna. That marriage also did not last. After two difficult years with the Icelandic farmers, Cahill ran away at first to neighboring farms where he found work and eventually to Winnipeg, in search of distant cousins. The cousins refused to take him in and he ended up in an orphanage. A Gaelic-speaking family in a nearby cooperative farm community adopted Cahill and he was able to attend school regularly for the first time. After several years with the Gaelic family, he returned to North Dakota in search of his mother only to discover that his mother and step-sister had moved. Eventually he found them working on a nearby tenant farm in 1902. His mother had remarried to a younger man named Samson, and she and her son quarreled. Once again, he left home and did not see his mother again for 45 years.

=== Career ===
Cahill's employment in the field of visual arts began in 1921 when he was hired by John Cotton Dana at the Newark Museum and the Society of Independent Artists to write publicity about their activities. As a former journalist and editor, Cahill had learned how to write effectively and he helped create new interest both organizations in the media. Through his friend, the artist John Sloan, Cahill knew many of the leading artists of the day and he encouraged Dana to purchase works by contemporary artists for the museum's growing collection. After Dana's death in 1929, Cahill organized the first major museum surveys of American Folk Art at the Newark Museum in 1930 ("American Primitives") and 1931 ("American Folk Sculpture"). While at Newark, he also published fiction, essays and short stories including art criticism for the magazines Shadowland International Studio and the New York Herald Tribune. He published a novel, Profane Earth in 1927 and, in 1930, "A Yankee Adventurer" a biography of Frederick Townsend Ward and his role in the Taiping Rebellion of 1861. At Newark, he met his future wife, Dorothy Canning Miller whom he married in 1938. Together with the galleries Edith Halpert of the Downtown Gallery, Cahill published a monograph on Pop Hart in 1928, Max Weber in 1930 and Jules Pascin in 1931. Halpert and Cahill also launched a magazine called Space that ran for three issues in January, March and June, 1930.

In 1932–33, Cahill served as acting director of the Museum of Modern Art when the founding director, Alfred H. Barr Jr., took a leave of absence. He organized several notable exhibitions including American Sources of Modern Art, American Folk Art: Art of the Common Man in America and a survey exhibition, American Painting and Sculpture 1862–1932. In 1934, he directed the First Municipal Art Exhibition at Rockefeller Center in New York; the exhibition coincided with the destruction of the mural by Diego Rivera and many of the artists threatened to withdraw. When Cahill left Newark, he employed Dorothy Miller as his assistant on his various projects. At the First Municipal Art Exhibition, Miller stepped in as director when Cahill landed in the hospital and was unable to continue which led to her later position as curator at the Museum of Modern Art.

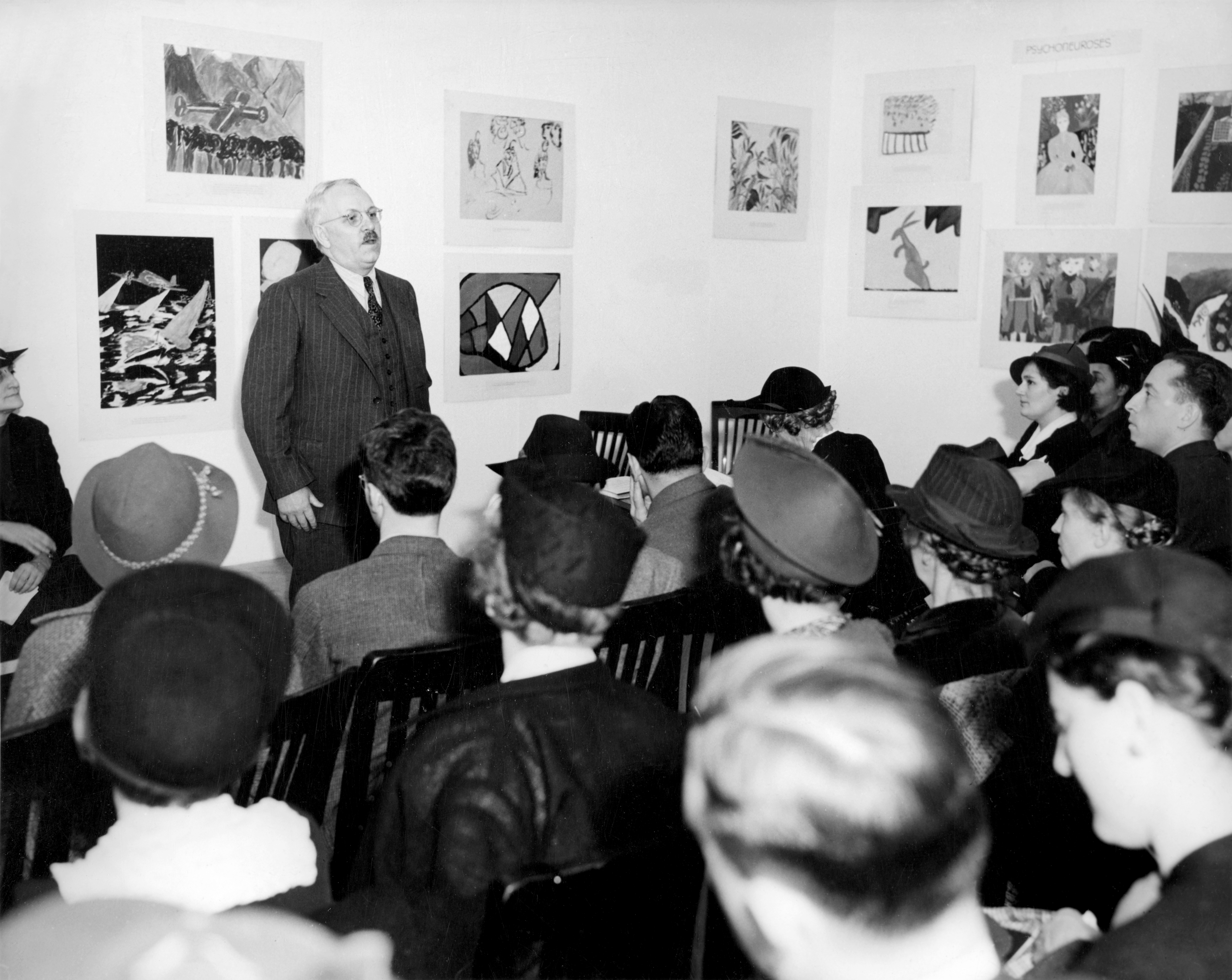
Holger Cahill, national director of the Federal Art Project, speaking at the Harlem Community Art Center (October 24, 1938)

From August 1935 until April 1943, Cahill was the national director of the Federal Art Project, the role for which he is best known today. His contributions to the research, documentation and understanding of the visual arts in America were wide-ranging—from the earliest crafts of the Native Americans to the abstract expressionists. In the 1920s, his early endorsement of American folk art as well as the early American modernists introduced their work to a larger public through exhibitions, catalogues and criticism. During his tenure of the WPA, his oversight of the Index of American Design established a greater understanding of the variety and quality of American iconographic imagery.

Cahill proved to be an imaginative, sensitive and skillful administrator. Under his leadership community art centers were established in over 100 towns and cities nationwide, murals drawing upon the geographical environment were painted in public buildings throughout the country, and some 10,000 artists and craft workers were sustained through the Great Depression. An entire generation of artists was nurtured, their work exhibited, and an expanded public for art was created.

In 1938, Cahill married Dorothy Canning Miller, curator of painting and sculpture at the Museum of Modern Art. The following year, he took a leave of absence from the WPA to stay in New York City and direct a large survey exhibition at the 1939 World's Fair, American Art Today. Through Miller, he continued to meet new artists and he was an avid and interested spectator of all of the programming at the Museum of Modern Art.

=== Writing ===
When the Federal Arts Project ended in 1943, Cahill returned to New York to concentrate on writing novels and essays. Hampered by various illnesses after his busy tenure as Director of the Federal Art Project and a severe heart attack in 1947, he managed to complete two novels, Look South to the Polar Star, in 1947, and The Shadow of My Hand, in 1956, set in the Midwest of his youth. In the same year he began studying poetry with Stanley Kunitz, and taped a memoir for the Columbia University Oral History Project. He also received a Guggenheim Fellowship for work on his novel Stone Dreamer, which was left unfinished at his death in 1960.

Cahill died on July 8, 1960, in Stockbridge, Massachusetts, where he is buried in the town's cemetery.

== Bibliography ==
1921-1925

- Shadowland magazine. August 1921. "John Sloan: Man and Artist" by Edgar Cahill. pp. 11, 71–73.
- Shadowland magazine. December 1921. "A High Northern Renaissance on Iceland".
- The Nation. August 17, 1921 (volume 113, number 2928). "Purity in the Sixth Printing". Hunger by Knut Hamsun, reviewed by Edgar H. Cahill. pp. 181–182.
- The Nation, October 26, 1921 (volume 113, number 2938). "Artists and Business Men". Shallow Soil by Knut Hamsun.
- New York Herald Tribune. November 27, 1921. "Hunger From Hamsun," Dreamers by Knut Hamsun reviewed by Holger Cahill.
- The Bookman, January 1922 (volume 54, number 5). "Icelandic Renaissance". pp. 496–497.
- The New York Times Book Review. February 19, 1922. "Hanging out the Crepe for Europe". pp. 12, 23.
- International Studio. March 1922 (volume 75, number 299). "America Has Its Primitives". pp. 80–83. (Article about the Pueblo-Indian art in the Exhibition of Independent Artists.)
- Shadowland magazine. February 1922. "Ernest Lawson and His America" by Edgar Holger Cahill, pp. 23, 72.
- [Shadowland magazine. June 1922. "Bruce Crane: Master of Landscape" by Edgar Holger Cahill. pp. 11, 70, 75 (with color reproduction).
- Shadowland magazine. August 1922. "Bryson Burroughs" by Edgar Holger Cahill. pp. 11, 66-67 (with color reproductions).
- Shadowland magazine. September 1922. "John Costigan Carries the Flame" by Edgar Holger Cahill, pp. 11, 71 (with color reproductions).
- Shadowland magazine. November 1922. "Hayley Lever, Individualist (The artist who believes that man may draw inspiration from all sources, but that the only deadly sin is imitation)" by Edgar Holger Cahill. p. 11, 77 (with color reproductions).
- International Studio. November 1922 (volume 76, number 306). "Trygue Hammer's Sculpture". pp. 104–107.
- The Freeman. November 23, 1922. Article title unknown, by Holger Cahill, p. 254?.
- Shadowland magazine. February 1923 (volume 7, number 6). "Jonas Lie: Poet of Today" by Edgar Cahill. pp. 11, 70.
- Shadowland magazine. April 1923. "Kenneth Hayes Miller Who Occupies the Place in the World of Art that James Branch Cabell Holds in Literature" by Edgar Cahill. pp. 11, 71.
- Shadowland magazine. June 1923. "The Odyssey of George Hart — Who is the Dean of the Globe-Trotting Painters, and Whose Work Shows a Genuine Gusto for Life" by Edgar Cahill. pp. 11, 70.
- Shadowland magazine. September 1923. "Gaspard and America's Growth" (article about Leon Gaspard of the Milch Galleries by Edgar Cahill.
- Tavern Topics. April 1924. "Norsemen of Old Invade American Art, Viking Warriors and Traditions Embodied in the Beautiful Decorative Motifs of New York's Newest Restaurant" by Edgar H. Cahill. pp. 17, 39.

1926-1930

- Paintings: Newark Museum, (Second List). The Newark Museum Association. 1926. Newark, New Jersey; notes by Holger Cahill.
- Profane Earth. The Macaulay Co., New York 1927. (book jacket drawn by John Sloan; dedicated the book to John Cotton Dana) (fiction).
- New York Herald Tribune book review. November 27, 1927. "Adventures in Lithography" George W. Bellows: His Lithographs reviewed by Holger Cahill.
- George O. "Pop" Hart, The Downtown Gallery, New York, 1928, 25 pages. Essay by Holger Cahill. Some editions of the book were published with an original lithograph in frontispiece.
- Poster. June 1928. "Poster Art in the Newark Museum" by Edgar Holger Cahill, staff member of the Newark Museum and the Newark Public Library.
- Louise Connolly The Newark Museum, "Miss Connolly Continued Her Teaching in the Library and Museum" by Holger Cahill (small booklet published by the Newark Library and Museum at the time of her death. JCD: "these notes on the life of Miss Louise Connolly were prepared by Mrs. Henry B. Twombly of Summit New Jersey and by HC of the library museum and staff").
- Contemporary American Art, Municipal Art Gallery, Atlantic City, New Jersey. 1929. (exhibition dates: June 19 — October 1, 1929). introduction by Holger Cahill (Cahill listed as one of three on the Exhibition Committee.).
- Creative Art. 1929. "The Museum and American Contemporary Art" (the Newark Museum issued a reprint).
- Forbes magazine, August 15, 1929. "The Machine Industry's Need for Art" by John Cotton Dana, in collaboration with Holger Cahill.
- The Museum. Newark, New Jersey. February 1929 (volume II, number 5)., "New American Paintings and Sculpture", pp. 34–35.
- A Yankee Adventurer, The Macaulay Company, New York, 1930. [Fall].
- Americana Illustrated. January 1930 (volume XXIV, number 1). "The Life and Work of John Cotton Dana", pp. 69–84. (by Edgar Holger Cahill).
- Space. Volumes 1-3 — January 1930, March 1930 and June 1930. (Cahill was editor in chief.)
- Max Weber, The Downtown Gallery, New York, 1930, 45 pages, 32 photographic plates. Essay by Holger Cahill. Some editions of the book were published with an original lithograph in frontispiece.
- Modern American Watercolors, January 4 — February 9, 1930, Newark Museum, introduction by Cahill, pp. 7–8.
- American Primitives — An Exhibit of the Paintings of Nineteenth Century Folk Artists. Newark Museum, 1930. Introduction by Cahill (pp. 7–9); descriptive notes by Cahill for "Portraits" (pp. 11– 15); "Landscapes and Other Scenes" (pp. 61–63); "Decorative Pictures" (pp. 69–75); and "Wood Sculpture" (p. 77). (exhibition dates: November 4, 1930 — February 1, 1931).
- The Nation. October 8, 1930 (volume 131, number 3405). "Early Lawlessness" The Outlaw Years by Robert M. Coates, reviewed by Holger Cahill. pp. 380–381.

1931-1935

- Jules Pascin, The Downtown Gallery, New York, 1931, Catalogue text by Holger Cahill. There were also texts by Frank Crowninshield and Henry McBride. (exhibition dates: January 3–25, 1931).
- William Zorach, The Downtown Gallery. Essay by Cahill in exhibition announcement. (exhibition dates: January 27 — February 15, 1931).
- Atelier. June 1931, "American Primitives". pp. 417–424.
- The American Mercury. September 1931 (volume XXIV, number 93). "American Folk Art". pp. 39–46.
- American Folk Sculpture — The Work of Eighteenth and Nineteenth Century Craftsmen. Newark Museum, Newark, New Jersey, 1931. "American Folk Sculpture" (pp. 13–18); "Wood Carving: Ship's Figureheads" (pp. 23–29); "Cigar Store Figures" (pp. 31–32); "Portraits" (pp. 38–39); "Eagles" (p. 48); "Schimmel Carvings" (p. 54–55); "The Pennsylvania Germans" (pp. 56 – 61); "Decoy Birds" (pp. 63–65); "Toys" (p. 68); "Work in Metal" (pp. 71–77); "Fire Marks" (p. 83); "Iron Stove Plates" (pp. 85–86); "Pottery and Plaster Ornaments" (pp. 93–96); "A Note on Stone Carving" (pp. 97–98). (exhibition dates: October 20, 1931 — January 31, 1932).
- Scribner's Magazine. September 1931 (volume XC, number 3). "He-Rain". pp. 259–269 (fiction).
- Scribner's Magazine. December 1931 (volume XC, number 6). "Fun (A Story)". pp. 653–660 (fiction).
- The American Mercury. August 1932 (volume XXVI, number 104). "The Life of Art". pp. 487–494. (fiction).
- Life in the United States — A Collection of Narratives of Contemporary American Life From First Hand Experience or Observation. Charles Scribner's. New York. 1932, 1933. Story by Holger Cahill He-Rain, pp. 79–94. (fiction).
- Formes. March 1932 (number 23). "American Folk Art". pp. 232–234, a reprint of the article from The American Mercury.
- Creative Art. March 1932. "Bernard Karfiol". pp. 181–188.
- Parnassus. March 1932 (volume IV, number III). "Folk Art: Its Place in the American Tradition". pp. 1–4.
- American Folk Art: The Art of the Common Man in America, 1750-1900. The Museum of Modern Art, New York. 1932. Essay, pp. 3–28. (exhibition dates: November 30, 1932 — January 14, 1933).
- Creative Art. December 1932 (volume XI, number 4). "Early Folk Art in America" pp. 254–270. (Reprinted from The Museum of Modern Art exhibition catalogue American Folk Art: The Art of the Common Man in America, 1750-1900).
- America as Americans See It. 1932. edited by Fred J. Ringel, Harcourt Brace, New York. (Cahill wrote "American Art Today", pp. 244–266, introduction by Henry McBride).
- American Painting and Sculpture, 1862-1932. 1932. The Museum of Modern Art, New York. essay, pp. 9–22 (exhibition dates: October 31, 1932 — January 31, 1933).
- American Sources of Modern Art. 1933. The Museum of Modern Art, W. W. Norton and Co. Inc., Essay, pp. 5–21. (exhibition dates: May 10 — June 30, 1933. Cahill was director of the exhibition). This book was also published as Aztec, Inca and Mayan Art by Garrett Press.
- First Municipal Art Exhibition, foreword by Cahill. (exhibition dates: February 28 — March 31, 1934).
- Arshile Gorky, Mellon Galleries, Philadelphia, essays by Cahill, Frederick Kiesler, Harriet Janowitz and Stuart Davis.
- Art in America in Modern Times. 1934, Reynal and Hitchcock, New York, edited by Alfred Barr and Holger Cahill, (essays by Cahill: "American Painting 1865-1934" (pp. 7–50) and "American Sculpture Since the Civil War" (pp. 51–62).
- Anne Goldthwaite, The Downtown Gallery New York 1935. essay by Cahill in exhibition announcement. (exhibition dates: December 11–28, 1935).
- Sculpture by Chaim Gross, Boyer Galleries, Philadelphia, Pennsylvania. Essay by Cahill in exhibition announcement. (exhibition dates: January 16 — February 5, 1935).
- Art in America, A Complete Survey. Halycon House, New York, 1935. Edited by Alfred Barr and Holger Cahill, (essays by Cahill: "Folk and Popular Art" (pp. 42–44); "American Painting 1865-1934" (pp. 65–108); "American Sculpture Since the Civil War" (pp. 109–120)).
- Federal Art Project Manual, U.S. Works Progress Administration, Washington D.C. October 1935. Publication #7120.

1936-1940

- New Horizons in American Art. The Museum of Modern Art, New York, 1936, Introduction by Cahill (exhibition dates: September 14 —- October 21, 1936). Arno reprint in 1969.
- American Art Portfolio, Series One. Raymond and Raymond Publishers. 1936. Introduction by Cahill. pp. 17–25. The essay was also published separately as American Painting, A Short Essay by Holger Cahill by Raymond and Raymond (unknown date).
- Old and New Paths in American Design. November 1936 (12 pages). Newark Museum. (Essay by Holger Cahill, pp. 3–10) (Text of address at Newark Museum, November 6, 1936, on the occasion of the opening of the exhibition of the work of the FAP of the WPA held at the Newark Museum.)
- The Nation. October 10, 1936. Art: "Toward an American Art". (discusses FAP and exhibition at The Museum of Modern Art.)
- Architectural Record. September 1937 (volume 82). Design Trends, "Mural America". Essay by Cahill. pp. 63–68.
- Masters of Popular Painting: Modern Primitives of Europe and America (April 27 — July 24, 1938). The Museum of Modern Art, New York, in collaboration with The Grenoble Museum. Chapter on American primitives "Artists of the People", pp. 95–105 by Cahill.
- House & Garden. July 1938 (volume 74). Wellman, Rita: "American Design: Historic Examples from Index of American Design". pp. 15–39.
- Loren MacIver. East River Gallery. Essay by Cahill in exhibition announcement. (exhibition dates: March 29 — April 16, 1938).
- New York Herald Tribune book review. September 4, 1938. "In a Native Tradition — A Subtle Study of One Artist Whose Roots Lie Deep in Old American Simplicities". Charles Sheeler, Artist in the American Tradition by Constance Rourke, reviewed by Holger Cahill, p. 4.
- Reader's Digest. November 1938. "Art for Our Sake" (Community Art Centers and the WPA).
- American Art Today, New York World's Fair, National Art Society. 1939. Essay, "American Art Today". pp. 19–32.
- Resources For Building America Number 15. 1939. (The speeches contained in this booklet were delivered at the National Meeting in celebration of the eightieth birthday of John Dewey, New York City, October 20–21, 1939.) American Resources in the Arts, pp. 41-?.
- Parnassus. College Art Association, May 1939 (volume XI, number 5). "American Art Today" (reprint of the World's Fair essay). pp. 14–15, 35–37.
- The New York Times, June 18, 1939 (Sunday Gravure Picture Section). "Art: Yesterday Versus Today", Essay by Holger Cahill on the 1939 World's Fair exhibitions: "Moderns". p. ____.
- The Studio. June 1939. "Modern American Art".

1941-1945

- The New Republic. September 14, 1942. The Faces of War — Men of the RAF by Sir William Rothenstein; War Pictures by British Artists: War At Sea; Blitz; RAF; Army' Reviewed by Holger Cahill p. 324.
- John Cotton Dana and the Newark Museum, A Museum in Action: Presenting the Museum's Activities. Catalogue of an exhibition of American paintings and sculpture from the museum's collections, Newark Museum, Newark, New Jersey, 1944. (exhibition dates: October 31, 1944 — January 31, 1945). "Introduction" by Cahill (35th Anniversary Exhibition), 191 pp. ?.
- Canadian Art. February–March 1944 (volume 1, number 3). "Art Goes To Public in the United States". pp. 102–107, 129–131.
- American Contemporary Art. November 1944 (volume 1, number 9). "The Museum and The Community". pp. 9–11.
- USA: An American Review, Volume 2, #9, published by the U.S. Office of War Information, "Government Art Projects" by Holger Cahill, p. 46., 1944?
- The League, Winter, 1944-45, (bulletin published by the Art Students League of New York): "A Defense of the WPA Art Project". pp. 12–13.
- Magazine of Art. May 1945 (volume 38, number 5). "Franklin Delano Roosevelt". p. 163.
- The Studio. July 1945 (volume CXXX, number 628). "Artists in War and Peace". pp. 1–15.
- Art News. October 15–31, 1945. "Stuart Davis". pp. 24–25, 32.

1946-1950

- Magazine of Art. November 1946 (volume 39, number 7). "In Our Time". pp. 308–325.
- ALA News (Artists League of America). Number 1, 1946. "Can Art Survive with its Present Patronage?" (Excerpts from an address given to ALA on February 15, 1946, at the ACA Gallery by Cahill.)
- Look South to the Polar Star, Harcourt Brace and Company, New York. January 23, 1947. (fiction).
- Magazine of Art. May 1947. Book review by Holger Cahill of The Meeting of East and West by F.S.C. Northrup. p. 201.
- Magazine of Art. November 1947 (volume 40, number 7). Principles of Chinese Painting by George Rowley. p. 291.
- Magazine of Art. March 1949 (volume 42, number 3). "A Symposium: The State of American Art". p. 88.
- Magazine of Art, April 1949 (volume 42, number 4). The Painting of Max Weber, "Max Weber: A Reappraisal in Maturity" pp. 128–133.
- Magazine of Art. May 1949 (volume 42, number 5) "Forty Years After: An Anniversary for the A.F.A.". pp. 169–178.
- The Index of American Design, Erwin O. Christensen, Introduction by Holger Cahill, The MacMillan Company, National Gallery of Art, Smithsonian Institution, Washington, D.C., 1950.
- House Beautiful. October 1950. "You Can Trace the Roots of the American Style to America's Folk Art". pp. 138–139, 206–209, 273.
- Antiques. May 1950. "Folk Art Issue. What is American Folk Art?, A Symposium" (included Jack Baur, Holger Cahill, Edwin Christensen, Carl Drepperd, James Flexner, John Kouwenhoven, Nina Fletcher Little, Edgar Preston Richardson, Frank O. Spinney, Janet MacFarlane and Louis Jones)". p. 355.

1951-1955

- Antiques. March 1951 (volume LIX, number 3). "Artisan and Amateur in American Folk Art". pp. 210–211.
- Minnesota History, 1951, The French in America, 1520–1880, Detroit Institute of Arts Exhibition, reviewed by Holger Cahill. p. 36.
- Introduction to "Documentary Record of Fire Marks" published by the HV Smith Museum of the Home Insurance Company, 1952.
- Magazine of Art. November 1952 (volume 45, number 7). "Niles Spencer". pp. 313–315.
- Downtown Gallery, Exhibition of Paintings by Niles Spencer, October 28 — November 15, 1952, Essay by Cahill in the exhibition announcement (reprint of the above essay from the Magazine of Art).
- New York Herald Tribune book review. April 6, 1952. "Independent Citizen of the World of Art — An Understanding Monograph on the Rebel Painter John Sloan", John Sloan, by Lloyd Goodrich, reviewed by Holger Cahill.
- Saturday Review. December 20, 1952. "War Photo Pioneers", Divided We Fought — A Pictorial History of the Civil War, 1861-1865 by Hirst Milhollen, Milton Kaplan and Hulen Stuart, reviewed by Holger Cahill. p. 12.
- Morgan Russell. Rose Fried Gallery. Essay by Cahill in exhibition announcement. (exhibition dates: October 26 — November 1953).
- New York Herald Tribune. "John Sloan". 1953?. p. ?.
- New York Herald Tribune. April 12, 1953. "Artists and Illustrators of the Old West", Fifty Pictorial Years of the Old West, by Robert Taft, reviewed by Holger Cahill, p. 4.
- Saturday Review. November 7, 1953. "Still Collection". After The Hunt by Alfred Frankenstein, reviewed by Holger Cahill. p. 51.
- Art Digest., February 15, 1954. "Ancient Art of the Andes". pp. 7–9.
- New York Herald Tribune. December 12, 1954. "A Witty Westerner on Chinese Painting". Aspects of Chinese Painting by Alan Priest, reviewed by Holger Cahill. p. 3.
- The New York Times Book Review. November 7, 1954. "Pathways to the Past". The Eagle, the Jaguar and the Serpent, Indian Art of the Americas: North America, reviewed by Holger Cahill. p. 3.
- 50 Ans d'art aux Etats Unis. Introduction by Cahill, dated February 16, 1955. (Exhibition held at the Musee d'Art Modern in Paris, France.)
- New York Herald Tribune. January 2, 1955. "Serene Fields". Amishland by Kiehl and Christian Newswanger, reviewed by Holger Cahill, p. 4.
- Saturday Review. November 26, 1955. John Singer Sargent by Charles Merrill Mount, reviewed by Holger Cahill. p. 16.

1956-1960

- The Shadow of My Hand. Harcourt Brace, New York 1956. (fiction).
- Marg, A Magazine of the Arts, Volume X, December 1956, #1, American Supplement: "Twentieth Century Art in the U.S." "Painting" (pp. 46–62) and "Sculpture" (pp. 63–67), illustrated.
- Modern Art in the United States, a selection from the collections of The Museum of Modern Art, New York, shown at the Tate Gallery, essay "American Painting and Sculpture in the Twentieth Century" by Cahill.
- The New York Times Book Review. November 10, 1957. "Yesterday in the Middle Americas", Indian Art of Mexico and Central America by Miguel Covarrubias, reviewed by Holger Cahill.
- New York Herald Tribune book review. December 6, 1959. "George Catlin: In His Art the Frontier American Indian Endures". George Catlin and the Old Frontier by Harold McCracken; George Catlin: Episodes From "Life Among the Indians" and "Last Rambles" edited by Marvin C. Ross, reviewed by Holger Cahill. p. ?.
- New York Herald Tribune book review. January 3, 1960. "The Rich Sweep of the Great Rivers He Painted Was in Bingham's Art", George Caleb Bingham: River Portraitist by John Francis McDermott, reviewed by Holger Cahill. p. ?.
- New York Herald Tribune book review. July 10, 1960. "He Gambled and Pioneered, and Fathered a Painter", Son of a Gamblin Man by Mari Sandoz.
