= The Soft Pack (album) =

Studio album by the Soft Pack
- Released: February 2, 2010
- Recorded: July 2008; August 2009
- Studio: Saltlands Studio (Brooklyn, NY); Manny Nieto Estudio
- Genre: Indie rock
- Length: 32:08
- Label: Kemado; Heavenly
- Producer: Eli Janney; Rob Barbato

The Soft Pack chronology
The Muslims (2008)	The Soft Pack (2010)	Strapped (2012)

Singles from The Soft Pack
- 1. "Parasites" Released: 2008; 2. "Answer to Yourself" Released: 2009; 3. "C'mon" Released: 2010; 4. "More Or Less" Released: 2010

The Soft Pack is the debut full-length studio album by American California-based indie rock band the Soft Pack. It was released on February 2, 2010, through Kemado Records in the United States and Heavenly Recordings worldwide. The recording sessions took place at Saltlands Studio in Brooklyn in August 2009, except for the song "Parasites", which was recorded at Manny Nieto Estudio in July 2008. The album was produced by Eli Janney, except for the song "Parasites", which was produced by Rob Barbato. The album debuted at number 27 on the US Heatseekers Albums chart.

The album spawned four singles: "Parasites", "Answer to Yourself", "C'mon" and "More or Less". Its second single, "Answer to Yourself", which peaked at No. 51 on the UK Physical Singles Chart and No. 14 on the Mexico Ingles Airplay chart, became the final song streamed on WOXY.com before its sudden shutdown on March 23, 2010. It is also used for the commercial of the Dutch beer brand Grolsch since August 2010 and was included in the 2013 video game Grand Theft Auto V on the in-game radio station Vinewood Boulevard Radio. The album's third single, "C'mon", reached No. 26 on the UK Physical Singles Chart and No. 10 on the Mexico Ingles Airplay. The fourth and final single off of the album, "More or Less", made it to No. 44 on the UK Physical Singles Chart.

== Critical reception ==
Professional ratings
Aggregate scores
Source	Rating
AnyDecentMusic?	6.6/10
Metacritic	74/100
Review scores
Source	Rating
AllMusic	4/5 stars
The A.V. Club	B+
The Austin Chronicle	4/5 stars
Boston Phoenix	2/4 stars
Drowned in Sound	8/10
The Guardian	3/5 stars
musicOMH	2.5/5 stars
NME	3/5 stars
Pitchfork	7.1/10
PopMatters	8/10

The Soft Pack was met with generally favourable reviews from music critics. At Metacritic, which assigns a normalized rating out of 100 to reviews from mainstream publications, the album received an average score of 74, based on twenty-one reviews. The aggregator AnyDecentMusic? has the critical consensus of the album at a 6.6 out of 10, based on eighteen reviews.

Doug Freeman of The Austin Chronicle wrote: "for all the influences that rip through the LP, the youthful abandon recasts them for a new generation". Jason Heller of The A.V. Club wrote: "granted, The Soft Pack has knife-edged pop riffs and crooned vocals galore. But a closer probe reveals a knack for punky songcraft and caffeinated oomph that could have easily been inherited from fellow San Diego group Hot Snakes". AllMusic's Heather Phares wrote: "The Soft Pack allows this band an almost completely clean break with their past while showing they're dynamic no matter what they're called". Andrzej Lukowski of Drowned in Sound wrote: "it's done brilliantly, with no frills, no ego, no sense of homage (just some damn fine influences), no fat, no bullshit, nothing bar hooks, energy and a certain air of ineffable sadness for good measure. Sometimes you need to believe a scene or movement will save your life. Other times, there's nothing wrong being casually blown away by a record like The Soft Pack". Saxon Baird of PopMatters found it "never sound cliche, but excitingly new, even if their influences can be clearly identified". Stuart Berman of Pitchfork wrote: "though Lamkin's monotone voice is not the most expressive instrument--it barely wavers whether the occasion calls for a Monks-style organ vamp ("Move Along") or a prom-night embrace ("Mexico")--each album side gradually ratchets up the tension and releases it through a raucous rave-up ("Pull Out" on side A, "Parasites" on side B) that successfully bridges the Soft Pack's Nuggets-schooled ethos with the modern-day discord of San Diegan patron saints Hot Snakes".

In mixed reviews, Laura Snapes of NME wrote: "they may be strutting right down the middle of the road, but they look pretty damn cool doing it. The Soft Pack make being A-OK into something to be proud of". Will Dean of The Guardian wrote: "that it's derivative isn't that much of a stick to beat them with, though--they've produced 30 minutes of glossy, singalong, preppy pop-punk". Michael Cragg of musicOMH resumed: "it's not a bad album, it's not a good album, it's merely an alright album and that's the real problem". Mikael Wood of The Boston Phoenix concluded: "nothing about The Soft Pack makes you wanna know who these guys are or what they have to say about the world outside their practice space".

== Track listing ==
All tracks are written by Matt Lamkin, Matty McLoughlin, David Lantzman and Brian Hill.

No.	Title	Producer(s)	Length
1.	"C'mon"	Eli Janney	2:13
2.	"Down on Loving"	Eli Janney	2:08
3.	"Answer to Yourself"	Eli Janney	3:20
4.	"Move Along"	Eli Janney	2:20
5.	"Pull Out"	Eli Janney	3:59
6.	"More or Less"	Eli Janney	3:35
7.	"Tides of Time"	Eli Janney	2:48
8.	"Flammable"	Eli Janney	2:32
9.	"Mexico"	Eli Janney	4:12
10.	"Parasites"	Rob Barbato	5:01
Total length:			32:08

== Personnel ==
- Matt Lamkin – songwriter, vocals, guitar, artwork
- Matty McLoughlin – songwriter, guitar
- Dave Lantzman – songwriter, backing vocals, bass
- Brian Hill – songwriter, backing vocals, drums
- Eli Janney – producer & mixing (tracks: 1–9)
- Rob Barbato – producer (track 10)
- Manny Nieto – engineering (track 10)
- Aaron Rutledge – engineering assistant (tracks: 1–9)
- Joe Lambert – mastering
- Shay Peretz – photography
- Brett Erickson – layout
- Jean Coffey – management

== Charts ==
Chart (2010)	Peak position
US Heatseekers Albums (Billboard)	27
