= People That I Meet =

Studio album by The Natural History
- Released: November 27, 2007
- Recorded: 2004
- Genre: Indie rock
- Length: 37:59
- Label: Beat Beat Beat
- Producer: self-produced

The Natural History chronology
Beat Beat Heartbeat (2003)	People That I Meet (2007)

People That I Meet is The Natural History's second full-length album. The album was recorded in 2004 and slated for a 2005 release date. However, the band soon split from their record label Startime International, and the album's release was put on hold. The band was looking to release the album on a different label shortly thereafter; however, People That I Meet would not reach the general public for over 2 years. Finally in 2007, the band self-released the album through the online record store CD Baby in digital format only.

Differing from the band's two previous releases in which Max Tepper contributed all lead vocals, People That I Meet features Julian Tepper as lead vocalist on a few songs.

== Track listing ==
1. "People That I Meet" – 4:04
2. "Julie Tender" – 3:47
3. "Ohio Room" – 3:29
4. "Don't You Ever" – 3:40
5. "Drunk Dancer" – 2:54
6. "Take Me Down Another Way" – 3:27
7. "Princeton Junction" – 3:30
8. "Green Grass" – 5:01
9. "Fight Or Make Up Mind" – 3:16
10. "Beggar's Throne" – 4:51

=== Notes about the songs ===
- A music video for the title track "People That I Meet" was directed, edited and graphicized by The Wilderness, that is Juliet Rios and Gabe Imlay.
- "Don't You Ever" was covered by indie rock band Spoon, which appears on their studio album Ga Ga Ga Ga Ga as "Don't You Evah".
- "People That I Meet", "Drunk Dancer", and "Take Me Down Another Way" feature Julian Tepper on lead vocals.

== Credits ==
- All songs Tepper, Tepper, and Vockins
- Produced by Joe Chiccarelli
- Recorded at Brooklyn Recording, Brooklyn, NY
  - Recorded by Joe Chiccarelli with assistant engineer Yohei Goto
  - Recorded by Andrew Taub (additional tracks)
- Recorded at Miner Street Studios, Philadelphia, PA
  - Recorded by Brian McTear
- Mixed by Christopher Shaw
- Artwork by Todd St. John
