= The Natural History (band) =

- Derek Vockins, Julian Tepper, Max Tepper (from left)

Background information
- Origin: New York City, New York, United States
- Genres: Indie rock
- Years active: 2001 – 2005
- Labels: Startime International
- Past members: Max Tepper; Julian Tepper; Derek Vockins; Brad Swiniarski; Joachim Kearns; John Caselli; Tim McCoy
- Website: Official MySpace page

The Natural History were a band composed of Tepper brothers singer–guitarist Max and bassist Julian, along with drummer Derek Vockins. After playing locally in the New York area and self-recording their own three-song EP, The Natural History caught the ear of local NYC label Startime International, whose roster includes Brendan Benson, The Walkmen, The French Kicks, among others. Recording with Greg Talenfeld at Stonehouse studio in Nyack, New York, the band released the finished product as a self-titled EP in July 2002. The EP was promoted with a year-full of touring with Enon and Spoon, whereupon the band also found time to record their debut full-length effort Beat Beat Heartbeat, which was released in May 2003.

In 2004, The Natural History recorded a second album called People That I Meet, which was due in the spring of 2005; however, the band soon split from their record label Startime International, and the record's release was postponed indefinitely. Finally, after nearly two years of fishing for a new record label, the record was self-released by the band in November 2007. One of the songs that ended up on the album, "Don't You Ever", was covered by Spoon on their sixth studio album Ga Ga Ga Ga Ga. Spoon also included The Natural History's original version of the song on their EP Don't You Evah, which was released on April 8, 2008. Spoon included "Don't You Evah" on Everything Hits at Once: The Best of Spoon, released by Matador Records in July 2019. An article written for Playboy magazine by Julian Tepper includes a Q & A with Spoon's Britt Daniel, in which the Tepper brothers and Daniel recount the story behind "Don't You Evah".

After People That I Meet was completed in 2004, Derek Vockins left the band to raise a family. He was replaced with drummer Tim McCoy. The band also added a second guitarist, Brooklyn based John Caselli. The newly formed quartet toured the East Coast and Midwest in the Spring of 2005, and followed up that summer with a 3 week tour of England, Norway and Sweden. The new line-up never took wings, and the band dissolved shortly after.

== Band members ==
- Max Tepper – Guitar, vocals
- Julian Tepper – Bass
- Derek Vockins – Drums (2001–04)
- Tim McCoy – Drums (2004–05)
- John Caselli – Guitar (2004–05)
- Sean Hogan – Melodica (2004–06)

== Discography ==
=== Albums ===
- The Natural History (EP) 2002 Startime International
- Beat Beat Heartbeat (LP) 2003 Startime International
- People That I Meet (LP) 2007 Beat Beat Beat

== Trivia ==
- Max and Julian Tepper are the sons of Grammy-nominated songwriter Robert Tepper, who penned Benny Mardones' 1980 and 1989 hit "Into the Night", one of 10 recordings to ever ascend to the top 20 of the Billboard Hot 100 chart twice. He also had one top 40 hit as an artist, hitting #22 in 1986 with "No Easy Way Out" from the soundtrack to the 1985 film Rocky IV.
