= Saltlands Studio =

Coordinates: 40.703006°N 73.986744°W

Saltlands Studio is a recording studio based in the New York City neighborhood of Dumbo, Brooklyn, founded in 2007 by owner Steve Salett and partners Dawn Landes and Gary Maurer. It was later joined by music producers and engineers Eli Janney, Jim Smith, and Aaron Rutledge. The studio gained notoriety with records by French Kicks, Alexi Murdoch, Josh Ritter, The Soft Pack, Wilco, Robbers on High Street, Obits, and the Trachtenburg Family Slideshow Players. The studio also functions as a collective of commercial composers, and in the spring of 2010 the studio received attention for the composition of a song that was awarded the Cannes Lions 2010 "Best Use of Music in a Commercial" Award for the Match.com commercial.

In 2010, Larry Crane interviewed Dawn Landes of Saltlands. The article was featured in Issue No. 80 of TapeOp. In March 2011, Janice Brown of SonicScoop interviewed Steve Salett and producer/engineer Gary Maurer.

Artists and visiting producers who have recorded at Saltlands include:

- Alexi Murdoch
- Allie Moss
- Andrew Vladeck
- Anne Heaton
- Annie Keating
- Arizona
- Au Revoir Simone
- Balthrop, Alabama
- The Bandana Splits
- Benjamin Cartel
- Bob Hoffnar
- Brendan Canty
- Brian Bender
- Caithlin De Marrais
- Chris Erikson
- Dawn Landes
- Don Piper
- Doveman
- Drazy Hoops
- End Up Records
- The Famous Letters
- The Fancy Shapes
- Frally
- French Kicks
- Geoff Sanoff
- The Gray Goods
- Girl Friday
- Hem
- Ithaca
- Jason Mercer
- Jeff Hill
- Jeremy Sisto
- Jesse Neumann and Wolf Face
- Jolie Holland
- Josh Ritter
- Julia Steele Allen
- Mark Ganzglass
- Matt Shane
- Matt Trowbridge
- Michael Shannon
- Milan McKinnley
- Motion City Soundtrack
- My Sister in 1994
- The Ne'er Do Evers
- Nick Stumpf
- Nick Zinner
- Norden Bombsight
- Obits
- The Oxygen Ponies
- Pela
- Peter Salett
- The Poison Tree
- The Present
- PROJECT Trio
- Randy Russo
- Ray Rizzo
- Robbers on High Street
- Ryan Miller (Guster)
- Rusty Santos (Animal Collective, The Present)
- Sam Amidon
- Sam Kassirer
- Sarah Blust
- Seb Leon
- Shahzad Ismaily (Tom Waits)
- Sondre Lerche
- Thieving Irons
- Thom Monahan
- Tim "Love" Lee
- Tjeerd Bomhof (Voicst)
- Trachtenburg Family Slideshow Players
- Tuppy the Band
- Turner Cody
- Walter Martin
- We Are Augustines
- Wilco

== See also ==
- So Runs the World Away
- Swimming
- The Soft Pack
