= One Time Bells =

Studio album by French Kicks
- Released: May 7, 2002
- Recorded: December 2001
- Genre: Rock/Pop
- Length: 38:43
- Label: Startime International

French Kicks chronology
Young Lawyer (2001)	One Time Bells (2002)	The Trial of the Century (2004)

Professional ratings
Review scores
Source	Rating
AllMusic	4.5/5 stars
Blender	3/5 stars
Pitchfork Media	6.6/10

One Time Bells is the first studio album by the pop rock band French Kicks. It was released in 2002.

== Track listing ==
All songs written by French Kicks (Jamie Krents, Nick Stumpf, Matthew Stinchcomb, Josh Wise) unless otherwise noted.

1. "Wrong Side" (Stumpf) – 3:28
2. "When You Heard You" (Stumpf, Wise) – 2:33
3. "Down Now" (Stumpf, Wise) – 4:01
4. "Crying Just for Show" – 3:32
5. "Close to Modern" (Stumpf) – 2:51
6. "1985" – 3:51
7. "Right in Time" – 3:50
8. "Trying Whining" (Stumpf) – 2:59
9. "One Time Bells" (Stinchcomb, Stumpf) – 4:50
10. "Where We Went Off" (Stumpf, Wise) – 3:05
11. "Sunday Night Is Fair" – 3:43

== Japanese version ==
The Japanese and European versions of One Time Bells had a re-arranged track listing, extra tracks and different cover art.

1. "When You Heard You"
2. "Wrong Side" (Alt. Version)
3. "Crying Just for Show"
4. "Down Now"
5. "Close to Modern"
6. "Right in Time"
7. "Trying Whining"
8. "One Time Bells"
9. "Where We Went Off"
10. "Sunday Night Is Fair"
11. "Piano"
12. "1985"
13. "Was It a Crime" (Demo Version)

== European version ==
1. "When You Heard You"
2. "Wrong Side" (Alt. Version)
3. "Crying Just for Show"
4. "Down Now"
5. "Close to Modern"
6. "Right in Time"
7. "Trying Whining"
8. "One Time Bells"
9. "Where We Went Off"
10. "Sunday Night Is Fair"
11. "Piano"
