= Ga Ga Ga Ga Ga =

Studio album by Spoon
- Released: July 10, 2007
- Recorded: September 2006 – January 2007
- Studio: Public Hi-Fi (Austin, Texas); The Mob House (Austin, Texas); Cherokee (Los Angeles); Ocean (Burbank, California)
- Genre: Indie rock; post-punk revival; art rock; indie pop
- Length: 36:26
- Label: Merge; Anti-
- Producer: Jon Brion; Britt Daniel; Jim Eno; Mike McCarthy; Spoon

Spoon chronology
Gimme Fiction (2005)	Ga Ga Ga Ga Ga (2007)	Transference (2010)

Singles from Ga Ga Ga Ga Ga
- 1. "The Underdog" Released: July 5, 2007; 2. "Don't You Evah" Released: April 8, 2008

Ga Ga Ga Ga Ga is the sixth studio album by American rock band Spoon. It was first released on July 10, 2007, through Merge Records and Anti-. It received critical acclaim and appeared on several year-end album lists. The album debuted at number 10 on the U.S. Billboard 200 and at number 1 on the Billboard Top Independent Albums, selling 46,000 copies in its first week. By January 2010, the album had sold 318,000 copies in the United States. It was supported by two singles; "The Underdog" and "Don't You Evah".

== Production ==
"Don't Make Me a Target" was originally written by Daniel while Spoon was producing its previous album, Gimme Fiction. The band practiced it "quite a bit" before the release of Gimme Fiction, but ended up shelving it for a year after unsuccessful attempts to work out an arrangement they liked. When it was recorded a year later, the drum part was recorded without tom-toms the first time. Drummer Jim Eno then recorded the tom-toms separately with a drastically different microphone arrangement. This gave them a much more reverb-laden sound, as if "in a tunnel".

The track "You Got Yr. Cherry Bomb" was a song the band "really struggled with". This led them to record it three different ways, including a "space rock" version found on the bonus disc and heard distantly at the end of the album arrangement.

At the beginning of "Don't You Evah", Daniel can be heard repeatedly asking "Jim, can you record the talkback?". According to Daniel, he was asking Jim Eno to record the talkback microphone that was being manned by producer Mike McCarthy to a separate track. McCarthy would make comments to Daniel over the talkback microphone at the studio desk as Daniel was singing, and Daniel and Eno considered McCarthy's comments to be ridiculous. As the intro continued, Daniel began singing along with the guitar line, which can also be heard on the final mix.

The vinyl version has no run-out groove on side two. Instead, it ends on a continuous loop of music that appears after the end of the song "Black Like Me".

== Packaging and release ==
The album's title is the former title for the song "The Ghost of You Lingers", which was meant to sound like the song's staccato piano part. The band changed the song's title, but decided to adopt the name "Ga Ga Ga Ga Ga" as the album title, with Britt Daniel calling it a "great little Dadaist term". Its cover art comes from a portrait of the artist and sculptor Lee Bontecou, taken by the Italian photographer Ugo Mulas in 1963. The completed sculpture on the right is now in the collection of the Honolulu Museum of Art.

An iTunes-exclusive bonus track, "Deep Clean", was packaged with Ga Ga Ga Ga Ga. A limited edition copy of the album was released along with a bonus disc entitled Get Nice! The disc includes 23 minutes of mostly instrumental songs and a few demo tracks. Early buyers of the album also received a free 7" containing a demo of "The Underdog", and the B-side "It Took a Rumor to Make Me Wonder, Now I'm Convinced I'm Going Under", which had previously appeared on the UK edition of the "Sister Jack" single.

== Reception ==
Professional ratings
Aggregate scores
Source	Rating
Metacritic	84/100
Review scores
Source	Rating
AllMusic	5/5 stars
The A.V. Club	B+
Entertainment Weekly	A−
The Guardian	3/5 stars
MSN Music (Consumer Guide)	B+
Pitchfork	8.5/10
Q	4/5 stars
Rolling Stone	4/5 stars
Spin	4/5 stars
Uncut	4/5 stars

Ga Ga Ga Ga Ga received critical acclaim from music critics. At Metacritic, which assigns a normalized rating out of 100 to reviews from mainstream publications, the album received an average score of 84 based on 33 reviews, indicating "universal acclaim". In a review for Entertainment Weekly, Sean Howe complimented the "inventory of sounds" on Ga Ga Ga Ga Ga, calling it "one of those 'taking stock' records that refines and collates everything that came before". PopMatters' Zeth Lundy cited the album as the band's "most groove-oriented effort", thanks in part to the addition of Eric Harvey and Rob Pope to the band's recording line-up, and concluded by writing that "there's plenty on Ga Ga Ga Ga Ga to suggest that the band harbors its most intimate operational relationships outside the norm." Heather Phares of AllMusic praised its "remarkable blend of focus and creativity" and noted that "even if Spoon's modus operandi seems overly regimented on paper, the results are just as elegant as they are fun." Giving it a "Best New Music" designation, Eric Harvey of Pitchfork called the album a "wonderfully singular indie rock record".

The album appeared on several year-end and decade-end lists released by music publications. cokemachineglow rated it the best album of 2007. Pitchfork ranked it the 7th best album of 2007 and later ranked it the 35th best album of the decade. The album was at #10 on Rolling Stone's list of the Top 50 Albums of 2007. Delusions of Adequacy rated it the 2nd best album of 2007 and the 43rd best of the decade. Tiny Mix Tapes ranked it the 9th best of the year. Treble ranked it the 3rd best album of 2007 and the 31st best of the decade. Q and Glide also ranked it the 66th and 28th best albums of the decade respectively.

== Track listing ==
All songs produced by Britt Daniel, Jim Eno and Mike McCarthy, and engineered by Jim Eno and Mike McCarthy, except "The Underdog", produced by Jon Brion and Spoon, and engineered by Greg Koller.

All tracks are written by Britt Daniel, except where noted.

No.	Title	Length
1.	"Don't Make Me a Target"	3:55
2.	"The Ghost of You Lingers"	3:34
3.	"You Got Yr. Cherry Bomb"	3:08
4.	"Don't You Evah" (written by Julian Tepper, Max Tepper, Derek Vockins)	3:36
5.	"Rhthm [sic] & Soul"	3:30
6.	"Eddie's Ragga" (written by Britt Daniel, Jim Eno, Eric Harvey, Eddie Robert)	3:39
7.	"The Underdog"	3:42
8.	"My Little Japanese Cigarette Case"	3:03
9.	"Finer Feelings"	4:54
10.	"Black Like Me"	3:25
Total length:		36:26

iTunes edition
No.	Title	Length
11.	"Deep Clean"	3:45

Japanese edition
No.	Title	Length
11.	"I Summon You (Cool)" (from the Get Nice! bonus EP)	1:28
12.	"You Got Yr. Cherry Bomb (Garage Reverb)" (from the Get Nice! bonus EP)	3:13

=== Get Nice! ===
The first pressing of the Ga Ga Ga Ga Ga CD release included the bonus EP Get Nice!, which contains alternative versions of "I Summon You" (from the previous album Gimme Fiction) and "You Got Yr. Cherry Bomb". It also includes many previously unreleased instrumental tracks.

No.	Title	Length
1.	"I Got Mine"	2:34
2.	"Be Still My Servant"	1:24
3.	"Leave Your Effects Where They're Easily Seen"	0:56
4.	"I Summon You (Cool)"	1:28
5.	"Mean Mad Margaret"	1:37
6.	"Love Makes You Feel"	2:38
7.	"You Got Yr. Cherry Bomb (Garage Reverb)"	3:13
8.	"Tasty Fish"	1:18
9.	"Dracula's Cigarette"	1:24
10.	"1975"	1:39
11.	"I Can Feel It Fade Like an AM Single"	3:12
12.	"Curfew Tolls"	1:33
Total length:		23:03

=== Bonus 7-inch single ===
Pre-orders for the vinyl release of Ga Ga Ga Ga Ga included a 7" vinyl single with a demo version of "The Underdog". The B-side of the single is "It Took A Rumor To Make Me Wonder, Now I'm Convinced I'm Going Under" a song which has been previously released under the name "It Took A Rumor To Make Me Wonder Now I'm Afraid I'm Going Under" on the UK release of "Sister Jack".

No.	Title	Length
1.	"The Underdog (demo)"	3:12
2.	"It Took A Rumor To Make Me Wonder, Now I'm Convinced I'm Going Under" (from the "Sister Jack" UK release)	4:47
Total length:		7:59

== Personnel ==
Personnel taken from Ga Ga Ga Ga Ga liner notes.

Spoon

- Britt Daniel – vocals
- Jim Eno – drums
- Eric Harvey – piano, keys
- Rob Pope – bass

Additional musicians

- Ron Blake – trumpet on "The Underdog"
- Jon Brion – bass, Chamberlin, and hammer on "The Underdog"
- John Catchings – cello on "Black Like Me"
- Matthew Colecchi – koto on "My Little…"
- Jason Freese – saxophone on "The Underdog"
- Graham Hughes – backing vocals on "Eddie's Raga"
- Eggo Johanson – tambourine
- Yasmine Kittles – backing vocals on "Rhthm and Soul"
- Mike McCarthy – koto on "My Little…"
- Tommy Poole – horns on "Cherry Bomb"
- Francisco Torres – trombone on "Underdog"
- Tosca string quartet – strings on "Black Like Me"
- Billy White – flamenco guitar on ""My Little…"

Production

- Mike McCarthy – production and engineering (all except "The Underdog")
- Britt Daniel – production, design
- Jim Eno – production; engineering (all except "The Underdog")
- Jon Brion – production on "The Underdog"
- Eric Harvey – production on "The Underdog"
- Rob Pope – production on "The Underdog"
- Greg Koller – engineering on "The Underdog"
- Matthew Colecchi – engineering assistance
- Todd Brodie – engineering assistance
- Bret Rausch – engineering assistance
- Leslie Richter – engineering assistance
- Howie Weinberg – mastering
- Ugo Mulas – cover photo

== Notes ==
- "Don't You Evah" is a cover of the song "Don't You Ever" by The Natural History. The original song can be found on the album People That I Meet and on Spoon's EP Don't You Evah.
- "Eddie's Ragga" is named after Eddie Robert from the band I Love You But I've Chosen Darkness, which also comes from Austin, Texas. Eddie Robert has also written parts of the song.
- "Finer Feelings" uses a sample from the song "Industrial Spy" by the Jamaican reggae artist Mikey Dread. The song was written by Micheal G. Campbell and can be found on Dread's 1979 album African Anthem.
- "Don't You Evah" in part of the soundtrack of Hulu miniseries 11.22.63, episode "The Rabbit Hole".
- "The Underdog" was featured in the 2017 film Spider-Man: Homecoming.

== Release history ==
Country	Date
Australia	July 7, 2007
United States	July 10, 2007
Japan	December 5, 2007

== Charts ==
Ga Ga Ga Ga Ga debuted at number 10 on the Billboard 200 at 46,000 copies sold. In week 2, it fell to 35 with 19,000, then 55 with 12,000 on August 1, 2007. In week 4, it fell to number 58, selling 11,000—a total of 88,000 copies in 4 weeks.

=== Album ===
Chart performance for Ga Ga Ga Ga Ga
Chart (2007)	Peak position
Australian Albums (ARIA)	57
US Billboard 200	10
US Independent Albums (Billboard)	1

=== Singles ===
Chart performance for singles from Ga Ga Ga Ga Ga
Year	Song	Chart	Position
2007	"The Underdog"	US Modern Rock Tracks	26
2008	"Don't You Evah"	US Modern Rock Tracks	33

The song "You Got Yr. Cherry Bomb" was ranked number 16 on Rolling Stone's list of the 100 Best Songs of 2007.
