= The Soft Pack =

American indie rock band

- Also known as: The Muslims
- Origin: San Diego, United States
- Genres: Indie rock, post-punk revival, garage rock
- Years active: 2007–2014
- Labels: Kemado, Heavenly Recordings, Mexican Summer
- Past members: Matt Lamkin; Matty McLoughlin; David Lantzman; Brian Hill
- Website: Official MySpace

The Soft Pack was an indie rock band from San Diego, California, United States.

== History ==
The band was originally named the Muslims, but changed the name due to "ignorant and racist" comments. Matt Lamkin has stated Soft Pack can describe the band as being well mannered or it can refer to a device that when worn is intended to convince others that the wearer has a penis. The band formed in San Diego but are now based in Los Angeles.

Having released records through labels such as 1928 Recordings, Sweet Tooth Records, Caspian Records and I Hate Rock n' Roll, the band is currently signed to Kemado Records.

The band has signed a deal with Heavenly Recordings/Cooperative Music. The band released their debut full-length album, The Soft Pack, on Kemado Records on February 26, 2010. It was produced by Eli Janney and recorded in Brooklyn, New York, at Saltlands Studio.

The band's single "Answer to Yourself" was the final song streamed on WOXY.com before its sudden shutdown on March 23, 2010. The song is also included in the video game Grand Theft Auto V on the in-game radio station Vinewood Boulevard Radio. Since August 2010 it is also used for the commercial of the Dutch beer brand Grolsch.

On June 8, 2010, the indie rock band Nada Surf released a cover of the Soft Pack's "Bright Side" on their all-covers album If I Had a Hi-Fi.

The band's second album, Strapped, was released on Mexican Summer on August 17, 2012. The band performed "Answer to Yourself" on The Late Show with David Letterman, dedicating their performance to the late Warren Zevon.

On August 26, 2016, the band's frontman Matt Lamkin released his solo album on BigMono Rekords, titled Where I'm Matt. Matty McLoughlin, guitarist for the band, releases material under the name US Underground. It is currently unclear whether or not the Soft Pack will continue making music together, however, the band is occasionally active through its social media accounts.

== Band members ==
- Matt Lamkin - vocals, guitar
- Matty McLoughlin - guitar
- David Lantzman - bass guitar
- Brian Hill - drums

=== Albums ===
- The Soft Pack (February 2, 2010, Kemado)
- Strapped (September 25, 2012, Mexican Summer)

=== Singles ===
- "Parasites"/"Walking With Jesus" (2008, I Hate Rock n' Roll) as the Muslims
- "Extinction" (2008, Sweet Tooth) as the Muslims
- "Nightlife" (2008, Caspian)
- "Answer to Yourself" (2009, Kemado)
- "Gagdad" (2010, Mexican Summer)
- "Saratoga" (2012, Mexican Summer)

=== EPs ===
- The Muslims (2008, 1928 Recordings) as the Muslims
- Extinction (2009, Merok)
