= Strapped (album) =

Studio album by The Soft Pack
- Released: September 25, 2012
- Studio: Kingsize Soundlabs (Los Angeles, CA); Comp-ny (Glendale, CA); Rollercoaster Recording (Burbank, CA)
- Genre: Indie rock
- Length: 36:48
- Label: Mexican Summer
- Producer: The Soft Pack

The Soft Pack chronology
The Soft Pack (2010)	Strapped (2012)

Strapped is the second full-length studio album by American indie rock band The Soft Pack. It was released on September 25, 2012, through Mexican Summer. Recording sessions took place at Kingsize Soundlabs, Comp-ny and Rollercoaster Recording in California. Production was handled by the Soft Pack themselves, except for the song "Bobby Brown", which was co-produced by Rob Barbato. The album debuted at number 27 on the US Heatseekers Albums chart.

== Critical reception ==
Professional ratings
Aggregate scores
Source	Rating
AnyDecentMusic?	6.8/10
Metacritic	69/100
Review scores
Source	Rating
AllMusic	3.5/5 stars
Beats Per Minute	70/100%
Consequence of Sound	C+
DIY	4/5 stars
musicOMH	3/5 stars
NME	3.5/5 stars
Paste	6.8/10
Pitchfork	6.8/10
PopMatters	5/10
The Line of Best Fit	7.5/10

Strapped was met with generally favourable reviews from music critics. At Metacritic, which assigns a normalized rating out of 100 to reviews from mainstream publications, the album received an average score of 69, based on twenty reviews. The aggregator AnyDecentMusic? has the critical consensus of the album at a 6.8 out of 10, based on sixteen reviews.

Martyn Young of DIY called the album "a significant step forward from their debut; far more expansive and ambitious". Thomas Hannan of The Line of Best Fit wrote: "as with each of their records, it follows the pattern of having two numbers which will be your absolute favourites, despite the rest of it still ranging from passable to very good". AllMusic's Heather Phares found it "isn't a bad album so much as a strangely scattered one, revealing the Soft Pack caught between delivering what they're known for and what they might like to become". Brendan Frank of Beats Per Minute wrote: "The Soft Pack's knack for a no-tassels hook is what ends up making Strapped worthwhile, and it works best when they tighten the screws and keep it concise". Chris Coplan of Consequence stated: "they may still be a work in progress, but that progress thus far is demonstrative of an increasingly innovative band, one working too hard to slump". Jamie Fullerton of NME wrote: "uncomplicated, Spinto Band-ish jangles like 'Second Look', 'Tallboy' and 'Everything I Know' plough casually and happily along without a care in the world, very much like the band themselves". Rachel Bailey of Paste concluded that the album "isn't groundbreaking, especially by the standards The Soft Pack have set for themselves". Aaron Leitko of Pitchfork resumed: "long and lush isn't a bad look for the Soft Pack, so long as they're keeping the beat".

In mixed reviews, Andy Baber of musicOMH stated: "it is a straightforward and solid return from a band who sound unsure whether to stick or twist". Matthew Fiander of PopMatters called it "an album that seems to both highlight the Soft Pack's strengths and glaringly reveal their limitations to this point".

== Track listing ==
No.	Title	Writer(s)	Length
1.	"Saratoga"	Matt Lamkin; Matty McLoughlin; David Lantzman; Brian Hill	2:36
2.	"Second Look"	Lamkin; McLoughlin	2:48
3.	"They Say"	Lamkin; Lantzman; Hill	2:25
4.	"Tallboy"	Lamkin; McLoughlin; Lantzman; Hill	2:56
5.	"Bobby Brown"	Lamkin; McLoughlin; Lantzman; Hill	3:51
6.	"Chinatown"	Lamkin; McLoughlin	2:45
7.	"Ray's Mistake"	Lamkin; McLoughlin	2:54
8.	"Oxford Ave."	Lamkin; McLoughlin; Hill	2:04
9.	"Everything I Know"	Lamkin	2:37
10.	"Head On Ice"	Lamkin	2:04
11.	"Bound to Fall"	Lamkin	3:06
12.	"Captain Ace"	Lamkin; McLoughlin	6:42
Total length:			36:48

== Personnel ==
- Matt Lamkin – vocals, guitar, keyboards, recording (track 11), artwork
- Matty McLoughlin – guitar
- Dave Lantzman – guitar, keyboards, bass, photography
- Brian Hill – drums, percussion, photography
- Aaron Hestor – saxophone (track 2)
- Tony Bevilacqua – saxophone (tracks: 5, 8–10, 12)
- Will Canzoneri – keyboards (tracks: 7, 8, 12)
- Rob Barbato – co-producer & recording (track 5)
- Drew Fischer – recording (tracks: 1–3, 6–10, 12), mixing (track 8)
- David Newton – recording (track 4)
- Lars Stalfors – mixing (tracks: 1–7, 9–12)
- Pete Lyman – mastering
- Arlette Kotchounian – photography
- Claire Acosta – photography
- Hawley Wright – artwork
- Andrew Miller – layout
- Rob Carmichael – layout assistant

== Charts ==
Chart (2012)	Peak position
US Heatseekers Albums (Billboard)	27
