= The Natural History (EP) =

EP by The Natural History
- Released: 2002
- Genre: Indie rock
- Length: 13:53
- Label: Startime International

The Natural History chronology
The Natural History (2002)	Beat Beat Heartbeat (2003)

Professional ratings
Review scores
Source	Rating
Allmusic	link

The Natural History was The Natural History's first recording with Startime International on April 6–7, 2002, which was released later that year.

== Track listing ==
1. "Telling Lies Will Get You No Where" – 2:49
2. "The Progress Chart" – 3:13
3. "So He'll Say" – 3:08
4. "The Right Hand" – 2:58
5. "Broken Language" – 1:45

== Reviews ==
- https://www.allmusic.com/album/r596309 Allmusic review
