= Ben Culwell =

American painter

Photograph taken of Ben Culwell during his World War II service aboard the USS Pensacola

Ben L. Culwell (September 8, 1918 – 1992) was an American painter and early participant in the abstract expressionist movement. He is most widely known for his participation in the Museum of Modern Art's 1946 Fourteen Americans exhibition. His work is included in the permanent collection of Houston's Menil Collection, the Dallas Museum of Art, the Houston Museum of Fine Arts, as well as the Museum of Modern Art in New York City. In 1977, Culwell's work was featured in a retrospective at the McNay Art Museum. Ten years later in 1987, Culwell's early paintings were featured in Adrenalin Hour, an exhibition given at the opening of the Menil Collection, to critical acclaim. In 2007, his work was included in an exhibition at Baylor University, Texas Modern: The Rediscovery of Early Texas Abstraction 1935–1965.

== Life ==
=== Early life and family ===
Culwell was born in San Antonio, Texas in 1918, the eldest of three boys. Culwell's father was a businessman who suffered great losses during the Depression, forcing the Culwell family to move from city to city during the 1930s. Culwell spent his early years in Houston, and his last year and a half in high school in Dallas. Though Culwell felt an early calling to pursue art, this was in conflict with his father, who wanted his son to pursue a practical career in business.

When his father took a job in New York City in 1936, the family followed him to the east coast and Culwell enrolled at Columbia University. Though Culwell worked at Columbia towards a degree in business administration, he also took a number of art courses and studied under Walter Pach, who took him and other students to various private collections of modern art in the city. In that year, Culwell also attended a number of seminal shows in the history of modern art: Fantastic Art, Dada and Suurealism and Cubism and Abstract Art at MoMA, as well as the first exhibition of works by the American Abstract Artists Group. Culwell formed a number of friendships with New York avant-garde artists, and maintained contact with them throughout his life. However, Culwell found the New York Scene bohemian and escapist; combined with pressure from his father, this led him to choose a business career in Texas over continuing in the New York art world—this, he felt, would give him deeper insight into American life and would not preclude a serious pursuit of art. Culwell returned with his family to Dallas in 1938, where he entered business school.

In Dallas, Culwell continued to paint and keep in touch with the New York avant-garde, while also forming a number of ties to prominent Texas regionalist artists like Everett Spruce and Jerry Bywaters. In 1941, Culwell enlisted in the U.S Navy, and boarded a transport ship headed towards Pearl Harbor, arriving shortly after the Japanese bombing. From Pearl Harbor, he boarded the USS Pensacola, where he served from January 1942 until 1944.

Culwell's first creative burst occurred during his years on the Pacific front in World War II. Restricted to the only materials obtainable, Culwell painted at every moment he could, usually daily. Small watercolor, ink, and mixed media works on paper, each of Culwell's war paintings deals with an aspect of his life as a sailor. There are scenes of battle, scenes depicting the routine and frustration of a sailor's day-to-day life, and scenes of death (a constant wartime preoccupation). As Walter Hopps described the war painting in his catalogue essay for Culwell's Adrenalin Hour show at the Menil: "From the point of view of human content, these works, often including poetic diaristic inscriptions and made under the extremities of human endurance during the Pacific, are among our most powerful images of the horror of modern war."

Culwell managed to get off the ship around 1944 and traveled to Dallas on a thirty-day leave, before leaving for mid-shipman's school in upstate New York. He showed his suite of watercolors to Jerry Bywaters, the noted regional artist and then-director of the Dallas Museum of Art. Bywaters was interested in presenting the war paintings in a one-man show, and had Culwell mat between thirty and forty works and leave them in Dallas. These works, curated by Bywaters, appeared in a one-man show at the Dallas Museum around 1946, where the Museum of Modern Art's Dorothy Canning Miller saw them.

=== Fourteen Americans ===
Fourteen Americans went up once Culwell was living in Dallas. Culwell's work appeared in the show alongside such later well-established artists as Robert Motherwell, Isamu Noguchi, Arshile Gorky, and Mark Tobey, opened in the September 1946 at the Museum of Modern Art. Curated by Dorothy Canning Miller, Fourteen Americans was one of six Americans shows that introduced a range of artists to the museum's visitors. As opposed to the more common large group shows with this aim, Miller introduced a format with fewer artists and more works by each, thus allowing a more intimate engagement with the oeuvre of each painter and sculptor. Fourteen Americans, like the other shows in MoMA's special exhibitions and the Americans series was part of MoMA's attempts to introduce American artists to a public trained to appreciate European art. Though Culwell could not make the trip from Dallas at the time, his work impressed Robert Coates—famous for coining the term Abstract Expressionism—writing for The New Yorker:

I was especially impressed, for example, with the work of Ben L. Culwell, a young Texan just out of the Navy after nearly five years of active service in the Pacific, whose "Death by Burning," Death by Drowning," "Fragment of Concussion Time," and "Morning at Attu," among others—all combining Abstraction and Expressionism in a way that produces a maximum of emotional intensity—are among the few really integrated interpretations of wartime experience that I have yet to come across.

Fourteen Americans was one of the first shows to present Abstract Expressionism to a broader public. In fact, Coates' use of the phrase is one of the earlier combinations of the terms "Abstraction" and Expressionism" applied to the New York School (though Alfred Barr used the phrase as early as 1929 in reference to Kandinsky's paintings).

=== Life in Dallas ===
After the war, Culwell returned to Dallas, where he was living when Fourteen Americans went up. Despite critical recognition following Fourteen Americans, Culwell—living in Dallas—returned to the business world in July 1947, after no galleries showed any interest in his work (his only sales were two paintings bought by MoMA from the Fourteen Americans exhibition). over the year and a half that Culwell lived off military benefits and just painted, he did not make any money off his art. Culwell returned to the fire and casualty insurance that employed him before the war. This was not the end of Culwell's artistic work. He continued to paint throughout his life. Later he recalled, "Everyone else was in the same boat; Pollock, De Kooning, Kline all had other jobs. ... They all ended up teaching somewhere, but I had a scent of the politics of academics. I went back into business because I thought I'd have more freedom and maybe just as much time to paint."

Thereafter Culwell maintained two careers, one in art and the other in business. In the late 1950s, Culwell worked as the Executive Vice President of Southwest General Insurance Co. in San Antonio, Texas. While living in San Antonio, Culwell was an active member of the San Antonio Men of Art Guild, a local arts organization and cooperative gallery. From 1954 to 1961, while working for another fire and casualty firm in Dallas, he helped organize the Dallas-Fort Worth Men of Art Guild, and became its first chairman. In 1961, Culwell moved with his wife Virginia and daughter Elizabeth to Temple, Texas, where he worked as the president of the American Desk Manufacturing Company.

The late 1950s and 60s brought new appreciation of Culwell's work. He began to win awards again at Texan art fairs—for example, the E.M. Dealey Top Purchase Prize, 29th Annual Dallas County Exhibition in 1958—and make more sales. Culwell also participated in the exhibition From the Executive's Easel in 1958, which toured through the United States and internationally for several years. In 1959 Culwell had several one-man shows at the San Antonio and Dallas-Fort Worth Men of Art Guilds; he sold a large number of works at the Dallas show.

The McNay Art Museum, in 1977, and the Temple Cultural Activities Center (1978 and 1989) held retrospectives of his work; and the Menil Collection, on the opening of its new building, exhibited a suite of Culwell's war paintings entitled Adrenalin Hour. Culwell worked as the Vice President of American Desk Manufacturing Company in Temple, Texas before finally retiring from business in 1974. He worked on unfinished paintings until his death in 1992.

== Work ==
=== War paintings ===
Ben Culwell, Living Among Torpedoes (Picture of my consciousness during operations at "Torpedo Junction" in Sept. 1942) 1942–1944. Mimeograph on paper. 8 5/8 in × 6 1/4 in (220 mm × 160 mm).

Ben Culwell, Adrenalin Hour. 1942. Pencil, ink, tempera with egg white on paper. 11 1/2 by 9 1/2 inches (290 mm × 240 mm). Inscription by the artist: Our Closeness of Life to Death, Perhaps the Closest. Perhaps there are worse ways of dying than in that super conscious stratum of seeing-red rage: half-crying, half-god soar of strength, endurance, and selflessness. Herein are the only (and too few) medals earned.

According to Joan Seeman Robinson, Culwell treated different subjects with different techniques in his war paintings. For example, Culwell's painting Adrenalin Hour, like other of his battle scenes, is rendered in gestural brushstrokes. Painted over frantic scribblings, the brushstrokes show a single face painted in fluid and watery lines. Culwell painted the face over a background of violent red and blue splotches, with sketchy depictions of a scene—probably a battle scene—but the exact subject is unclear. In Living with Torpedoes and other paintings of leisure time however, Culwell's technique relied on thin contour lines and more narrative-oriented description. Culwell rendered a multitude of downtime activities—listening to records, thinking about women, standing on deck, and painting at a desk above a sleeping torpedo—in thin inked contour lines. The greater detail given by ink and pen allowed Culwell to express a greater range of activities. The comparison of Living with Torpedoes and Adrenalin Hour speaks to Culwell's habit of changing techniques based on the psychological state he was trying to depict.

In his war paintings, Culwell continued to work with ideas inspired by twentieth-century art movements, ideas that he began engaging with in New York and his time in Dallas during the late 1930s. Culwell's interest in complex and shifting depictions of space emerged from his interest in Cubism, while his attempt to render psychological states is an engagement with Surrealism's exploration of the human psyche. Tantamount, however, is Culwell's individual approach to Expressionism, as Dan Wingren noted in 1977:

Looking back on those paintings [war paintings], Culwell today believes that "the abstraction was not 'Pure Abstraction' in any of them while the purpose of all of them was purely Expressionistic." Culwell uses his words with care. To him, to "express" is to "ex-press" to press-out. His "expressions" are not lax or negligent jottings, but they require (of him and the viewer) straining and concentrated intensity."

=== Post-war work ===
Ben Culwell, Now #2, 1960–63. Oil and glass fragments on board. 30 by 36 inches (760 mm × 910 mm).

The mainstay of Culwell's postwar work is his continuing development of a dramatic and painterly abstract surface with daring and occasionally garish gesture, color, and texture. Similarly important are Culwell's development of contrasting approaches to abstraction, through combining geometric and grid-like structures with hectic organic gesture and heavy texture.

==== Texture and media ====
Culwell also began revisiting the few oil paintings done before the war, scraping away at the canvases before painting over them again. This reworking became a major part of Culwell's artistic process for the rest of his life, where he constructed, destroyed, and then reconstructed—before destroying and recreating again. At times certain panels disintegrated from the violence of this cycle—these Culwell termed "residues"—the surviving or finished paintings were, in Culwell's words, "alluviums of other paintings accreted on the same panels over a number of years". The final surface, produced in some cases after years of this process, not only exists in and of itself, but is the result of layers of buried images.

Culwell's concern with surface and texture remained constant throughout his post-war work. Working with oil paints on canvas or wood surfaces that allowed him to apply paint thickly, Culwell began moving away from the thinner surfaces of his war paintings. Soon Culwell began increasing the textural emphasis by adding sand or broken glass to the paint. Later he began experimenting with Duco automobile lacquer—a viscous liquid that can be poured, brushed or scraped on the painting surface with a trowel, leaving a distinctive linear track—either with oil paints or on its own. Duco, like oil, holds foreign objects well, a property that Culwell exploited to the fullest by including communicative articles like mirrors, doorknobs, spectacles, beads, wires.

Thus, Culwell's constant reworking and repainting of each canvas, as well as his building up of textures and materials speaks to Culwell's desire to include rather than purify—a different approach from some of the more mainstream Abstract Expressionists. Instead of distilling form to a single yet universal gesture, as many New York Abstract Expressionists attempted, Culwell attempted to signify universal meaning by loading metaphors and references atop each other.

Culwell's interest in texture led him to experiment radically with material properties—often he combined oil paint, commercial oil enamel, and Duco on a single canvas. Duco and oil paint are not wholly compatible, which frequently led to the curdling and wrinkling of the paint surface—an effect that pleased Culwell, who took this property to extremes in the 1950–54 Roof series. Completed while Culwell lived in San Antonio, Texas, the Roof series consists of paintings that Culwell set to dry on the roof of his home. He found, during his experiments with Duco, that the paint emits noxious fumes while drying, which led him to place the paintings on the roof. This exposed the work to the sun and other elements, which allowed the dense accretion characteristic of earlier works but did not take the amount of intense labor and time.

==== Iconography ====
Culwell used a large and complex pictorial vocabulary in his work, drawing on universal symbols like faces, roots, and stars to suggest cosmic balance. Culwell's interest in balance and synthesis emerged as early as his war paintings, as he noted in his artist's statement for Fourteen Americans:

These war paintings were executed almost in entirety aboard ship during 1944. Previous quick sketches done in direct but unstable reaction were finished at that time. By that, the third consecutive year of combat duty, I had reached the positive balance requisite to creative statement. I had completed my personal readjustment. Then, as the stimuli recurred from day to day in the well-known cycle of battle, routine, battle, I set down relationships of the life which I was in, in the full perspective afforded by the simultaneous viewpoints of assimilated familiarity and fresh impression. ...

The general nature of the use I try to make of the art of painting is, I hope, apparent; that is, to express the sum of relationships which is a total human being. With art, as with atomic physics, the problem in the world today is to bring the human being abreast of the techniques and inventions of material culture—to achieve an adequate modern spiritual integrity.

According to Dan Wingren, a fellow Texan artist writing on Culwell's work in the 1970s, Culwell uses these symbols to suggest formal and spatial relationships:

The principal elements of Culwell's pictorial vocabulary are virtually constant, and were present in the wartime paintings. It is an iconography of power-centers and relationships. Natural energies are suggested by stars, rivers, and flamelike shapes. These are often contrasted with less animated blocks and masses. Organic energies are suggested by cellular forms, biomorphic shapes, and close approximations to heads, hands, roots, and leaves. These elements are subordinate, however, to the formal aspect of his art. He knew about Clive Bell's theory of "significant form" as early as 1937, and has consistently used his formal means to create what he calls "modern space". He eschews the tricks of linear perspective or opaque overlap to create the impression of space. Rather, his image is primarily a surface, often dense and heavily encrusted with paint, so much so that it might give off the aura of danger (do not touch!), and this surface, overwhelmingly singular, a distinct entity in the surrounding universe, becomes its own universe. One can look into it and find his iconographical elements heaving and dividing in their own gravitational relationships. The impression of space generated this way can be exceedingly strong.

In this way, each of Culwell's symbols hold multiple levels of meaning, and are juxtaposed with or painted on top of other similarly charged images. These meanings change over time as well, both for the owner of the painting and its painter (Culwell's signatures in all four corners of each painting allow the owner to rotate the painting and bring new sets of perceptions to each position.

For example, Culwell's Now # 2 (1960–1963) combines areas of lines and flat planes rendered in hard-edged patterns. These geometric shapes abut areas filled with glass fragments in the lower register, while the upper part of the picture plane consists of poured paints of different colors, in an organic and almost marble-like swath. Wingren, writing on Now #1, states that the sharp divisions of the painting—between areas with radically different materials and techniques of placing paint—initially appear traumatic, suggesting fractures and gashes across the picture plane. According to Wingren, however, Culwell does not allow the painting to lose its compositional integrity; there is a rhythm to the shapes across the picture plane.

These geometric shapes suggest grids, electronics, switchboards, scaffolding, and industrial architecture. According to Wingren, these geometric shapes suggest the rational and the scientific, and, in terms of Culwell's personal life, business. Thus, the Now series of paintings—with their titles indicating an immediate state in the painter's life, as he paints—offers Culwell's artistic reconciliation of the two halves of his life: the business side and the artistic side.

== Legacy and critical opinion ==
Due to his participation in Fourteen Americans as well as his lifelong connections to New York artists, Ben Culwell is one of three Texan artists that played a role in the development of Abstract Expressionism (the other two are Forrest Bess and Joseph Glasco).

By historical and personal associations, Culwell belongs to the generation of abstract expressionism, but the combination of his vision and his regional background separates him from his contemporaries. The abstract expressionists, centered in New York City, singled out gesture, sought the large scale, and reduced figure and form to abstract brushwork. Culwell sought images, concentrated on small surfaces and insisted on symbolic, even literary subjects and elements. But Culwell was also far too experimental in both concept and technique to be comfortable with (or accepted by the Texas regionalists.

In the years after the war in Texas, Culwell saw little interest in his work. He made few sales and local critics panned his work. Though he had one-man shows at the San Antonio and Dallas-Fort Worth Men of Art Guilds and a 1977 retrospective at the McNay, it was not until his 1987 show Adrenalin Hour that critics and artists came to see Culwell as a pioneering Abstract Expressionist. As Mark L. Smith, in his 2007 essay "Minimal Remnant: Early Abstract and Non-Objective Painting in Texas," wrote of Culwell's 1947 painting Texan:

At this extremely early date in the history of modern art In Texas, Culwell pushed abstraction all the way to non-objectivity and then pushed some more until he reached objectness. Texan is so sculptural that it is tantamount to a prediction of Robert Rauschenberg's "combines" of the early 1950s, which combined painting and sculpture. Culwell's thick slab of studio accretions includes massively thick impasto, glass shards, pebbles, auto paint, drips, scrapes, abrasions and lines carved through wet paint. It is a near-chaotic jumble of bold color and aggressive texture; only the hint of a center spine of scaffolding (Cubism, again) holds this wonderfully messy concoction together. This "Texan" is post-World War II à la twenty-first century Tokyo. One can almost hear the cacophony of urban sounds; it is noisy jazz as John Cage would have done it, with the clanks and roars and screeches and horns and sirens of the modern city.

== List of selected exhibitions ==
- Museum of Modern Art, Fourteen Americans, 1946
- Theater '51, 1951
- Dallas-Fort Worth Men of Art Guild Galley, solo show, 1959
- McNay Art Institute, Retrospective, 1977
- Menil Collection, Adrenalin Hour, 1987
- Menil Collection, Texas Art, 1988
- Cultural Activities Center, Temple, Texas, Ben L. Culwell: Retrospective (Paintings from 1946 to 1989), 1989, catalogue essay by Donald Kuspit
- Museum of Fine Arts, Houston, Texas, 150 Works from Museum of Fine Arts, Houston, 2000
- Martin Museum of Art, Baylor University, Texas Modern: The Rediscovery of Early Texas Abstraction (1935–1965), 2007

== Bibliography ==
- Askew, Rual. "Culwell Wins Dealey Prize In 29th Dallas County Show." Dallas Morning News (June 19, 1958). Art & Artists.
- ---. "Annual Survey Has Its Ups and Downs." Dallas Morning News (June 29, 1958). Art & Artists.
- ---. "Housing Problem Solved." Dallas Morning News (May 12, 1957). Art & Artists.
- Barr, Alfred H., Jr. and Sculpture in the Museum of Modern Art, 1929–1967. New York: Museum of Modern Art, 1977.
- Chadwick, Susan. Abstract Expressionist's WWII images evocative," The Houston Post July 12, 1987.
- Coates, Robert. "All-American." The New Yorker (September 26, 1941).
- Culwell, Ben. Adrenalin Hour. essay by Walter Hopps. Houston: The Menil Collection, 1987.
- ---. Ben L. Culwell: Retrospective (Paintings from 1946 to 1989). essay by Donald Kuspit. Temple, Texas: Cultural Activities Center, 1989. An exhibition catalogue.
- Edwards, Katie Robinson, Jim Edwards, and Mark L. Smith, contributors. Texas Modern: The Rediscovery of Early Texas Abstraction (1935–1965). Austin, Texas: Texas Art Books, 2007. Catalogue for the exhibition at the Martin Museum of Art, Baylor University.
- Goddard, Dan. "Culwell's war art is vivid, haunting," San Antonio Express-News May 14, 1989. Sunday edition.
- Goetzmann, William H., with contributions by Becky Duval Reese. Texas Images and Visions. Austin, Texas: University of Texas Press, 1983. A catalogue published in conjunction with the exhibition Images of Texas at the Archer M. Huntington Gallery.
- Jones, Peggy Louise. "Ben Culwell, Delabano Pace Show." Dallas Morning News (1951). Art and Artists.
- ---. "Art and Artists: Few Moderns Never Static In Their Work," Dallas Morning News (December 21, 1947).
- Johnson, Patricia C. "What's New at the Menil," Houston Chronicle (September 19, 2004). Zest section.
- ---. "'Texas Art' show offers 4 decades of creative works." Houston Chronicle (March 5, 1988), Houston section.
- ---. "An unknown Texan in the Menil," Houston Chronicle June 14, 1987.
- Kuspit, Donald." Review of Ben L. Culwell, "Adrenalin Hour" Houston, Menil Collection" Artforum XXVI, no. 6 (February 1988).
- Miller, Dorothy Canning. Fourteen Americans. New York: Museum of Modern Art, 1946. An exhibition catalogue.
- Minick, Joe. "Culwell Exhibit On View." Dallas Times Herald (April 1, 1959). Art notes.
- Robinson, Joan Seeman . "Ben L. Culwell: Adrenalin Hour," The Tyler Museum of Art Review Tyler, Texas, (December 1988-January 1989): 6-7.
- Tiemann, Robert. "Painter Culwell's best asset is color." San Antonio Express. (October 6, 1977). Art review.
- Tyson, Janet. "Rare energy and turmoil mark work: A retrospective now on view in Temple looks at the art of Ben Culwell, one of the first Texas expressionists after World War II," Fort Worth Star-Telegram (September 30, 1989). Lifestyle/Entertainment section.
- Wingren, Dan, "Ben L. Culwell: An Introduction," in Paintings by Ben L. Culwell. San Antonio, Texas: Marion Koogler McNay Art Institute, 1977. An exhibition catalogue.
- ---. "Ben Culwell," in Ben Culwell. Houston, Texas: Meredith Long & Company, 1977. An exhibition pamphlet.
