= The Underdog (song) =

2007 single by Spoon

Single by Spoon

from the album Ga Ga Ga Ga Ga
- B-side: "Bring It On Home to Me"
- Released: July 5, 2007
- Recorded: 2006–2007
- Genre: Indie rock; indie pop; indie folk
- Length: 3:42
- Label: Merge; ANTI-
- Songwriter: Britt Daniel
- Producers: Jon Brion; Spoon

Spoon singles chronology
"Sister Jack" (2005)	"The Underdog" (2007)	"You Got Yr. Cherry Bomb" (2007)

"The Underdog" is a song by indie rock band Spoon. It was released as the lead single from their sixth studio album, Ga Ga Ga Ga Ga (2007), on July 5, 2007. The song was written by frontman Britt Daniel and produced by Jon Brion along with the band. The song reached No. 26 on the Billboard Alternative Songs chart.

The band performed the song on the October 6, 2007, episode of the 33rd season of Saturday Night Live. It was featured in the 2008 film Cloverfield, the 2009 films I Love You, Man and 17 Again, in the opening and ending scene of the 2011 film Horrible Bosses, and in the 2017 film Spider-Man: Homecoming. A music video for the song was directed by Keven McAllester.

== Chart positions ==
Chart (2007)	Peak position
US Adult Alternative Airplay (Billboard)	3
US Alternative Airplay (Billboard)	26
