= Beat Beat Heartbeat =

Studio album by The Natural History
- Released: 2003
- Genre: Indie rock
- Length: 27:36
- Label: Startime International

The Natural History chronology
The Natural History (2002)	Beat Beat Heartbeat (2003)	People That I Meet (2007)

Professional ratings
Review scores
Source	Rating
Allmusic	HERE
Pitchfork Media	(7.8/10) HERE

Beat Beat Heartbeat was the first full-length album released by The Natural History on May 20, 2003.

== Track listing ==
1. "Facts Are" – 2:33
2. "Watch This House" – 1:43
3. "The Right Hand" – 2:58
4. "It's a Law" – 1:46
5. "Broken Language" – 1:45
6. "Beat Beat" – 2:49
7. "Run de Run" – 2:43
8. "Do What You Should" – 1:49
9. "Hours from My Life" – 3:06
10. "Telling Lies Will Get You Nowhere" – 2:43
11. "Dance Steps" – 3:41

== Video ==
- "Watch This House"

== Reviews ==
- PopMatters review
- PunkNews review
- Pitchfork Media review
