= Ugo Mulas =

Italian photographer (1928–1973)

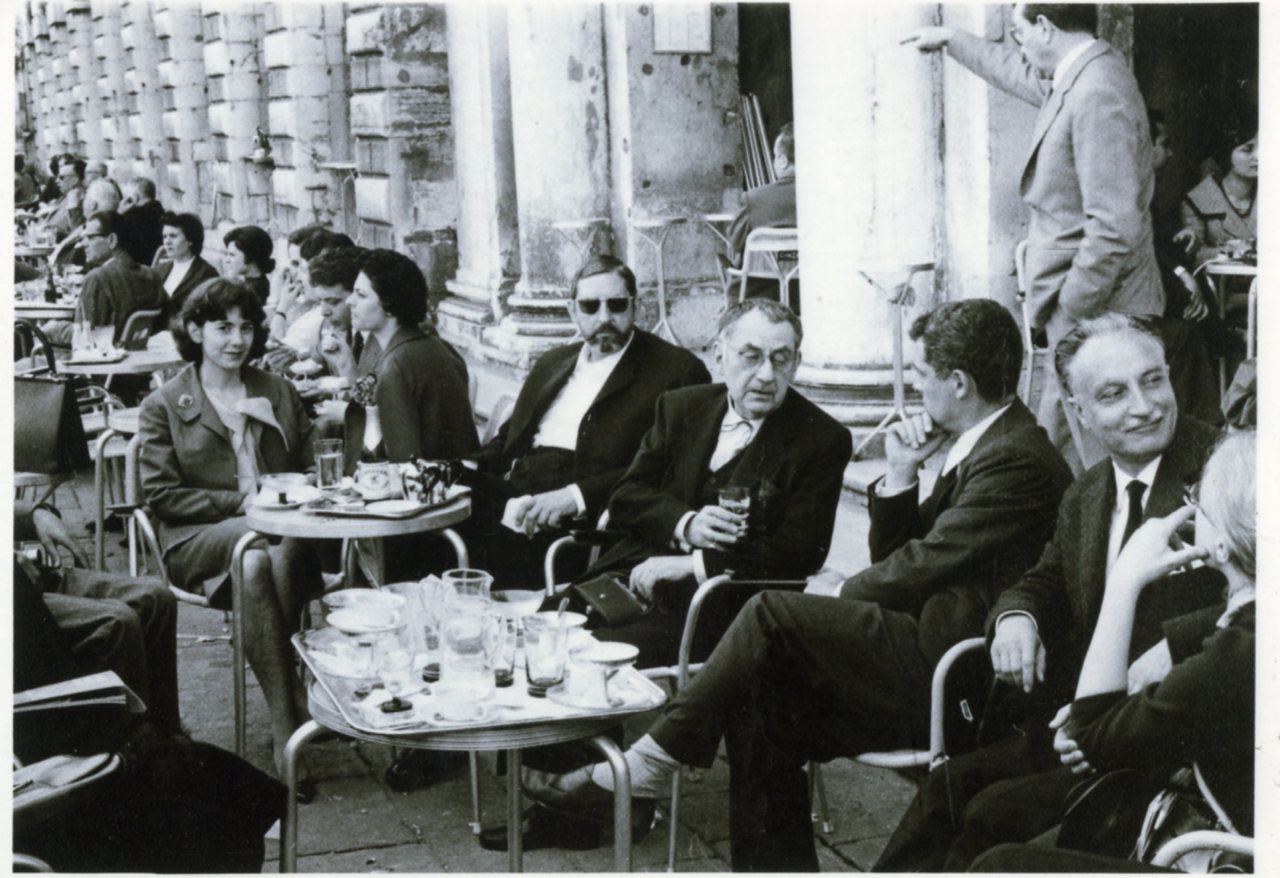
Mulas (in profile) between Man Ray and Paolo Monti

Ugo Mulas (28 August 1928 – 2 March 1973) was an Italian photographer noted for his portraits of artists and his street photography.

== Life and work ==
Ugo Mulas was born on August 28, 1928, in Pozzolengo, province of Brescia. He began his studies in law in 1948 in Milan, but left to take art courses at the Brera Fine Arts Academy. Soon, he started shooting reports on life of Milan's suburbs. Upon joining the regulars at the legendary "Jamaica" bar, he became part of the art and fashion community. In 1954 he was asked to cover the Venice Biennale, his first professional assignment. He went on to photograph every Venice Biennale through 1972 and to document his work in an art book. Mulas worked for such Italian publications as Settimo Giorno, Rivista Pirelli, Domus, Vogue.

Mulas also did commercial work for advertising campaigns including clients such as Pirelli and Olivetti. In 1959 in Florence, he discovered Veruschka who later became a well-known model and artist. While covering the Spoleto Festival in 1962, he befriended sculptor Alexander Calder, who later became a major subject of Mulas' photography and writings.

While photographing the 1964 Venice Biennale, Mulas met several American artists, art critics, and the art dealer Leo Castelli. This meeting led to his travel to New York City and his documentation of the Pop art scene. This trip to New York and Mulas' resulting book and exhibits, New York, the New Art Scene became his best known work. The exhibit included enlargements of Mulas' contact sheets and environmental portraits of Robert Rauschenberg, Jasper Johns, Barnett Newman and Roy Lichtenstein. In the 1960s, he also worked in graphic design and wrote art books.

In the late 1960s, Mulas became interested in theater and worked on many productions at Milan's Piccola Scala Theater and Teatro Comunale di Bologna. His photography of that period was full of experiments, in the shootings of that time he "played" with the composition, plot, framing, looking for a new artistic language. Mulas was described by his contemporaries as a man who, through photography, tried to understand the depths of human souls.

In 1970, Mulas started working on the series La Verifiche that turned out to be his last — he was diagnosed with cancer in the same year. In early 1973, Mulas released his last book La Photographie, where he collected and summed up all his ideas and thoughts on art and photography. Aged 45, Mulas died in Milan on March 2, 1973.

== Legacy ==
The American indie rock band Spoon chose Mulas' 1963 portrait of American sculptor Lee Bontecou for their 2007 studio album Ga Ga Ga Ga Ga.

== Publications ==
- New York; the new art scene. Holt, Rinehart and Winston, 1967.
- David Smith in Italy. By David Smith and Mulas. Charta, 1997. ISBN 88-8158-024-1.
- Vent'anni di Biennale, 1954–1972. Mondadori, 1988. ISBN 88-04-31254-8.
- Calder. By Mulas and H. Harvard Arnason. Studio, 1971. ISBN 0-670-11219-4.
- Calder. By Mulas. Milan: Officina Libraria, 2008. ISBN 978-88-89854-21-1.

== General references ==
- Ugo Mulas. By Germano Celant. Federico Motta Editore, 1993. ISBN 88-7179-002-2.
