= Lee Bontecou =

American sculptor and printmaker (1931–2022)

- Untitled, welded steel, canvas, black fabric, and wire, 1959
- Born: January 15, 1931; Providence, Rhode Island, U.S.
- Died: November 8, 2022 (aged 91); Florida, U.S.
- Education: Art Students League of New York
- Known for: Sculpture, Drawing, Printmaking
- Awards: Fulbright scholarship, Rome 1957–1958; Louis Comfort Tiffany Award, 1959

Lee Bontecou (January 15, 1931 – November 8, 2022) was an American sculptor and printmaker and a pioneer figure in the New York art world. She kept her work consistently in a recognizable style, and received broad recognition in the 1960s. Bontecou made abstract sculptures in the 1960s and 1970s and created vacuum-formed plastic fish, plants, and flower forms in the 1970s. Rich, organic shapes and powerful energy appear in her drawings, prints, and sculptures. Her work has been shown and collected in many major museums in the United States and in Europe.

== Early life and education ==
Bontecou was born in Providence, Rhode Island. She had an older brother, Hank. Her father was a salesman and was involved with the development of the aluminum canoe. Her mother wired submarine parts during WWII. As a little girl, Bontecou spent time at the family's cabin in Yarmouth, Nova Scotia, where she first experimented with sculpture, whittling animals out of wood. From the time Bontecou attended high school, she found herself focusing on sculpture; "I avoided everything that was commercial art. I avoided having to make posters, and I avoided all of these...it was just not interesting to me. But I was always drawing at home, and making little clay stuff and little figures, little – anything that I could get my hands on. And I did enjoy the clay."

Bontecou attended Bradford Junior College (which became Bradford College) in Haverhill, Massachusetts for her general education and then attended the Art Students League of New York from 1952 to 1955, where she studied with the sculptor William Zorach. She also spent the summer of 1954 at the Skowhegan School of Painting and Sculpture in Maine, where she learned to weld. She received a Fulbright scholarship from the U.S.-Italy Fulbright Commission to study in Rome in 1957-1958. In 1971, she began teaching at Brooklyn College.

Bontecou's work was deeply affected by WWII. Many of her sculptures were emotional responses to war. Describing her own work, Bontecou said "I was angry...all of those- all the ones with the teeth- it was a thing of what that war was." Both her parents joined the war effort. Her mother wired transmitters for submarine navigation and her father sold gliders for the military. Later her husband, Bill Giles, would be a medic in the Korean War.

== Career ==
Bontecou was best known for the sculptures she created in 1959 and the 1960s, which challenged artistic conventions of both materials and presentation by hanging on the wall. They consist of welded steel frames covered with recycled canvas and industrial materials (such as conveyor belts or mail sacks) and other found objects. Her best constructions are at once mechanistic and organic, abstract but evocative of the brutality of war. Art critic Arthur Danto described them as "fierce", reminiscent of 17th-century scientist Robert Hooke's Micrographia, lying "at the intersection of magnified insects, battle masks, and armored chariots...”. She was one of the first female artists to be exhibited at Leo Castelli's art gallery in the 1960s, alongside Jasper Johns, Frank Stella, and Robert Rauschenberg. One of the largest examples of her work is located in the lobby of the David H. Koch Theater at Lincoln Center for the Performing Arts in New York City, which was commissioned by the architect Philip Johnson. From the 1970s until 1991 she taught in the Art Department at Brooklyn College.

She continued to teach through the 1990s, while spending time in Pennsylvania. She moved to Orbisonia, Pennsylvania full-time in 1988 where she continued to work. There she maintained a vigorous studio practice, but showed infrequently. She was brought back to public attention by a 2003 retrospective co-organized by the Hammer Museum in Los Angeles and the Museum of Contemporary Art, Chicago, that traveled to the Museum of Modern Art in New York City in 2004. The retrospective included both work from her public, art-world career and an extensive display of work done after retreating from the public view. Bontecou's work was also included in the Carnegie International 2004-5 exhibit in Pittsburgh, Pennsylvania. In 2010, the Museum of Modern Art presented a retrospective of Bontecou's work entitled All Freedom in Every Sense. In 2014, her drawings were exhibited in Lee Bontecou: Drawn Worlds, organized by The Menil Collection, which traveled to the Princeton University Art Museum. Her work was also included in Revolution in the Making: Abstract Sculpture by Women, 1947-2016 at Hauser Wirth & Schimmel in 2016.

In 2017, a major exhibition of Bontecou's drawings and sculpture, including a site-specific installation entitled Sandbox, a collaboration between Bontecou and Joan Banach, was organized by the Gemeentemuseum Den Haag. The exhibition was curated by Joan Banach and Laura Stamps, and accompanied by a fully illustrated catalogue published by Hannibal (Dutch) and Koenig Books, London (English). The catalogue contains new essays on Lee Bontecou by Laura Stamps, Curator of Modern Art at The Gemeentemuseum, Joan Banach, and Jeremy Melius, with an introduction by Gemeentemuseum Director, Benno Tempel.

== Perspective ==
In the 1960s, Bontecou's work was hailed for its unique position in between painting and sculpture. Sculptor Donald Judd wrote that her work "asserts its own existence, form and power. It becomes an object in its own right." The openness, autonomy, and engineering processes central to her work, were embraced by the Feminist Art Movement in the 1970s and her use of cavities and holes has been read as female genitalia, and the related, central core imagery. It is an association the artist denied. Her work has been characterized by references to the synergy between nature and fiction, resulting naturalistically rendered creatures, with grotesquely morphed features.

== Techniques and materials ==
Bontecou worked with many materials, such as metal, paper, plastic, and fibreglass. She also worked with unconventional materials and discovered new techniques. In her drawings, she developed a process in the late 1950s of using an oxyacetylene torch to produce a carbon spray from the flame, resulting in an "airbrushed" look and deep saturated blacks that she took to her sculptural work.

== Personal life and death ==
Bontecou was married to the artist William Giles with whom she had a daughter, Valerie.

Bontecou died in Florida on November 8, 2022, at the age of 91.

== Legacy and recognition ==
In 1959, Bontecou received the Louis Comfort Tiffany Award. In 2004, she was elected into the National Academy of Design.

A picture of Bontecou working in her studio, taken by Italian photographer Ugo Mulas in 1963, was used as the cover art for Spoon’s 2007 album Ga Ga Ga Ga Ga. The apparently completed sculpture on the right in the aforementioned photograph is now in the collection of the Honolulu Museum of Art.

Bontecou's image is included in the iconic 1972 poster Some Living American Women Artists by Mary Beth Edelson.

== Public collections ==
Bontecou's work can be seen in a number of public institutions, including:

- Chazen Museum of Art
- Cleveland Museum of Art
- David H. Koch Theater (New York City)
- David Winton Bell Gallery at Brown University
- Glenstone
- Kunstmuseum Den Haag (The Hague)
- Herbert F. Johnson Museum of Art at Cornell University
- Honolulu Museum of Art
- Menil Collection
- Moderna Museet (Stockholm)
- Museum Boijmans Van Beuningen (Rotterdam)
- Museum of Contemporary Art, Chicago
- Museum of Fine Arts, Houston
- Museum of Modern Art
- National Gallery of Art
- Neue Nationalgalerie (Berlin)
- The Governor Nelson A. Rockefeller Empire State Plaza Art Collection (Albany, NY)
- Pennsylvania Academy of the Fine Arts
- The Richard M. Ross Art Museum (Delaware, OH)
- Smithsonian American Art Museum
- Stedelijk Museum Amsterdam
- University of Michigan Museum of Art
- Walker Art Center
- Whitney Museum of American Art

== Bibliography ==
- Applin, Jo (June 2006) "This threatening and possibly functioning object: Lee Bontecou and the Sculptural Void", Art History 29:3, pp. 476–503
- Banach, Joan (February 2017) "A Peripatetic Atlas of the Sandbox", Lee Bontecou, exhibition catalogue, Gemeentemuseum Den Haag. London: Koenig Books.
- Danto, Arthur (2004) "A Tribe Called Quest", The Nation, September 27, 2004, p. 40-43
- Dreishpoon, Douglas (1996) "From a curator's point of view: making selections and forging connections: Lee Bontecou, Eva Hesse, Donald Judd, Sol LeWitt, Brice Marden, Robert Morris, Robert Smithson / Douglas Dreishpoon", Weatherspoon Art Gallery, University of North Carolina at Greensboro,
- Molesworth, Helen Anne (2005) "Part Object Part Sculpture", Wexner Center for the Arts, The Ohio State University
- Smith, Elizabeth A.T.; Ann Philbin (2003). Lee Bontecou: A Retrospective. Dona De Salvo, Mona Hadler, Donald Judd, Robert Storr. Museum of Contemporary Art, Chicago with Harry N. Abrams Inc. ISBN 0-8109-4618-1.
- Krygier, Irit Career Interrupted on artnet
- Hadler, Mona (2007) "Lee Bontecou: Plastic Fish and Grinning Saw Blades," Woman’s Art Journal, Vol XXVIII, No. 1 (Spring/Summer, 2007), pp. 12–18
- Hadler, Mona (1994) "Lee Bontecou's 'Warnings'," Art Journal, Vol.LIII, No. 4(Winter,1994), pp. 56–61.
- Rosenberg, Karen. "Sketching When the Pencil Requires Ignition Lee Bontecou:Drawn Worlds an Artist's Other Side." The New York Times July 24, 2014: n. pag. Print.
