= Loren MacIver =

American painter

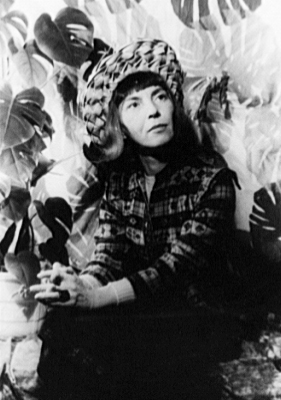
- portrait by Carl van Vechten
- Born: Mary Newman; February 2, 1909; New York City, New York
- Died: May 3, 1998 (aged 89); New York City, New York
- Occupation: Artist

Loren MacIver (February 2, 1909 – May 3, 1998) was an American painter and the first woman represented in the Museum of Modern Art's permanent collection.

== Personal life ==
Loren MacIver was born in New York in 1909. Her father, Charles Augustus Paul Newman, was a physician, and her mother was Julia McIvers, whose name she kept but modified. At ten years old, she would attend Saturday art classes at the Art Students League. She claimed that attending these classes for only one year was the only institutional learning she had received her whole career. In 1929 she married poet and critic Lloyd Frankenburg.

== Work ==
MacIver's work ranges from naturalistic to abstract, but consistent throughout her work is the skill with which she depicts light.

She first began showing her work in group exhibitions in a few galleries and art associations from 1933 to 1937. She worked for the Federal Art Project/Works Progress Administration (FAP/WPA). The director of the FAP/WPA, Holger Cahill, wrote of MacIver's work saying, "In its fusion of the interests of the world of fact and the world of feeling, Miss MacIver's work is richly imaginative, and delightful in its sensitive, personalized expression". She ripened in her personal artistic style. She explained her method in 1946: "Quite simple things can lead to discovery. This is what I would like to do with painting: starting with simple things to lead the eye by various manipulations of colors, objects and tensions toward a transformation and a reward". Her work was even shown in popular magazines like Fortune (1944) and Town & Country (1947). In 1947–48, she was given mural commission to decorate the first-class lounge of the S.S. Argentina luxury liner and the dining rooms of the American Export Lines ships. MacIver's work was highly praised during her life, in a New York Times article her method of incorporating French elements into her work was highlighted, "Miss MacIver, also an American who has lived for many years in France, is an artist in her own right and has been eminently capable of taking the French ingredients, assimilating and creating out of them a taste, a style, and at times, a vision all her own". In her later years by the 1970s, she had begun reinterpreting previous themes and her work was considered no longer innovative and the Pierre Matisse Gallery took her work down. After her husband's death in 1975, she painted little but did continue showing several of her pieces in art galleries. Then in 1998, the Tibor de Nagy Gallery hung its first exhibition of her work only months before her death. This is what I would like to do with painting: starting with simple things, to lead the eye by various manipulations of colors, objects and tensions toward a transformation and reward" by playing with simple aspects of paintings, she is able to encompass them all to create something that provokes the viewer to sense something new. In a New York Times article, her mastery of the foundations of art are highlighted, "Completely at home with pictorial haute cuisine, Miss MacIver has for some time been mixing up the soufflés and sauces béarnaise of futurism, sur realism and cubism, and adding more than a prodigious pinch of impressionism" MacIver is a master of her trade, and those around her were witness to it

MacIver is the first woman represented in the Museum of Modern Art's permanent collection, one of her works having been acquired by director Alfred H. Barr, Jr. in 1935.

MacIver's works are in the permanent collections of a number of institutions, including the Addison Gallery of American Art, Art Institute of Chicago, Baltimore Museum of Art, Brooklyn Museum, Hirshhorn Museum and Sculpture Garden, Los Angeles County Museum of Art, The Metropolitan Museum of Art, Museum of Contemporary Art, Chicago, The Museum of Modern Art, National Gallery of Art, Washington, D. C., Philadelphia Museum of Art, The Phillips Collection, San Francisco Museum of Modern Art, Walker Art Center, Whitney Museum of American Art, and Yale University Art Gallery.
