= Swimming (French Kicks album) =

Studio album by French Kicks
- Released: March 31, 2008
- Recorded: December 2007 at The Saltlands, Brooklyn, NY by Alex Pasco
- Genre: Indie rock, post-punk revival
- Length: 44:02
- Label: Vagrant Records
- Producer: French Kicks

French Kicks chronology
Two Thousand (2006)	Swimming (2008)

Professional ratings
Review scores
Source	Rating
AllMusic	3/5 stars
Billboard	Favorable
The Daily Mississippian	Favorable
IGN	Favorable
Nylon	Favorable
Pitchfork Media	7.6/10
PopMatters	5/10 stars
Spin	3.5/5 stars
The Village Voice	Favorable
The Washington Post	Favorable

Swimming is the fourth and final studio album by New York-based indie rock band French Kicks. Their first self-produced album, Swimming is more stripped down than is found on their previous albums. Explaining the recording process, guitarist Josh Wise said that the band "used a lot of first and second takes and tried to preserve a sense of immediacy and discovery that comes from putting things down before you really have a chance to think too hard." It was released on March 31, 2008, receiving overwhelmingly positive reviews.

== Track listing ==
1. "Abandon" – 3:56
2. "Over the World" – 4:26
3. "Carried Away" – 3:29
4. "New Man" – 4:38
5. "Said So What" – 4:16
6. "Atlanta" – 4:48
7. "Love in the Ruins" – 3:38
8. "With the Fishes" – 3:39
9. "The Way You Arrive" – 4:19
10. "All Our Weekends" – 4:03
11. "Sex Tourists" – 3:29
12. "This Could Go Wrong" – 3:42
