= Don't You Evah =

EP by Spoon
- Released: April 8, 2008
- Recorded: 2007–2008
- Genre: Indie rock
- Label: Merge Records
- Producer: Britt Daniel; Jim Eno

Spoon chronology
Ga Ga Ga Ga Ga (2007)	Don't You Evah (2008)	Got Nuffin (2009)

Professional ratings
Review scores
Source	Rating
Pitchfork Media	6.7/10

Don't You Evah is the fifth EP by the indie rock band Spoon. It was released on April 8, 2008, by Merge Records. It was released to promote the title track, the second single from their album Ga Ga Ga Ga Ga.

The EP includes the original version of the song performed by The Natural History, "Don't You Ever", along with Spoon's cover (entitled "Don't You Evah") and five remixes of "Don't You Evah" performed by various artists. The EP also contains a new Spoon song, "All I Got Is Me", which was recorded in 2007, but which was not included on Ga Ga Ga Ga Ga. The Diplo Mix was initially released as a digital single on December 11, 2007, with proceeds going to the Texas Criminal Justice Coalition.

== Track listing ==
1. "Don't You Evah" – 3:34
2. "All I Got Is Me" – 3:26
3. "Don't You Evah" (Ted Leo's I Want It Hotter remix) – 4:00
4. "Don't You Evah" (Diplo mix) – 5:11
5. "Don't You Evah" (Matthew Dear mix) – 5:36
6. "Don't You Evah" (DJ Amaze & Alan Astor mix) – 5:31
7. "Don't You Evah" (Doc Delay Fixerupper) – 3:45
8. "Don't You Ever" (The Natural History original version) – 3:41

== Charts ==
=== Weekly charts ===
Chart (2008)	Peak position
Canada Rock (Billboard)	50
US Adult Alternative Songs (Billboard)	9
US Alternative Airplay (Billboard)	33

=== Year-end charts ===
Chart (2008)	Position
US Adult Alternative Songs (Billboard)	19
