= Charles Mount =

American artist

Charles Merrill Mount (1928–1995) was an American artist. Born in Brooklyn, New York in 1928 as Sherman Merrill Suchow, he later changed his name and studied at the Art Students League of New York. He won a Guggenheim Fellowship in 1956 and travelled to Europe where he worked in Italy, France, Britain and Ireland. He returned to the United States in 1969, and worked in New York and Washington, D.C. He specialized in portraits and also produced landscapes and streetscapes in oil and watercolor as well as charcoal drawings. He was interested in art history and published biographies of John Singer Sargent (1955), Gilbert Stuart (1964) and Claude Monet (1966). His career and personal life were marred by untreated bipolar disorder and a controversial later life, including a prison sentence for theft of rare documents. He died in 1995 in Washington, D.C. He is survived by five children from two marriages.

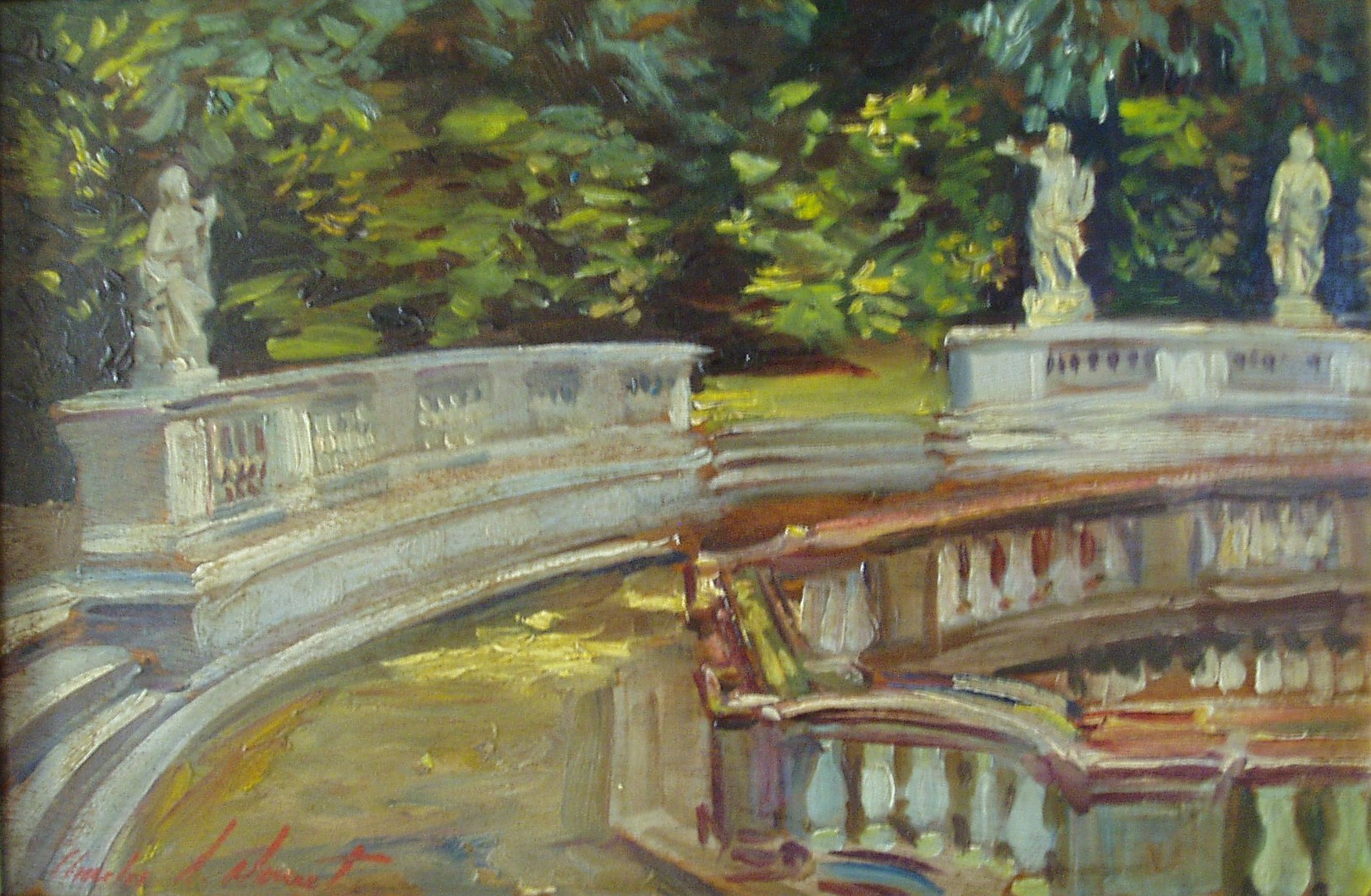
Charles Mount, Detail of the gardens at Versailles, oil on canvas, 1960

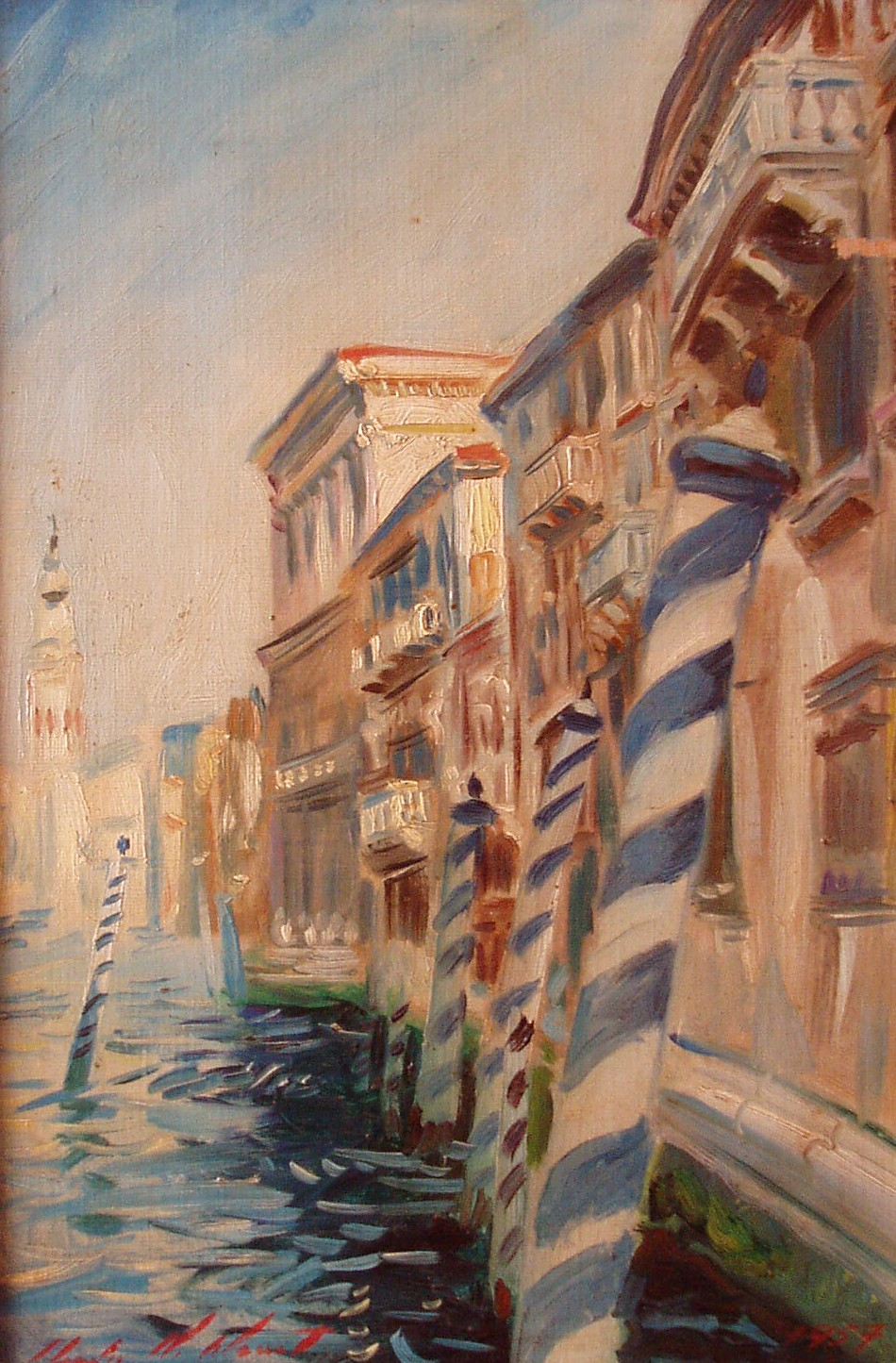
Charles Mount, Painting of Venetian canal, oil on canvas, 1960

== Publications ==
1955. John Singer Sargent: A Biography. New York.

1963. The Irish career of Gilbert Stewart. Bulletin of the Irish Georgian Society, Vol. VI.

1964. Gilbert Stuart: A Biography. New York

1964. Carolus-Duran and the Development of Sargent, The ART Quarterly, Number 4.

1966. Monet, A Biography. New York.

1972-3. November 24, 1873, The Precise Moment of Impressionism: Claude Monet's "The Bridge at Argenteuil" at the National Gallery of Art in Washington, D.C. Records of the Columbia Historical Society, Vol. 71-2, p. 508-547.

1972-3. The Rabbit and the Boa Constrictor: John Singer Sargent at the White House. Records of the Columbia Historical Society, Vol. 71-2, p. 618-656.

1973-4. The Works of John Singer Sargent in Washington. Records of the Columbia Historical Society, Vol. 73-4, p. 443-492.

== Paintings ==
Self-portrait, 1960, in the Collection of the University of Limerick.

== Controversy ==
Mount was arrested at Goodspeed's Book Shop in Boston, Massachusetts, on August 13, 1987, by the Federal Bureau of Investigation (FBI) for attempting to sell 158 Civil War documents to Claire Rochefort. These documents had been stolen from the National Archives and Records Administration. Mount was also in possession of additional letters stolen from both the Library of Congress and National Archives, in what is one of the largest rare documents thefts, with the value of the stolen items totalling over $100,000.

Mount was initially charged with two counts of interstate transportation of stolen property, with the first count on the Whistler letters from the Library of Congress and the Churchill and James letters from the National Archives. The second count covered 144 of the 158 Civil War documents Mount was attempting to sell to Rochefort. Because of excellent record-keeping by both institutions, including call slips and microfilm versions of the documents, Mount was convicted on March 30, 1989, and was sentenced to eight years in prison.

== Archives material ==
Smithsonian Archives of American Art Charles Merrill Mount papers relating to Gilbert Stuart, [ca. 1950–1960]

== Bibliography ==
- Galvin, T. (Summer 1990). "The Boston Case of Charles Merrill Mount: The Archivist's Arch Enemy." American Archivist, vol. 53. pp. 442–450.
