= French Kicks =

American indie rock band

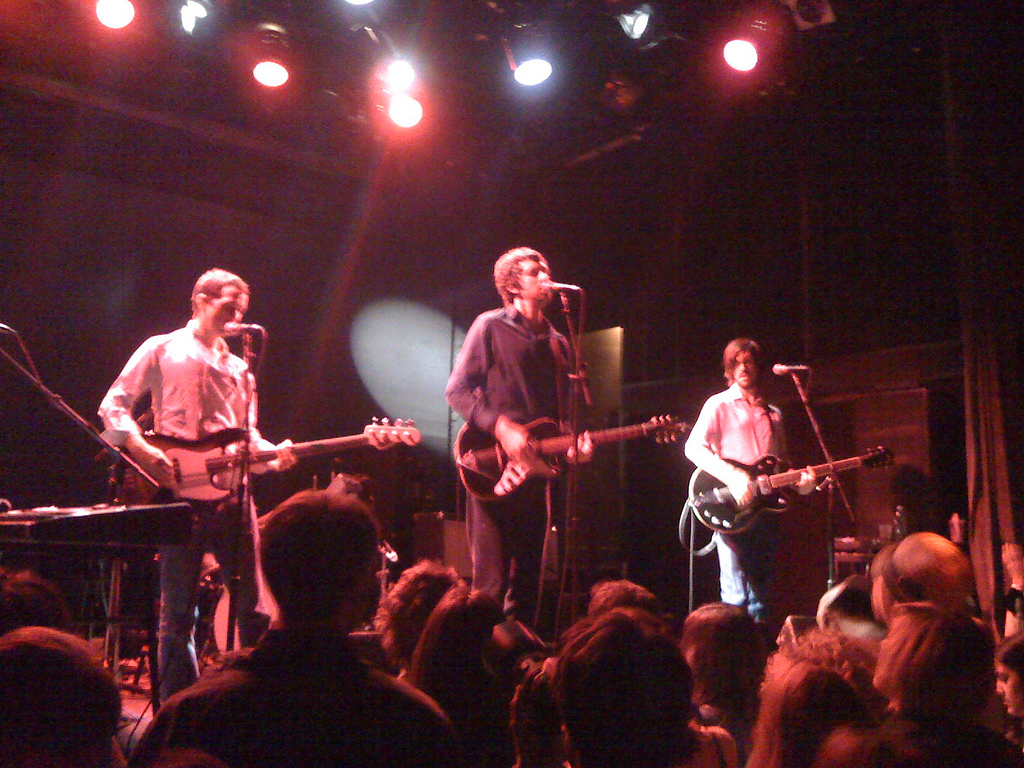
- French Kicks Performing at the Bowery Ballroom (September 2008)

Background information
- Origin: New York City, U.S.
- Genres: Garage punk, Post-punk revival, Indie rock, Electronic
- Years active: 1998–2009
- Label: Startime International/Vagrant Records
- Past members: Nick Stumpf; Josh Wise; Lawrence Stumpf; Aaron Thurston; Jamie Krents; Matthew Stinchcomb; Kush El Amin

French Kicks were an American indie rock group from New York City, United States. Their sound is a mix of garage rock, post-punk, and modded pop.

== History ==
Three of the original four band members, bassist Jamie Krents, vocalist/drummer Nick Stumpf, and vocalist/guitarist Matthew Stinchcomb, are from Washington, D.C. They were heavily influenced by the hardcore scene that flourished during their youth in the D.C. area. They began playing together in a series of bands while in their teens and then all attended Oberlin College in Ohio, where they continued to play together. The three friends then moved to Brooklyn, New York after college, where the French Kicks were formed with vocalist/guitarist Josh Wise, a Princeton grad who originally hailed from Huntsville, Alabama.

Having performed their first shows at Luna Lounge on Manhattan's Lower East Side, in 1999 they released a self-titled EP The French Kicks under the label My Pal God. Soon, after a lot of touring, the band signed to Startime International. They soon released the Young Lawyer EP in 2001. The group then embarked on a tour with fellow garage rockers The Vue and The Walkmen. In 2002 they released their first full-length album, One Time Bells. Jamie Krents departed the band the next year, and was replaced on bass by Lawrence Stumpf, Nick's younger brother. The following year they headlined Sepomana, WRMC 91.1 FM's annual music festival. In 2004, their next album, The Trial of the Century was released. Another personnel change occurred when Nick stopped playing drums at live shows to concentrate on his lead singing. A series of temporary drummers filled his spot until the band settled on Aaron Thurston, a Massachusetts native. In late 2005, Stinchcomb announced that he was leaving the band.

In early 2010, rumors circulated that the band may have broken up or had held off work indefinitely.

Their video for their single "So Far We Are" also features actress Olivia Wilde.

In 2011, they appeared on the soundtrack for the movie The Art of Getting By.

== Members ==
=== Past members ===
- Nick Stumpf – vocals, guitars, keyboards
- Josh Wise – vocals, guitars
- Lawrence Stumpf – guitars
- Aaron Thurston – drums
- Jamie Krents – bass
- Matthew Stinchcomb –drums, vocals
- Kush El Amin – guitars

== Discography ==
=== Albums ===
- One Time Bells (2002, Startime)
- The Trial of the Century (2004, Startime)
- Two Thousand (2006, Startime/Vagrant)
- Swimming (2008, Vagrant)

=== EPs ===
- French Kicks (1998, My Pal God)
- Young Lawyer (2001, Startime)
- Close to Modern Remixes (2003)
- Roller (2006)
- Covers (2008, Vagrant)

=== Compilation appearances ===
- The My Pal God Holiday Record 2 "Alabaster City"
- This Is Next Year: A Brooklyn-Based Compilation "1985" (Alt Version)
