= Startime International =

American record label

- Parent company: Sony Music Entertainment
- Founded: 2000
- Founder: Isaac Green
- Defunct: 2017
- Distributor(s): Columbia Records
- Genre: Alternative rock; indie pop; indie rock
- Country of origin: U.S.
- Location: New York City
- Official website: www.startimeintl.com

Startime International was a New York City-based record label founded by Isaac Green, active between 2000 and 2017. It was owned by Sony Music Entertainment and distributed by Columbia Records. Its roster included Foster the People, Coin, Natalie Prass, Bully, The Walkmen, Lewis Del Mar, and The Big Moon.

== History ==
Green moved to Brooklyn and started the label out of his apartment, armed with one band: French Kicks. Startime's first release was the Kicks' EP Young Lawyer in late 2000. This was soon followed by releases by Brendan Benson, The Walkmen, and The Natural History.

In 2003, the label released a compilation album, StarTime International Presents: Super-Cuts. Beginning around 2005, the label became a subsidiary of Columbia Records Group. It became inactive following the release of COIN's 2017 sophomore album, How Will You Know If You Never Try.

The label's biggest commercial and critical successes included The Walkmen's Everyone Who Pretended To Like Me Is Gone (2002), Peter Bjorn and John's Writer's Block (U.S. release, 2009), and Foster the People's Torches (2011).

== Roster ==
- Brendan Benson
- The Big Moon
- Bully
- COIN
- The Duke Spirit
- Foster the People
- French Kicks
- The Futureheads
- The Joggers
- Lewis Del Mar
- The Natural History
- Northern State
- Passion Pit
- Peter Bjorn and John
- Natalie Prass
- Shugo Tokumaru
- Tom Vek
- The Walkmen
- Wild Light

== See also ==
- Almost Gold Recordings
- List of record labels
