= Spoon discography =

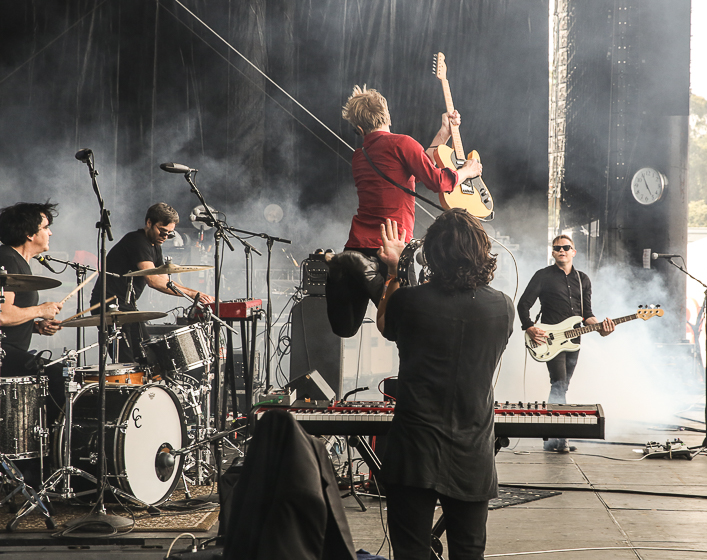
- Spoon performing at Outside Lands festival in 2014
- Studio albums: 10
- EPs: 8
- Compilation albums: 1
- Singles: 27
- Other appearances: 6

The discography of American rock band Spoon consists of 10 studio albums, four EPs, and 26 singles. Formed in 1993 in Austin, Texas by Britt Daniel (vocals, guitar) and Jim Eno (drums), Spoon released their debut studio album, Telephono, in 1996 on Matador Records. Their follow-up full-length, A Series of Sneaks, was released in 1998 on Elektra, who subsequently dropped the band. Spoon went on to sign with Merge Records, where Spoon gained greater commercial success and critical acclaim with the albums Girls Can Tell (2001), Kill the Moonlight (2002), and particularly Gimme Fiction (2005), which debuted at number 44 on the Billboard 200 and sold over 300,000 copies in the US. The group's next three albums - Ga Ga Ga Ga Ga (2007), Transference (2010), and They Want My Soul (2014) - reached the top 10 of the US charts, while the latter two peaked in the top 20 in Canada and the top 50 in Australia. The band's ninth album, Hot Thoughts, was released on March 17, 2017.

== Albums ==
=== Studio albums ===
List of studio albums, with selected chart positions
Title	Details	Peak chart positions									
Title	Details	US	AUS	BEL (FL)	CAN	GER	JPN	NED	POR	SWI	UK
Telephono	Released: April 23, 1996; Label: Matador; Formats: CD, LP	—	—	—	—	—	—	—	—	—	—
A Series of Sneaks	Released: May 5, 1998; Label: Elektra; Formats: CD, LP	—	—	—	—	—	—	—	—	—	—
Girls Can Tell	Released: February 20, 2001; Label: Merge; Formats: CD, LP	—	—	—	—	—	—	—	—	—	—
Kill the Moonlight	Released: August 20, 2002; Label: Merge; Formats: CD, LP	— (Note: Kill the Moonlight did not enter the US Billboard 200, but peaked at number 24 on the US Heatseekers Albums Chart.)	— (Note: Kill the Moonlight did not enter the Australian ARIA Albums Chart but peaked at number 13 on the ARIA Hitseekers Chart.)	—	—	—	—	—	—	—	—
Gimme Fiction	Released: May 10, 2005; Label: Merge; Formats: CD, LP, download	44	— (Note: Gimme Fiction did not enter the Australian ARIA Albums Chart but peaked at number 18 on the ARIA Hitseekers Chart.)	—	—	—	—	—	—	—	—
Ga Ga Ga Ga Ga	Released: July 7, 2007; Label: Merge; Formats: CD, LP, download	10	57	—	—	—	—	— (Note: Ga Ga Ga Ga Ga did not enter the Dutch Album Top 100, but peaked at number 13 on the Dutch Alternative Albums chart.)	—	—	—
Transference	Released: January 15, 2010; Label: Merge; Formats: CD, LP, download	4	47	—	20	—	158	— (Note: Transference did not enter the Dutch Album Top 100, but peaked at number 10 on the Dutch Alternative Albums chart.)	—	—	— (Note: "Transference" did not enter the UK Albums Chart, but peaked at number 11 on the UK Vinyl Albums Chart.)
They Want My Soul	Released: August 5, 2014; Label: Loma Vista; Formats: CD, LP, download	4	43	112	10	—	100	50	—	—	102
Hot Thoughts	Released: March 17, 2017; Label: Matador; Formats: CD, LP, download	17	21	48	39	40	171	27	28	33	76
Lucifer on the Sofa	Released: February 11, 2022; Label: Matador; Formats: CD, LP, download	38	41	70	—	30	188	41	50	47	92
"—" denotes a recording that did not chart or was not released in that territory.

=== Compilation albums ===
List of compilation albums, with selected chart positions
Title	Details	Peak chart positions				
Title	Details	US	US Indie	SCO	UK Sales	UK Indie
Everything Hits at Once	Released: July 26, 2019; Label: Matador; Formats: CD, LP, download	— (Note: Everything Hits at Once: The Best of Spoon did not enter the US Billboard 200, but peaked at number 52 on the US Album Sales Chart.)	15	86	84	22
All the Weird Kids Up Front (Más Rolas Chidas)	Released: August 29, 2020; Label: Matador; Formats: LP	— (Note: All the Weird Kids Up Front (Más Rolas Chidas) did not enter the US Billboard 200, but peaked at number 77 on the US Current Album Sales Chart.)	—	—	—	—
"—" denotes a recording that did not chart or was not released in that territory.

=== Remix albums ===
List of compilation albums, with selected chart positions
Title	Details	Peak chart positions
Title	Details	US
Lucifer on the Moon	Released: November 4, 2022; Label: Matador; Formats: LP, download	— (Note: Lucifer on the Moon did not enter the US Billboard 200, but peaked at number 70 on the US Current Album Sales Chart.)
"—" denotes a recording that did not chart or was not released in that territory.

== EPs ==
- Nefarious (1994, Fluffer)
- Soft Effects (1997, Matador; Reissued 2006, Merge)
- 30 Gallon Tank (1998, Elektra)
- Love Ways (2000, Merge)
- Don't You Evah (2008, Merge)
- Got Nuffin (2009, Merge)
- Wild EP (2022, Matador)
- Memory Dust (2023, Matador)

== Singles ==
List of singles as lead artist, with selected chart positions, showing year released and album name
Title	Year	Peak chart positions										Album
Title	Year	US Sales	US AAA	US Alt	US Dance	US Rock	BEL (FL)	CAN Rock	MEX	UK	UK Indie	Album
"All the Negatives Have Been Destroyed"	1996	—	—	—	—	—	—	—	—	—	—	Telephono
"Not Turning Off"	1996	—	—	—	—	—	—	—	—	—	—	Telephono
"Anticipation"	1998	—	—	—	—	—	—	—	—	—	—	Non-album singles
"The Agony of Laffitte"	1999	—	—	—	—	—	—	—	—	—	—	Non-album singles
"Anything You Want"	2001	—	—	—	—	—	—	—	—	—	—	Girls Can Tell
"Everything Hits at Once"	2001	—	—	—	—	—	—	—	—	—	—	Girls Can Tell
"Car Radio"	2001	—	—	—	—	—	—	—	—	—	—	A Series of Sneaks
"Text Later"	2002	—	—	—	—	—	—	—	—	—	—	Split single
"Someone Something"	2002	—	—	—	—	—	—	—	—	—	—	Kill the Moonlight
"Jonathon Fisk"	2002	—	—	—	—	—	—	—	—	—	—	Kill the Moonlight
"Stay Don't Go"	2003	—	—	—	—	—	—	—	—	—	—	Kill the Moonlight
"The Way We Get By"	2003	—	—	—	—	—	—	—	—	—	—	Kill the Moonlight
"I Turn My Camera On"	2005	31	—	—	—	—	—	—	—	194	26	Gimme Fiction
"My First Time Volume 3"	2005	—	—	—	—	—	—	—	—	—	—	Non-album single
"Sister Jack"	2005	—	—	—	—	—	—	—	—	—	38	Gimme Fiction
"The Underdog"	2007	—	3	26	—	—	—	38	—	—	—	Ga Ga Ga Ga Ga
"You Got Yr. Cherry Bomb"	2007	—	—	—	—	—	—	—	—	—	—	Ga Ga Ga Ga Ga
"Don't You Evah"	2008	1	9	33	1	—	—	50	—	—	—	Ga Ga Ga Ga Ga
"Got Nuffin"	2009	1	—	—	—	43	—	—	—	— (Note: "Got Nuffin" did not enter the UK Singles Chart, but peaked at number 91 on the UK Physical Singles Chart.)	—	Transference
"Written in Reverse"	2009	30	—	—	—	—	—	—	13	—	—	Transference
"Rent I Pay"	2014	—	—	—	—	44	—	—	—	—	—	They Want My Soul
"Do You"	2014	—	1	30	—	28	—	—	33	—	—	They Want My Soul
"Inside Out"	2014	—	14	—	—	33	—	—	—	—	—	They Want My Soul
"TV Set"	2015	—	—	—	—	—	—	—	33	— (Note: "TV Set" did not enter the UK Singles Chart, but peaked at number 93 on the UK Physical Singles Chart.)	—	Non-album single
"Hot Thoughts"	2017	—	1	19	—	21	—	—	43	— (Note: "Hot Thoughts" did not enter the UK Singles Chart, but peaked at number 42 on the UK Physical Singles Chart.)	—	Hot Thoughts
"Can I Sit Next to You"	2017	—	5	33	—	— (Note: "Can I Sit Next to You" did not enter the Hot Rock & Alternative Songs chart, but peaked at number 32 on the Rock & Alternative Airplay chart.)	— (Note: "Can I Sit Next to You" did not enter the Flanders Ultratop Top 50, but charted as an "extra tip" on the Flanders Ultratop Bubbling Under chart.)	—	47	—	—	Hot Thoughts
"Do I Have to Talk You Into It"	2017	—	18	—	—	—	—	—	—	—	—	Hot Thoughts
"No Bullets Spent"	2019	—	3	—	—	— (Note: "No Bullets Spent" did not enter the Hot Rock & Alternative Songs chart, but peaked at number 38 on the Rock & Alternative Airplay chart.)	—	—	—	—	—	Everything Hits at Once
"Rainy Taxi (Big Beat)"	2020	—	—	—	—	—	—	—	—	—	—	Non-album single
"The Hardest Cut"	2021	—	1	29	—	— (Note: "The Hardest Cut" did not enter the Hot Rock & Alternative Songs chart, but peaked at number 21 on the Rock & Alternative Airplay chart.)	—	—	—	—	—	Lucifer On the Sofa
"Wild"	2021	—	3	—	—	— (Note: "Wild" did not enter the Hot Rock & Alternative Songs chart, but peaked at number 27 on the Rock & Alternative Airplay chart.)	—	—	19	— (Note: "Wild" did not enter the UK Singles Chart, but peaked at number five on the UK Physical Singles Chart.)	—	Lucifer On the Sofa
"My Babe"	2022	—	5	—	—	— (Note: "My Babe" did not enter the Hot Rock & Alternative Songs chart, but peaked at number 38 on the Rock & Alternative Airplay chart.)	—	—	—	—	—	Lucifer On the Sofa
"On the Radio"	2022	—	25	—	—	—	—	—	—	—	—	Lucifer On the Moon
"I Can't Give Everything Away"	2023	—	—	—	—	—	—	—	—	—	—	Non-album single
"Sugar Babies"	2023	—	—	—	—	—	—	—	—	—	—	Memory Dust
“Guess I’m Fallin In Love” / “Chateau Blues”	2025	—	32	—	—	—	—	—	—	—	—	TBA
“Guess I’m Fallin In Love” / “Chateau Blues”	2025	—	25	—	—	— (Note: "Guess I’m Fallin In Love" did not enter the Hot Rock & Alternative Songs chart, but peaked at number 48 on the Rock & Alternative Airplay chart.)	—	—	—	—	—	TBA
"—" denotes releases that did not chart or were not released in that region.

== Other charting songs ==
Song	Year	MEX	Album
"They Want My Soul"	2015	35	They Want My Soul
"Shotgun"	2017	39	Hot Thoughts

== Other songs ==
- "Primary (Nefarious Mix)" on "Dreamboat" (1995, Cassiel Records)
- "Don't Buy the Realistic" and "Telamon Bridge" on What's Up Matador? (1997, Matador Records)
- "Operation In Progress" on Rock and Roll Free-For-All Vol. 2 (1997, Nickel & Dime Records)
- "Tear Me Down" on Wig in a Box (2003, Off Records)
- "Decora" (Yo La Tengo cover) on The Believer 2005 Music Issue CD (2005, The Believer)
- "The Book I Write" and 3 previously released tracks on Stranger than Fiction Original Soundtrack (2006, Columbia Records/Sony)
- "Well-Alright" on Dark Was the Night (2009, 4AD)
