= Found on Film =

Video by Maxïmo Park
- Released: 5 June 2006
- Genre: Post-punk revival Indie rock
- Length: 143 minutes
- Label: Warp

Maxïmo Park chronology
Missing Songs (2005)	Found on Film (2006)	Our Earthly Pleasures (2007)

Found On Film is a multimedia release by Maxïmo Park containing a DVD principally of live footage and a CD of live session recordings from the BBC. Like the b-sides compilation Missing Songs, it was released to complement the success of their debut album A Certain Trigger. The two discs come in a hardcover book case with several pages of photos taken by the band over the course of the tour for the album. The name is taken from the lyrics of the last single from A Certain Trigger, 'I Want You To Stay'.

== DVD contents ==
Found On Film: A Certain Trigger Tour Documentary.

Live At Brixton Academy

No.	Title	Length
1.	"Graffiti"
2.	"The Coast Is Always Changing"
3.	"Limassol"
4.	"Postcard Of A Painting"
5.	"I Want You To Stay"
6.	"Signal And Sign"
7.	"Kiss You Better"
8.	"Now I'm All Over The Shop"
9.	"Once, A Glimpse"
10.	"Apply Some Pressure"
11.	"The Night I Lost My Head"
12.	"Going Missing"

The music that plays over the end credits is an excerpt of the Field Music and J. Xaverre Remix of 'I Want You To Stay'.

Live At Newcastle Academy

No.	Title	Length
1.	"Signal And Sign"
2.	"Fear Of Falling"
3.	"I Want You To Leave"
4.	"Postcard Of A Painting"
5.	"I Want You To Stay"
6.	"Limassol"

Music videos for:

- Apply Some Pressure (Version 1, early demo video)
- The Coast Is Always Changing
- Graffiti
- Going Missing
- Apply Some Pressure (Version 2, commercially released video)
- I Want You To Stay

AOL live session videos for:

- I Want You To Stay
- Graffiti
- Going Missing

== BBC Live Sessions CD ==
No.	Title	Writer(s)	Length
1.	"The Coast Is Always Changing"	Lloyd, Smith	3:13
2.	"Now I'm All Over The Shop"	Lloyd, Smith	2:39
3.	"Apply Some Pressure"	Lloyd, Smith	3:09
4.	"Kiss You Better"	Smith	2:09
5.	"Graffiti"	Lloyd, Smith	2:55
6.	"Surrender" (The only released version of this song)	Lloyd, Smith	3:09
7.	"Going Missing"	Lloyd, Smith	3:33
8.	"Shiver" (Cover version of the Natalie Imbruglia song)	Imbruglia, White, Solomon	3:49
9.	"I Want You To Stay" (Lloyd, Smith)	Wooller, Smith	3:41
10.	"Stray Talk" (Unlisted bonus track, recorded live at Duncan Lloyd's home)	Lloyd, Smith	2:46

Total running time approx. 2 hours and 23 minutes.

== Trivia ==
A mistake on the back of the Found On Film DVD reads: "Live at Newcastle Academy (Filmed 10/12/06)", when they in fact played there on 10/12/05. The DVD got released a good four months before 10/12/06.

The Brixton Academy concert was originally shot for MTV. Filmed 17/02/05, it was directed by James Russell with seven cameras at his disposal.

The titular tour documentary, Found On Film, was made by Film Bee, a group of artist filmmakers and also friends of the band. It was shot exclusively on Super 8 film to intimately capture the excitement of the band's first major UK tour.
