= All the Weird Kids Up Front =

Compilation album by Spoon
- Released: August 29, 2020
- Recorded: 2000–2017
- Studio: Various
- Genre: Indie rock; indie pop; art rock; post-punk revival
- Length: 44:39
- Label: Matador

Spoon chronology
| Everything Hits at Once (2019) | All the Weird Kids Up Front (2020) | Lucifer on the Sofa (2022) |

All the Weird Kids Up Front (Más Rolas Chidas) is a compilation album by American rock band Spoon. It was released on August 29, 2020, for Record Store Day, through Matador Records. It is a companion piece to their 2019 greatest hits album Everything Hits at Once: The Best of Spoon, with a track listing submitted and voted on by fans. The compilation was announced on March 5, 2020. The album peaked at number 77 on the Billboard Top Current Albums chart.

== Track listing ==
| No. | Title | Writer(s) | Length |
|---|---|---|---|
| 1. | "The Fitted Shirt" (Girls Can Tell, 2001) | Britt Daniel | 3:12 |
| 2. | "Don't Make Me a Target" (Ga Ga Ga Ga Ga, 2007) | Daniel | 3:59 |
| 3. | "The Beast and Dragon, Adored" (Gimme Fiction, 2005) | Daniel | 4:18 |
| 4. | "Is Love Forever?" (Transference, 2010) | Daniel | 2:07 |
| 5. | "I Summon You" (Gimme Fiction, 2005) | Daniel | 3:55 |
| 6. | "Out Go the Lights" (Transference, 2010) | Daniel | 4:36 |
| 7. | "Who Makes Your Money" (Transference, 2010) | Daniel | 3:44 |
| 8. | "The Ghost of You Lingers" (Ga Ga Ga Ga Ga, 2007) | Daniel | 3:34 |
| 9. | "Paper Tiger" (Kill the Moonlight, 2002) | Daniel | 3:07 |
| 10. | "Whisperi'lllistentohearit" (Hot Thoughts, 2017) | Daniel | 4:20 |
| 11. | "Tear It Down" (Hot Thoughts, 2017) | Daniel; Laura Pergolizzi | 4:20 |
| 12. | "New York Kiss" (They Want My Soul, 2014) | Daniel; Dan Wilson | 3:27 |
| Total length: | | | 44:39 |
