= Lucifer on the Sofa =

Studio album by Spoon
- Released: February 11, 2022
- Recorded: Late 2019 – March 10, 2020; September 2020 – Early 2021
- Studios: Public Hi-Fi (Austin, Texas); The Catacomb (Austin, Texas); Off Track Betting (Los Angeles)
- Genres: Indie rock; blues rock
- Length: 38:28
- Label: Matador
- Producers: Spoon; Mark Rankin; Dave Fridmann; Justin Raisen

Spoon chronology
All the Weird Kids Up Front (2020)	Lucifer on the Sofa (2022)	Lucifer on the Moon (2022)

Singles from Lucifer on the Sofa
- 1. "The Hardest Cut" Released: October 28, 2021; 2. "Wild" Released: December 10, 2021; 3. "My Babe" Released: February 8, 2022

Lucifer on the Sofa is the tenth studio album by American rock band Spoon, released on February 11, 2022, through Matador Records. Spoon began work on the album in late 2018 after the conclusion of their tour supporting Hot Thoughts (2017), their ninth studio album. Recording sessions began in late 2019 and took place in studios between Austin, Texas, and Los Angeles, California. They primarily recorded the album with Mark Rankin, with Justin Raisen and Dave Fridmann, the latter of whom co-produced the band's previous two albums, each producing one song. Recording sessions continued until March 2020 but had to be postponed after the COVID-19 pandemic began severely impacting the United States. After completing the album in 2021, the band released the album's lead single, "The Hardest Cut", in October of that year.

Lucifer on the Sofa received widespread acclaim and was nominated for Best Rock Album at the 65th Annual Grammy Awards. A dub remix album entitled Lucifer on the Moon was released in November 2022.

== Recording ==
Spoon began working on a tenth studio album in late 2018 after their tour supporting their ninth studio album, Hot Thoughts (2017), concluded. Recording sessions began in late 2019 at drummer Jim Eno's Public Hi-Fi studio in the band's hometown of Austin, Texas. Band frontman Britt Daniel wanted to record the album in Austin in order to "do a different thing this time, and experience the vibe of a city". He chose Austin in particular because he had lived there when he was younger, and it held many memories and musical influences for the band. Lucifer on the Sofa is the first Spoon album to include new members Gerardo Larios (guitar) and Ben Trokan (bass guitar).

For the recording sessions, the band sought to replicate their sound as a live band, contrasting with the recording technique used for Hot Thoughts that mainly revolved around piecing song parts together; this came as a result of the band realizing they preferred the sound of the live versions of their songs over their studio recordings. Daniel invited Mark Rankin to produce the album. Daniel had been enamored with Rankin's production work with Adele and Queens of the Stone Age, and enlisted Rankin to co-produce Spoon's 2019 song "No Bullets Spent", which was made to help promote their greatest hits album, Everything Hits at Once (2019). The band also spent time recording with Justin Raisen for the song "Feels Alright" and Dave Fridmann, who co-produced the previous two Spoon albums, They Want My Soul (2014) and Hot Thoughts, for the song "Lucifer on the Sofa". Spoon began recording parts for "Lucifer on the Sofa" in Austin during December 2020 and sent them to Fridmann, who produced the track remotely from his Tarbox Road studio in Fredonia, New York.

Until March 10, 2020, there had been roughly seven recording sessions for Lucifer on the Sofa. The sessions continued until the COVID-19 pandemic began severely impacting the United States in March 2020, forcing band members to shelter at their respective homes due to a nationwide lockdown. "Feels Alright" was the last song to be worked on prior to the lockdown, with tracking being done on March 10. Before the lockdown, the album had been between 70- and 80-percent finished and the band had expected to finish it completely in the midyear, potentially releasing it in the fall of that year. The album's expected completion period continued to be pushed back as the number of cases sharply rose in the country, particularly in Texas, where the band had been recording. During the lockdown period, Daniel began writing more songs at his home. Additionally, he occasionally drove out to Los Angeles to work on the album with guitarist Alex Fischel. Full recording sessions resumed in September 2020. By that point, a total of 30 songs had been either written or recorded for the album. The pandemic caused Lucifer on the Sofa to become Spoon's most time-consuming album to record.

== Promotion and release ==
Spoon began teasing the announcement of new material on October 27, 2021, with short clips uploaded to their social media accounts alongside the hashtag "#LOTS". The band announced Lucifer on the Sofa the next day and simultaneously released the album's lead single, "The Hardest Cut". The song was accompanied by a music video that Billboard described as a "Halloween-appropriate sub-story about a knife-wielding killer preparing to off his latest victim". On October 28 and 29, the band livestreamed concerts, titled Back to the Life, that were shot in Los Angeles during the previous month. The second single from Lucifer on the Sofa, "Wild", was released as a 7-inch single on December 10, 2021. The song was backed with a remix by Dennis Bovell on the B-side. "Wild" was released as a digital single later on January 11, 2022, accompanied by a music video that paid tribute to Hollywood Western films. Lucifer on the Sofa was included in the "Most Anticipated Albums of 2022" lists of Paste, Pitchfork, Stereogum, and Vulture. "My Babe" was released on February 8, 2022, as the final single to come before the album's release. Lucifer on the Sofa was released through Matador Records on February 11, 2022, on digital platforms and physically as a CD and 12-inch vinyl record, with certain retailers carrying different color variations of the vinyl record.

=== Lucifer on the Moon ===
A dub remix album entitled Lucifer on the Moon was released by Matador on November 4, 2022. It features reconstructions of each track by British record producer Adrian Sherwood.

== Critical reception ==
Professional ratings
Aggregate scores
Source	Rating
AnyDecentMusic?	8.0/10
Metacritic	85/100
Review scores
Source	Rating
AllMusic	4/5 stars
The Austin Chronicle	4/5 stars
The A.V. Club	A−
Entertainment Weekly	A−
The Guardian	5/5 stars
The Independent	5/5 stars
Pitchfork	7.4/10
Rolling Stone	4.5/5 stars
Slant Magazine	2.5/5 stars
Uncut	8/10

Lucifer on the Sofa was released to widespread critical acclaim from contemporary music critics. At Metacritic, which assigns a normalized rating out of 100 to reviews from mainstream critics, the album received an average score of 85, based on 20 reviews, which indicates "universal acclaim". Aggregator AnyDecentMusic? gave it 8.0 out of 10, based on their assessment of the critical consensus.

Michael Hann of The Guardian gave the album a perfect five-star rating, writing, "Ten albums and nearly 30 years into their career, Spoon still sound like Spoon: fresh, timeless and wholly in control of their work." Jon Dolan of Rolling Stone and Roisin O'Connor of The Independent deemed it the band's best album to date. In an A− review, Chuck Kerr of Entertainment Weekly called it "Spoon's loosest, liveliest album since 2010's unruly low-fi gem Transference, which combines that LP's spontaneous spirit with the meticulous production and sharp melodic hooks of their most memorable work." Uncut praised the album's "precision and immediacy" and called Spoon "indie rock's most consistent band." Heather Phares of AllMusic praised the album's traditional rock leanings: "Lucifer on the Sofa has the satisfying impact, ebb, and flow of a great rock concert. It's a move that feels genuine; no matter how much they pare it down or polish it up, rock 'n' roll is at the heart of Spoon's music." Annie Zaleski of The A.V. Club wrote, "Lucifer on the Sofa is one of the band's most focused songwriting efforts yet: Every note feels deliberately placed and well-constructed, with crisp arrangements (the piano-sprinkled ballad "My Babe"), piercing hooks (the elastic "The Devil & Mr. Jones") and sweeping dynamics (the melodramatic, glammy art-rock waltz "Satellite"). Alfred Soto of Pitchfork gave the album a 7.4 out of 10, calling it a "Back to Basics Album" and lamenting the lack of experimentation which characterized Hot Thoughts (2017).

In a less favorable review, Charles Lyons-Burt of Slant Magazine wrote, "Spoon has hit something of a dead end with Lucifer on the Sofa. The album gestures toward breaking free of old habits, but it doesn't present any new ones, musically or otherwise."

=== Year-end lists ===
Lucifer on the Sofa on year-end lists
Publication	List	Rank	Ref.
The A.V. Club	The 30 best albums of 2022	12	
The Economist	The best albums of 2022	—N/a	
The Independent	The best albums of 2022	12	
Paste	The 50 Best Albums of 2022	9	
Rolling Stone	The 100 Best Albums of 2022	13	

== Track listing ==
All tracks produced by Mark Rankin and Spoon, except "Feels Alright", produced by Justin Raisen and Spoon, and "Lucifer on the Sofa", produced by Dave Fridmann and Spoon.

Lucifer on the Sofa track listing
No.	Title	Writer(s)	Length
1.	"Held"	Bill Callahan	4:44
2.	"The Hardest Cut"	Britt Daniel; Alex Fischel	3:13
3.	"The Devil & Mister Jones"	Andrew Cashen; Daniel	4:36
4.	"Wild"	Jack Antonoff; Daniel	3:13
5.	"My Babe"	Daniel	3:47
6.	"Feels Alright"	Daniel; Fischel	2:56
7.	"On the Radio"	Daniel	3:19
8.	"Astral Jacket"	Daniel	3:46
9.	"Satellite"	Daniel	3:45
10.	"Lucifer on the Sofa"	Daniel; Fischel	5:09
Total length:			38:28

Japanese edition (bonus track)
No.	Title	Length
11.	"Sugar Babies"	5:54
Total length:		44:29

== Personnel ==
Personnel adapted from the album's liner notes.

Spoon

- Britt Daniel – vocals (all tracks), electric guitar (tracks 2–4, 6, 7, 9), bass guitar (tracks 1, 7, 8), acoustic guitar (tracks 5 and 8), handclaps (track 2), keyboards (track 3), percussion (track 3), Mellotron (track 10)
- Jim Eno – drums (all tracks), percussion (tracks 3, 6, 8)
- Alex Fischel – electric guitar (tracks 2–5, 7, 9), piano (tracks 1, 3–7, 9), keyboards (tracks 1, 3, 6, 8–10), Melodica (track 3), drums (track 4), ARP Solina (track 7)
- Gerardo Larios – electric guitar (tracks 1, 2, 4, 6, 7, 9), bass guitar (tracks 5–7), piano (tracks 4 and 5), handclaps (track 2), organ (track 3), bass drum (track 8)
- Ben Trokan – bass guitar (tracks 2–4, 9, 10)

Additional musicians

- Steve Berlin – horns (track 3)
- Dave Fridmann – keyboards (track 10)
- Jennifer Marigliano – percussion (track 7)
- Caroline Rose – backing vocals (tracks 2 and 10)
- Ted Tafaro – saxophone (track 10)

Technical personnel

- Tchad Blake – mixer (tracks 2 and 4)
- Dave Cooley – mastering (all tracks)
- Britt Daniel – engineer (all tracks)
- Jim Eno – mixer (tracks 3, 6, and 8), engineer (all tracks)
- Grant Eppley – engineer (all tracks)
- Dave Fridmann – producer (track 10), mixer (track 10), engineer (track 10)
- Anthony Lopez – engineer (track 6)
- Mike McCarthy – mixer (track 1)
- Justin Raisen – producer (track 6)
- Mark Rankin – producer (tracks 1–5 and 7–9), mixer (tracks 5 and 9), engineer (tracks 1–9)
- Andrew Scheps – mixer (track 7)
- Spoon – producer (all tracks)
- Gabe Wax – additional producer (track 4), engineer (track 4)

Other personnel

- Matt de Jong – design
- Mike Krol – cover art assistance
- Jamie-James Medina – design
- Edel Rodriguez – illustration
- Undercard – design

== Charts ==
Chart performance for Lucifer on the Sofa
Chart (2022)	Peak position
Australian Albums (ARIA)	41
Belgian Albums (Ultratop Flanders)	70
Dutch Albums (Album Top 100)	41
French Physical Albums (SNEP)	100
German Albums (Offizielle Top 100)	30
Japanese Albums (Oricon)	188
Portuguese Albums (AFP)	39
Scottish Albums (Official Charts)	21
Spanish Albums (Promusicae)	74
Swiss Albums (Schweizer Hitparade)	47
UK Albums (Official Charts)	92
UK Independent Albums (Official Charts)	7
US Billboard 200	38
US Independent Albums (Billboard)	4
US Top Alternative Albums (Billboard)	4
US Top Rock Albums (Billboard)	4
