= Missing Songs =

Compilation album by Maxïmo Park
- Released: 27 July 2005
- Recorded: 2004–2005
- Genre: Alternative rock, post-punk revival, indie rock
- Length: 32:00
- Label: Warp
- Producer: Paul Epworth

Maxïmo Park chronology
A Certain Trigger (2005)	Missing Songs (2005)	Found on Film (2006)

Professional ratings
Review scores
Source	Rating
AllMusic	3.5/5 stars
Pitchfork Media	6.4/10

Missing Songs is a compilation album by the British indie rock band Maxïmo Park comprising B-sides and demos previously available only on British released singles, released on 27 July 2005 in Japan and on 9 January 2006 in the UK.

The cover of John Lennon's song "Isolation" was also featured as part of a multi-artist compilation CD "John Lennon Covered", which was given away with an issue of Q Magazine.

== Track listing ==
No.	Title	Writer(s)	Length
1.	"A19" (B-side to "Going Missing")	Duncan Lloyd, Paul Smith	2:19
2.	"Isolation" (B-side to "Apply Some Pressure")	John Lennon	1:14
3.	"My Life in Reverse" (B-side to "Apply Some Pressure")	Smith	3:20
4.	"Fear of Falling" (B-side to "Apply Some Pressure")	Archis Tiku, Smith	2:36
5.	"I Want You to Leave" (B-side to "Apply Some Pressure")	Lloyd, Lukas Wooller, Smith	2:18
6.	"A Year of Doubt" (B-side to "Going Missing")	Smith	2:01
7.	"Trial and Error" (B-side to "Graffiti")	Lloyd, Smith	2:32
8.	"Stray Talk" (B-side to "Graffiti")	Lloyd, Smith	2:47
9.	"Hammer Horror" (B-side to "Graffiti")	Wooller, Lloyd, Smith	3:46
10.	"Apply Some Pressure" (Original Demo)	Lloyd, Smith	3:28
11.	"Graffiti" (Original Demo)	Lloyd, Smith	3:11
12.	"Once, a Glimpse" (Original Demo)	Lloyd, Smith	3:27

iTunes deluxe edition bonus tracks
No.	Title	Length
13.	"La Quinta"	2:39
14.	"I Want You to Stay" (Field Music/J Xaverre Mix)	4:09
15.	"I Want You to Stay" (Christian Vogel Mix)	4:42

Japanese version BRE-19
No.	Title	Writer(s)	Length
1.	"Going Missing"	Lloyd, Smith	3:44
2.	"Fear of Falling" (B-side to "Apply Some Pressure")	Archis Tiku, Smith	2:34
3.	"Apply Some Pressure" (original demo version)	Lloyd, Smith	3:25
4.	"A19" (B-side to "Going Missing")	Lloyd, Smith	2:19
5.	"Graffiti" (Original Demo Version)	Lloyd, Smith	3:09
6.	"Trial and Error" (B-side to "Graffiti")	Lloyd, Smith	2:29
7.	"Kiss You Better" (Acoustic)	Smith	2:03
8.	"Hammer Horror" (B-side to "Graffiti")	Wooller, Lloyd, Smith	3:46
9.	"Stray Talk" (B-side to "Graffiti")	Lloyd, Smith	2:47
