= Everything Hits at Once: The Best of Spoon =

- Physical release cover art

Greatest hits album by Spoon
- Released: July 26, 2019
- Recorded: 2000 – Spring 2019
- Studio: Various
- Genre: Indie rock; art rock; post-punk revival
- Length: 45:39
- Label: Matador
- Producer: Jon Brion; Joe Chiccarelli; Britt Daniel; Jim Eno; Dave Fridmann; Mike McCarthy; Mark Rankin; Spoon

Spoon chronology
Hot Thoughts (2017)	Everything Hits at Once: The Best of Spoon (2019)	All the Weird Kids Up Front (2020)

Singles from Everything Hits at Once: The Best of Spoon
- 1. "No Bullets Spent" Released: June 19, 2019

Alternative cover
- Digital release cover art

Professional ratings
Aggregate scores
Source	Rating
Metacritic	84/100
Review scores
Source	Rating
AllMusic	4/5 stars
The Austin Chronicle	3.5/5 stars
Exclaim!	8/10
The Independent	4/5 stars
The Line of Best Fit	10/10
Popmatters	8/10
Rolling Stone	4/5 stars
Tom Hull – on the Web	B+

Everything Hits at Once: The Best of Spoon is a greatest hits compilation album by American rock band Spoon. It was released on July 26, 2019, through Matador Records. The compilation was announced on June 19, 2019, coinciding with the release of new single "No Bullets Spent."

The album was conceived and compiled by Spoon lead singer Britt Daniel, who chose the track list to act as an introduction to the band for new listeners. Other tracks, such as "My Mathematical Mind" from Gimme Fiction and selections from A Series of Sneaks, were considered by Daniel but were cut due to time constraints. Although greatest hits compilations were uncommon by the late 2010s, Daniel chose to create Everything Hits at Once based on his fondness for such compilations, in particular Standing on a Beach by The Cure and Substance 1987 by New Order, which had introduced him to those artists in his youth.

A companion compilation, titled All the Weird Kids Up Front, was released in August 2020 and featured a track list selected by Spoon fans.

== Track listing ==
No.	Title	Producers	Length
1.	"I Turn My Camera On" (Gimme Fiction, 2005)	Britt Daniel; Jim Eno; Mike McCarthy	3:13
2.	"Do You" (They Want My Soul, 2014)	Joe Chiccarelli; Spoon	3:33
3.	"Don't You Evah" (Ga Ga Ga Ga Ga, 2007)	Daniel; Eno; McCarthy	3:33
4.	"Inside Out" (They Want My Soul, 2014)	Dave Fridmann; Spoon	5:03
5.	"The Way We Get By" (Kill the Moonlight, 2002)	Daniel; Eno; McCarthy	2:39
6.	"The Underdog" (Ga Ga Ga Ga Ga, 2007)	Jon Brion; Spoon	3:39
7.	"Hot Thoughts" (Hot Thoughts, 2017)	Fridmann; Spoon	3:40
8.	"I Summon You" (Gimme Fiction, 2005)	Daniel; Eno; McCarthy	3:37
9.	"Rent I Pay" (They Want My Soul, 2014)	Fridmann; Spoon	3:09
10.	"You Got Yr Cherry Bomb" (Ga Ga Ga Ga Ga, 2007)	Daniel; Eno; McCarthy	2:50
11.	"Got Nuffin" (Transference, 2010)	Daniel; Eno	3:42
12.	"Everything Hits at Once" (Girls Can Tell, 2001)	Daniel; Eno; McCarthy	3:21
13.	"No Bullets Spent" (Newly recorded track, 2019)	Mark Rankin; Spoon	3:40
Total length:			45:39

== Personnel ==
- Britt Daniel – lead vocals (all tracks), guitar, bass, keyboards, percussion
- Jim Eno − drums, percussion (all tracks)
- Rob Pope – bass, guitar, keyboards (2-4, 6, 7, 9, 10, 11, 13)
- Alex Fischel – keyboards, guitar (2, 4, 7, 9, 13)
- Joshua Zarbo – bass (5, 12)
- Eric Harvey – piano, keyboards (3, 6, 9, 10), guitar (2, 4)
- Gerardo Larios – bass, percussion (13).

== Charts ==
Chart (2019)	Peak position
Scottish Albums (OCC)	86
US Independent Albums (Billboard)	15
US Vinyl Albums (Billboard)	13
