= Stranger than Fiction =

Stranger than Fiction may refer to:

== Film and television ==
- Stranger than Fiction (1921 film), a film starring Katherine MacDonald
- Stranger than Fiction (1930 film), a film featuring George Foley
- Stranger than Fiction (1934 film), a newsreel directed by Charles E. Ford
- Stranger than Fiction (1994 film), a documentary directed by Nicholas Briggs
- Stranger than Fiction (2000 film), an American comedy-thriller directed by Eric Bross
- Stranger than Fiction (2006 film), an American fantasy comedy-drama directed by Marc Forster
- Stranger than Fiction (company), an Australian film production company co-founded by producer Jennifer Peedom
- "Stranger Than Fiction" (Doctors), a 2004 television episode
- "Stranger Than Fiction" (Forever Knight), a 1994 television episode

== Literature ==
- Stranger than Fiction: True Stories, a 2004 book by Chuck Palahniuk
- Stranger than Fiction, a 1959 book by Dennis Wheatley

== Music ==
- Stranger than Fiction, an American band that included Elliott Smith

=== Albums ===
- Stranger than Fiction (Bad Religion album) or the title song (see below), 1994
- Stranger than Fiction (John Surman Quartet album), 1994
- Stranger than Fiction (Keith LeBlanc album), 1989
- Stranger than Fiction (Ultra Nate album), 2000
- Stranger than Fiction (compilation album), featuring members of the Rock Bottom Remainders, 1998
- Stranger than Fiction (mixtape), by Kevin Gates, 2013
- Stranger than Fiction (soundtrack), from the 2006 film
- Stranger than Fiction, a demo by Sabbat, 1987

=== Songs ===
- "Stranger than Fiction" (Bad Religion song), 1994
- "Stranger than Fiction" (Five Finger Death Punch song), 2008
- "Stranger than Fiction" (Joe Jackson song), 1991
- "Stranger than Fiction", by Katharine McPhee from Hysteria
- "Stranger than Fiction", by moe. from Tin Cans & Car Tires
- "Stranger than Fiction", by Split Enz from Mental Notes

== See also ==
- Truth Stranger Than Fiction, a 1915 drama film
