= Memory Dust =

EP by Spoon
- Released: June 13, 2023
- Genre: Indie rock
- Length: 13:39
- Label: Matador
- Producer: Spoon; Mark Rankin; Britt Daniel

Spoon chronology
Lucifer on the Moon (2022)	Memory Dust (2023)

Singles from Memory Dust
- 1. "Sugar Babies" Released: May 16, 2023

Memory Dust is the eighth extended play by the American indie rock band Spoon, released digitally on June 13, 2023 via Matador Records. It was produced by the band with Mark Rankin, except for the cover of Bo Diddley's "She's Fine, She's Mine", produced by band member Britt Daniel. Led by the single "Sugar Babies" on May 16, the three-track EP was met with positive reception from critics upon release.

== Background and composition ==
The EP consists of three tracks that started as unfinished recordings from the sessions for the band's most recent studio album, Lucifer on the Sofa (2022). Upon completing their tour in promotion of the album, they returned to the studio to finish the material, which includes the original songs "Sugar Babies" and "Silver Girl" and the Bo Diddley cover "She's Fine, She's Mine". Mark Rankin, who previously worked with the band as a producer on Lucifer on the Sofa, produced the EP's original compositions with Spoon. Otherwise, band member Britt Daniel produced the Bo Diddley cover. In addition to Lucifer on the Sofa, whose artwork shares a similar color scheme with the EP's cover, Memory Dust also follows two other releases from 2022: the Wild EP and the remix album Lucifer on the Moon.

Memory Dust, like much of the band's work, is an indie rock record. The opener, "Sugar Babies", starts the EP with studio chatter, including the proclamation "We're rolling!" The music itself begins with acoustic guitar and piano, later followed by an extended outro. The EP continues with the blues-tinged cover of "She's Fine, She's Mine" and then concludes with "Silver Girl".

== Single and release ==
On May 16, 2023, Spoon announced the EP with its artwork, tracklisting, and lead single "Sugar Babies". Memory Dust was subsequently released on June 13 on digital platforms through Matador Records.

== Critical reception ==
Professional ratings
Review scores
Source	Rating
Sputnikmusic	3.7/5
Under the Radar	8/10

Writing for Under the Radar, Matt the Raven rated Memory Dust eight out of ten and said that the "terrific, if not totally innovative" record continues Spoon's streak of "unmatched consistency" in the world of indie rock. They opined that the Bo Diddley cover demonstrates the band's efficiency in creating mood-driven music, and they singled out the closer "Silver Girl" as the record's best. On Sputnikmusic, emeritus reviewer Sunnyvale thought that while all of the songs were of decent quality, the first two were "fairly unremarkable", largely reserving praise for the third and final track "Silver Girl". Citing the song's "catchy melody and all-around tight presentation," they considered it to be one of the band's recent best, which "alone makes [the EP] worth the price of admission". Commenting on the original tracks, Bill Pearis of BrooklynVegan said that "Sugar Babies" meets the quality set by the best songs from their previous album Lucifer on the Sofa (2022), and the "strutting slow-burn" of "Silver Girl" plays to the band's strengths.

== Track listing ==
Memory Dust track listing
No.	Title	Lyrics	Music	Length
1.	"Sugar Babies"	Britt Daniel	Alex Fischel	5:45
2.	"She's Fine, She's Mine" (Bo Diddley cover)	Ellas McDaniel	McDaniel	3:12
3.	"Silver Girl"	Daniel	Ben Trokan	4:40
Total length:				13:39

== Personnel ==
Credits are adapted from Apple Music.

=== Spoon ===
- Britt Daniel – vocals (all tracks); acoustic guitar (1, 2); keyboards, percussion (1); organ (2, 3); bass, electric guitar, shaker (2)
- Jim Eno – drums (all tracks), percussion (1)
- Gerardo Larios – organ, percussion (1); electric guitar (2, 3)
- Alex Fischel – keyboards (1, 3), piano (1), electric guitar (3)
- Ben Trokan – bass (1, 3)

=== Additional musicians ===
- Mark Rankin (1)
- Joseph Woullard – French horn (1)
- Jennifer Marigliano – shaker (2)

=== Technical ===
- Spoon – production (1, 3), mixing (1)
- Mark Rankin – production (1, 3)
- Britt Daniel – production (2), engineering (all tracks)
- Chris Longwood – engineering (all tracks)
- Grant Eppley – engineering (all tracks)
- Jim Eno – engineering (1), mixing (2, 3)
- Mike McCarthy – mixing (1)
