= Robbers on High Street =

American rock band

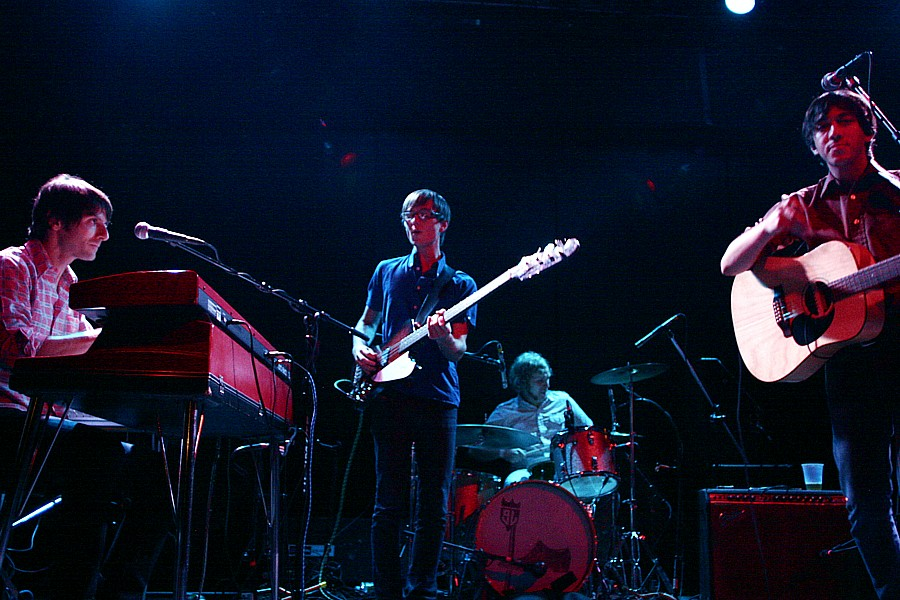

Background information
- Origin: New York, New York, United States
- Genre: Indie rock
- Years active: 2002–2012
- Label: New Line
- Past members: Ben Trokan; Steven Mercado; Morgan King; Mikey Post; David Sherman; Jeremy Phillips; Tomer Danan
- Website: www.robbersonhighstreet.com

Robbers on High Street were an American rock band from Brooklyn, New York, which formed in 2002. The band released three studio albums across their ten years together.

== History ==
Robbers on High Street began performing publicly during the summer of 2002, but the band's roots stretch back much further. Ben Trokan and Steve "Sparky" Mercado have been friends since their preteen years growing up in the upstate New York town of Poughkeepsie. Both Mercado and Trokan shared a recent familial relocation from the Bronx and Manhattan, respectively, and a love of Led Zeppelin. Ten years later Trokan returned to New York City for college and through mutual friends met and began playing with drummer Tomer Danan. In Poughkeepsie, Mercado reconnected with Jeremy Phillips, an old school friend. Robbers on High Street—the name came from a lyric of one of the band's early, discarded compositions—was officially born when the four began playing together.

The band was quickly signed by Scratchie/New Line Records at the end of 2003. Fine Lines, the band's debut EP was released in March 2004 and was co-produced by Peter Katis (The National, Interpol, Mercury Rev), as was their first full-length album, Tree City, with additional production from Britt Myers (Dressy Bessy, Chairlift). Tree City was released in February 2005 and Phillips was replaced shortly thereafter by Florida native Morgan King. In addition to playing bass, King is proficient in brass instruments and occasionally plays them on stage. The band toured for most of 2005 with Cake, Hot Hot Heat, Sloan, and Brendan Benson. The album was met with strong reviews. Several songs off Tree City ("Love Underground", "Big Winter", and "Japanese Girls") landed in several films and TV shows; the band also had two appearances on The Carson Daly Show.

In the summer of 2006 the band parted ways with drummer Tomer Danan and went in the studio as a trio with Trokan taking over drumming duties to record their follow up LP, Grand Animals. For this album the band connected with Italian film composer Daniele Luppi, known mostly for his string arrangements and orchestral work with Danger Mouse (Gnarls Barkley, Broken Bells) and pop artists like John Legend. The band recorded in New York and mixed with Jeff Peters (The Beach Boys, Goldspot) in Los Angeles. The new collaboration allowed them to explore broader sonic landscapes-utilizing King's range of musicianship-with dynamic and varied sounding songs showcasing the bands' of obsession with 60s and 70s AM radio. Grand Animals was released on July 24, 2007, and the band (now a quintet with the addition of drummer Mikey Post (Naomi Shelton & The Gospel Queens, The Jay Vons) and keyboardist David Sherman (Goodbye Girl Friday, Grand Mal, The Silent League)) did several tours with The Redwalls, The Sea and Cake, Fountains of Wayne and Great Northern. Reviews of the album and tour were mostly positive.

Scratchie/New Line Records folded shortly after the New Year. After an extended rest, Robbers on High Street returned to form in 2008 - playing shows (sometimes as Electric Light Orchestra), writing new songs and recording several covers - Emitt Rhodes, The Style Council, and even New Edition - for various compilation releases. After purchasing a TASCAM MS-16 1" 16 track, the band entered the studio in October 2009 to begin work on their third full-length album. Produced by Trokan with engineer Matt Shane (Flight of the Conchords, Rosanne Cash), they settled in at Tommy Brenneck's (The Budos Band, Menahan Street Band) Dunham Studio for mixdown. Delving deeper into their Anglophilia a la The Pretty Things and the blue-eyed power of Reg King and The Action, this was the current line-up's first proper recording session, drawing little help from the outside save that of a horn section borrowed from Daptone Records. In June 2010, the 7" single Electric Eye b/w Face In The Fog, two tracks from the yet unreleased upcoming album tentatively titled Hey There Golden Hair, was released on Engine Room Recordings. Some brief Northeast tours in the summer and fall in support followed, as well as an appearance at the 2010 CMJ Music Marathon.

The band became inactive some time after the release of their Anything Could Happen EP in 2012. Trokan joined Spoon as their touring bassist in 2019, replacing Rob Pope, before eventually being brought in as a full-time member of the band in 2021. In December 2021 co-founder Steven Mercado died at the age of 43 in Hopewell Junction, New York.

== Discography ==
=== Albums ===
- Tree City (2005, New Line Records)
- Grand Animals (2007, New Line Records)
- Hey There Golden Hair (2011, Rocco Grecco Records)

=== Singles and EPs ===
- Love Underground (demo) b/w New Evil 7" (2003, Scratchie Records)
- Fine Lines EP (2004, New Line Records)
- "The Fatalist and Friends" (2006, New Line Records)
- Season's Greetings (Holiday song) (2008)
- Electric Eye b/w Face In The Fog 7" (2010, Engine Room Recordings)
- Anything Could Happen EP (2012)

=== Compilations ===
- Four Christmases soundtrack (2008, New Line Records / 2009 Watertower Music) song: "Season's Greetings"
- Wedding Crashers soundtrack (2005, New Line Records) song: "Love Underground"
- Just Friends soundtrack (2005, New Line Records) song: "Big Winter"
- Georgia Rule soundtrack (2007, New Line Records) song: "The Fatalist"
- Guilt by Association Vol. 2 compilation (2008, Engine Room Recordings) song: "Cool It Now" (cover)
- The Lifted Brow, No. 4: Fake Bookshelf book + dbl CD compilation (2009, The Lifted Brow) song: "The Duke's Dilemma"
- Buffet Libre Rewind 2 compilation (2009) song: "Shout to the Top" (cover)
