= The Ramainz =

- Also known as: The Remains (1996–1999)
- Origin: United States
- Genres: Punk rock
- Years active: 1996–2002

The Ramainz were an American tribute band to the Ramones. Its members included Dee Dee Ramone, Marky Ramone, Dee Dee's wife Barbara Zampini, and C. J. Ramone. They were known as The Remains until 1999 but had to change the spelling due to another band already using the name. They released one live album entitled Live in N.Y.C. on October 8, 2002, four months after Dee Dee Ramone's death on June 5.

== Former members ==
- Dee Dee Ramone – vocals, guitar (1996–2002)
- Marky Ramone – drums (1996–2002)
- Barbara Zampini (Barbara Ramone) – bass, vocals (1996–2002)
- C. J. Ramone – guitar and vocals (1996)
- Ben Trokan (from Marky Ramone and the Intruders) – guitar (1997–2002)

== Discography ==
- Live in N.Y.C. (2002)
