= I Want You to Stay =

Single by Maxïmo Park

from the album A Certain Trigger
- B-side: "La Quinta"
- Released: 20 February 2006
- Recorded: Autumn 2004
- Genre: Post-punk revival
- Length: 3:12 (radio edit); 3:44 (album version)
- Label: Warp
- Songwriters: Lukas Wooller (Music), Paul Smith (Lyrics)
- Producer: Paul Epworth

Maxïmo Park singles chronology
"Apply Some Pressure" (2005)	"I Want You to Stay" (2006)	"Our Velocity" (2007)

Music video
- "I Want You to Stay" on YouTube

"I Want You to Stay" is the fifth single released from English rock band Maxïmo Park, taken from their debut album A Certain Trigger. It was the last single from the album, released on 20 February 2006. "I Want You to Stay" reached number 21 on the UK Singles Chart and number one on the UK Indie Chart.

A B-side from Maxïmo Park's February 2005 single for "Apply Some Pressure" features a song called "I Want You to Leave," a play on the title of "I Want You to Stay." The song is also included on the band's 2005 compilation album Missing Songs. A music video for the song, of which the band doesn't appear in, premiered prior to its release as a single on 10 January 2006, and was directed by Ramon Bloomberg.

== Track listing ==
CD (WAP201CD)

1. "I Want You to Stay" (Edit) – 3:12
2. "La Quinta" – 2:38
3. "I Want You to Stay" (Field Music / J. Xaverre Remix) – 4:06

7" #1 (7WAP201, turquoise vinyl)

1. "I Want You to Stay" (Original Demo) – 5:16
2. "I Want You to Stay" (Field Music / J. Xaverre Remix) – 4:06

7" #2 (7WAP201R, white vinyl)

1. "I Want You to Stay" (Cristian Vogel Remix) – 4:29
2. "La Quinta" – 2:38
