= I Turn My Camera On =

2005 single by Spoon

- UK 7-inch single cover art

Single by Spoon

from the album Gimme Fiction
- B-side: Demo version; "You Was It"; "Carryout Kids"
- Released: March 30, 2005
- Recorded: July – September 2004
- Studio: Public Hi-Fi (Austin, Texas)
- Genre: Indie rock; dance-punk; funk rock; disco; soul
- Length: 3:34
- Label: Matador; Merge
- Songwriter: Britt Daniel
- Producers: Britt Daniel; Jim Eno; Mike McCarthy

Spoon singles chronology
"The Way We Get By" (2003)	"I Turn My Camera On" (2005)	"My First Time Volume 3" (2005)

Music video
- "I Turn My Camera On" on YouTube

Alternative cover
- US promotional 7-inch cover art

"I Turn My Camera On" is a song by American indie rock band Spoon, the third track on their fifth studio album, Gimme Fiction (2005). It was first released as a download single on March 30, 2005, and later as a 7-inch and CD single on July 4, 2005. It was released through Merge Records in the US and Matador Records in the UK, who also distributed the download release. The song was written by band frontman Britt Daniel and produced by Daniel, Jim Eno, and Mike McCarthy. Daniel wrote the song after hearing "Take Me Out" by Franz Ferdinand, and was influenced by the works of Prince to sing with falsetto vocals on the track. Daniel's lyrics are about "emotional distance", centering around a narrator who documents their surrounding world with a camera instead of actually engaging with it. Musically, the band focused more on creating a sound influenced by dance and soul music.

"I Turn My Camera On" received positive remarks from music critics, with one writer calling it one of Spoon's signature songs. Commercially, the song peaked at No. 194 on the UK Singles Chart and No. 31 on the Billboard Hot Singles Sales chart. It has been featured in an episode of The Simpsons, a commercial for car manufacturer Jaguar, and a viral video featuring the miniature research robot Keepon dancing to the song. It was also included by Spoon on their greatest hits album, Everything Hits at Once (2019).

== Background ==
Spoon frontman Britt Daniel wrote "I Turn My Camera On" in the same Austin, Texas, apartment where he wrote "The Way We Get By". It was one of the last songs he had written for Gimme Fiction before the band started to record at drummer Jim Eno's Public Hi-Fi studio in Austin. It was, however, the first song they recorded, as Daniel felt like the song was bound to be the album's lead single. He was directly inspired by Franz Ferdinand's 2004 song "Take Me Out". He chose to explore their music after discovering that his ex-girlfriend, Eleanor Friedberger, was dating their frontman, Alex Kapranos. Enamored by the song, Daniel then attempted to write a song with a similar yet distinct groove to that of the one in "Take Me Out". The first words Daniel came up with for the song were "I turn my camera on", not knowing what it would mean.

== Composition ==
"I Turn My Camera On"
This sample displays the song's dance-oriented instrumental as well as Britt Daniel's falsetto vocals.

In an interview with NPR Music, Daniel said that the song is about "emotional distance", adding that it is centered around "the idea of, instead of engaging with the world, you're holding a camera up, which, a) puts a camera in front of your face, and b) puts some distance between you and the outside world. And you're sort of documenting the world." He also felt that the line "You made me untouchable for life, and you wasn't polite" called back to people who "might have led [him] down that path", adding that "I don't think I'm untouchable, but sometimes I've felt that way." Heather Phares of AllMusic noted that the song also touches upon voyeurism.

The song was produced by Daniel, Eno, and Mike McCarthy. The band had taken a different approach to the writing the song's music, focusing on creating a more dance- and soul-oriented sound. Daniel performed electric guitar, bass guitar, and keyboards on the song, while Eno performed drums and developed the song's drum pattern, which features upbeat hi-hats. Daniel chose to sing the lyrics with falsetto vocals due to his fondness of Prince, who frequently used falsetto in his songs. When the song was finished, Daniel remarked that it "felt like a hit". "I Turn My Camera On" has been described musically as indie rock, dance-punk, funk rock, and disco. Both Phares and Eric Carr, the latter of whom writing for Pitchfork, compared the song to "Emotional Rescue" by the Rolling Stones. Meanwhile, Tamec of Tiny Mix Tapes felt that it was reminiscent of the works of Beck.

== Release ==
Spoon created a music video to promote the song, which was directed by Autumn de Wilde and Wyatt Troll. "I Turn My Camera On" received five different single releases. The first release came on March 30, 2005, as a download single through the website of Matador Records. Later on, in the United States, a promotional 7-inch single was released through Merge Records. It featured a demo version of "I Turn My Camera On" and the non-album track "You Was It" on its B-side. In the United Kingdom, Matador handled the releases. They released a 7-inch single featuring just the demo version on the B-side as well as a CD single that also included both "You Was It" and another non-album track, "Carryout Kids". Both singles were released on July 4, 2005. The song was also released as a promotional DVD single in both the US, through Merge, and the UK, through Matador, containing the song's music video. The song was later featured on the band's 2019 greatest hits album, Everything Hits at Once.

"I Turn My Camera On" has also seen appearances in different forms of media since its release. Britt Daniel has stated that he is usually cautious when it comes to licensing Spoon's music to brands. However, he allowed "I Turn My Camera On" to be used in an episode of The Simpsons, which he is a big fan of. In "Any Given Sundance", episode 18 of the show's nineteenth season, the song is played fittingly in the background while Lisa Simpson documents her family and the town of Springfield with a camera. It was also used in an episode of Veronica Mars, "Cheatty Cheatty Bang Bang," a commercial for car manufacturer Jaguar, and a viral video featuring the miniature research robot Keepon, in which the robot dances to the song. The Keepon video has garnered millions of views on YouTube since its release.

== Reception ==
"I Turn My Camera On" received positive reviews from writers. Some critics applauded its similarities to Prince. Eric Carr of Pitchfork called it a "Prince-tastic masterpiece", while Amir Nezar of the Cokemachineglow blog enjoyed the song's "Prince-funk minimalism" as well as its "hip-shaking swagger". Carr also lauded the track as "one of the most breathtaking songs Spoon has ever produced". At PopMatters, Zeth Lundy wrote that Gimme Fiction "cements it mobilization" with the song, while David Marchese called it "discofantastic" and wrote that "the album draws strength from its refusal to be pinned down". Sandy Boer of Delusions of Adequacy called it the most adventurous song from the album. At AllMusic, Heather Phares complimented the band's ability to make a song about "voyeurism and emotional distance" while also giving it an "irresistible groove" at the same time. In the Rolling Stone's original review for Gimme Fiction, Lauren Gitlin complimented the song's "sexy four-chord stomp", adding that the track sounds like a song by Queen but with vocals from Michael Jackson.

Though the song itself received positive remarks from writers, the single release as a whole received some criticism. Pitchfork writer David Raposa thought negatively of the single and gave it a 3.4/10 score. He began his review by claiming that fans who paid import price for the CD single (US$9) were ripped off. He added that the single was redundant and that fans were better off pre-ordering the special edition of Gimme Fiction, which came with the single's additional tracks, "Carryout Kids" and "You Was It". Raposa thought somewhat positively of "Carryout Kids", while labeling "You Was It" an "obnoxious, amped-up version" of "Was It You?" from Gimme Fiction.

== Track listing ==
Download single (Matador)

No.	Title	Length
1.	"I Turn My Camera On"	3:34

UK 7-inch single (Matador OLE662-7)

Side A
No.	Title	Length
1.	"I Turn My Camera On"	3:39

Side B
No.	Title	Length
1.	"I Turn My Camera On" (demo version)	2:07

UK CD single (Matador OLE662-2)

No.	Title	Length
1.	"I Turn My Camera On"	3:34
2.	"Carryout Kids"	2:45
3.	"You Was It"	3:58

US 7-inch promotional single (Merge MRG265-7)

Side A
No.	Title	Length
1.	"I Turn My Camera On"	3:39

Side B
No.	Title	Length
1.	"You Was It"	3:56
2.	"I Turn My Camera On" (demo version)	2:07

== Charts ==
Chart performance for "I Turn My Camera On"
Chart (2005)	Peak position
UK Singles (Official Charts Company)	194
US Hot Singles Sales (Billboard)	31

== Personnel ==
Personnel adapted from Gimme Fiction credits.

Spoon

- Britt Daniel – vocals, electric guitar, bass guitar, keyboards, sound effects
- Jim Eno – drums

Additional musicians

- Eric Bachmann – backing vocals
- Mike McCarthy – snaps

Technical personnel

- Greg Calbi – mastering
- Britt Daniel – producer, mixer
- James Vollentine - editing, mixer
- Jim Eno – producer, mixer, engineer
- Mike McCarthy – producer, mixer, engineer

== Release history ==
Region	Date	Label	Format	Catalog no.	Ref.
United States	March 30, 2005	Matador	Download	—N/a	
United States	July 4, 2005	Merge	7-inch	MRG265-7	
United Kingdom	July 4, 2005	Matador	7-inch	OLE662-7	
United Kingdom	July 4, 2005	Matador	CD	OLE662-2	
