= James Russell (director) =

James Russell is a British Award Winning Multi Camera Director of live music, events, promos, studio and DVD content. With over 23 years of experience as a Director, he now works on a freelance basis. He has recorded live music performances from a diverse range of artists such as Liam Gallagher, Morrissey, Katy Perry, Jay Z, Coldplay, Ellie Goulding, Bastille, Stereophonics, Backstreet Boys, Editors, QOTSA, Duran Duran, The Cure and KSI to name a few.

Born in Manchester, England, James moved down to London in the 1990s and has worked across an array of music and television disciplines; from live concerts and events, award shows, television programs and music documentaries. With vast experience he always provides a wide range of styles and innovative approaches to live video and film, from intimate gigs to large arenas and festivals. With each performance, he manages to individually craft the visuals, bringing a unique and audience point of view to each and every project.

He began his career at MTV Europe where he moved into directing live music and shows for both VH1 and MTV World Stage. The past few years alone has seen James work on a multitude of BluRays and musical capture with artists such as Bastille, Foo Fighters, Muse, The Killers, Tom Petty, Snow Patrol, Paloma Faith, James Bay, Charli XCX, Beyonce, Usher, Kings of Leon and Elbow. He continues to Direct Award shows, Events, TV Shows and live cinecasts. He has also recorded two MTV Unplugged shows for Liam Gallagher and Bastille.

As a respected freelancer, he makes sure he works closely with the artist and performer to deliver the correct visual balance and tone. Known for his high-octane style in his performances, James' work spans short film, feature-length documentary, advertising and creative direction. A host of high-profile clients includes Red Bull, Burberry, Rihanna's River Island Collection, Sony, Xbox, Schwarzkopf, Jaguar Land Rover and Stella McCartney.

Other notable projects include shooting the worldwide release of Morrissey: 25 Live, Def Leppard Live at the O2 Kasabian Summer Solstice Wolfmother, Manic Street Preachers Postcards From A Young Man, Snow Patrol's A Hundred Million Suns, studio performances for The Cure's 4:13 Dream album, Steve Angello's "Show Me Love" promo and ATL Live from the Ulster Hall for the BBC.

Shows and channels he has worked on include BBC, T4, 4Music, ITV, Channel 4, Sky, BBC, Sky Arts Channel 5 and MTV.

== Awards ==
- Music Week Awards Winner 2014
- NME Awards Nominee 2015
- UKMVA Nominated 2010 2011 2012 2013 2014
- RTS Winner 2009
- Nominated for Best Live DVD - Maxïmo Park "Found on Film"
- Vodafone Live Music Awards 2006/2007
- NME Awards 2007
