= Got Nuffin =

2009 extended play by Spoon

EP by Spoon
- Released: June 30, 2009
- Recorded: 2008
- Genre: Indie rock
- Length: 11:06
- Label: Merge Records
- Producer: Britt Daniel; Jim Eno

Spoon chronology
Don't You Evah (2008)	Got Nuffin (2009)	Transference (2010)

Got Nuffin is the sixth EP by indie rock band Spoon, released by Merge Records on June 30, 2009. The title single, which was recorded at Rare Book Room in Brooklyn with Deerhunter engineer Nicolas Vernhes, reached #43 on Billboard's Rock Songs chart in May 2010, and subsequently appeared on Spoon's 2010 album Transference.

== Reception ==
The EP received a rating of 7/10 from Pitchfork Media.

== Track listing ==
1. "Got Nuffin" – 3:56
2. "Tweakers" – 3:43
3. "Stroke Their Brains" – 3:31
4. "Tweakers (Remix)" – 4:02

== In the media ==
The title track was used in the closing scene of the seventh season finale of the medical drama series House, as well as the episode "Chuck Versus Operation Awesome" of the comedy-drama series Chuck.
