= A Certain Trigger =

Studio album by Maxïmo Park
- Released: 16 May 2005
- Recorded: Autumn 2004
- Studios: Eastcote Studios (London); 2khz Studios (London)
- Genres: Indie rock; post-punk revival; new wave
- Length: 39:33
- Label: Warp
- Producer: Paul Epworth

Maxïmo Park chronology
What is Truth and Lies... Garcia Marquez (2002)	A Certain Trigger (2005)	Missing Songs (2005)

Singles from A Certain Trigger
- 1. "The Coast Is Always Changing" Released: 22 November 2004; 2. "Apply Some Pressure" Released: 21 February 2005; 3. "Graffiti" Released: 2 May 2005; 4. "Going Missing" Released: 18 July 2005; 5. "Apply Some Pressure" Released: 31 October 2005 (re-release); 6. "I Want You to Stay" Released: 20 February 2006

A Certain Trigger is the debut studio album by English indie rock band Maxïmo Park. It was released on 16 May 2005 through Warp Records.

== Album information ==
The title for the album comes from the song "Once, a Glimpse".

The songs "The Coast Is Always Changing", "Apply Some Pressure", "Graffiti", "Going Missing" and "I Want You to Stay" were released as singles.

The censored version of "Apply Some Pressure" was used on the soundtracks of the video games FIFA 06, Burnout Revenge, and SSX on Tour. An instrumental version of "Going Missing" was used during the end credits of the movie Stranger than Fiction.

The album has received Platinum status in the UK. When it was originally released, a limited-edition version was available with a bonus CD containing a live performance in Japan. A Certain Trigger sold over 500,000 copies worldwide.

In 2007, frontman Paul Smith contributed vocals to a Pop soul remix of "Apply Some Pressure" by musician, DJ and producer Mark Ronson for his covers album Version. Smith recorded the vocals for Ronson after he invited him to perform on the instrumental he had made based on the band's original.

In 2009, the Warp20 (Recreated) compilation included a cover version of the song "Acrobat" by Seefeel.

== Reception ==
Professional ratings
Aggregate scores
Source	Rating
Metacritic	75/100
Review scores
Source	Rating
AllMusic	4.5/5 stars
Entertainment Weekly	B
The Independent	5/5 stars
The Irish Times	4/5 stars
Mojo	3/5 stars
The New Zealand Herald	4/5 stars
NME	7/10
Pitchfork	8.4/10
Rolling Stone	3/5 stars
Uncut	3/5 stars

Pitchfork's Sam Ubl wrote that Maxïmo Park "play jaunty, precise power pop with punk's antipathies, exuding a tentative cool'. CMJ wrote, "These five lads resurrect the trembling, trebly power chords and literate sensibilities of bands like Wire and the Fall... Maximo Park's brand of guitar pop is distinctly British and pogo-ready."

A Certain Trigger was nominated for the 2005 Mercury Prize.

== Track listing ==
All tracks are written by Duncan Lloyd and Paul Smith, except where noted.

No.	Title	Length
1.	"Signal and Sign"	2:25
2.	"Apply Some Pressure"	3:19
3.	"Graffiti"	3:05
4.	"Postcard of a Painting"	2:14
5.	"Going Missing"	3:41
6.	"I Want You to Stay" (Lukas Wooller, Smith)	3:44
7.	"Limassol" (Archis Tiku, Smith)	3:42
8.	"The Coast Is Always Changing"	3:19
9.	"The Night I Lost My Head" (Smith)	1:51
10.	"Once, a Glimpse"	3:03
11.	"Now I'm All Over the Shop"	2:23
12.	"Acrobat" (Wooller, Smith)	4:42
13.	"Kiss You Better" (Smith)	2:05

Limited edition bonus disc (Live in Tokyo)
No.	Title	Length
1.	"Signal and Sign"	2:49
2.	"The Coast Is Always Changing"	3:27
3.	"Graffiti"	3:04
4.	"I Want You to Stay" (Wooller, Smith)	3:43
5.	"Limassol" (Tiku, Smith)	3:41
6.	"Once, a Glimpse"	3:15
7.	"Kiss You Better" (Smith)	2:26

== Charts ==
Chart performance for A Certain Trigger
Chart (2005)	Peak position
Austrian Albums (Ö3 Austria)	70
French Albums (SNEP)	102
German Albums (Offizielle Top 100)	25
Irish Albums (IRMA)	67
Scottish Albums (Official Charts)	76
UK Albums (Official Charts)	15
UK Independent Albums (Official Charts)	1
