= Marky Ramone and the Intruders =

- Origin: United States
- Genres: Punk rock
- Years active: 1996–1999

Marky Ramone and the Intruders were an American punk rock band formed by drummer Marky Ramone after the retirement of the Ramones. The band is similar in sound to the Ramones but with a more powerful bass. The band released only two albums in its short existence. Todd Youth of Murphy's Law was the frontman for a short time.

== Former members ==
- Marky Ramone – drums
- Johnny Pisano – bass/vocals
- Howie Accused – guitar
- Alex Crank – guitar/vocals
- Ben Trokan – guitar/vocals
- Garrett Uhlenbrock, aka Skinny Bones – vocals
- Todd Youth – vocals, guitar

== Discography ==
- Marky Ramone and the Intruders (1996) – Thirsty Ear Recordings
- The Answer to Your Problems? (Don't Blame Me! in South America) (1999) – Rounder Records
