= Benny Trokan =

American instrumentalist and songwriter (born 1978)

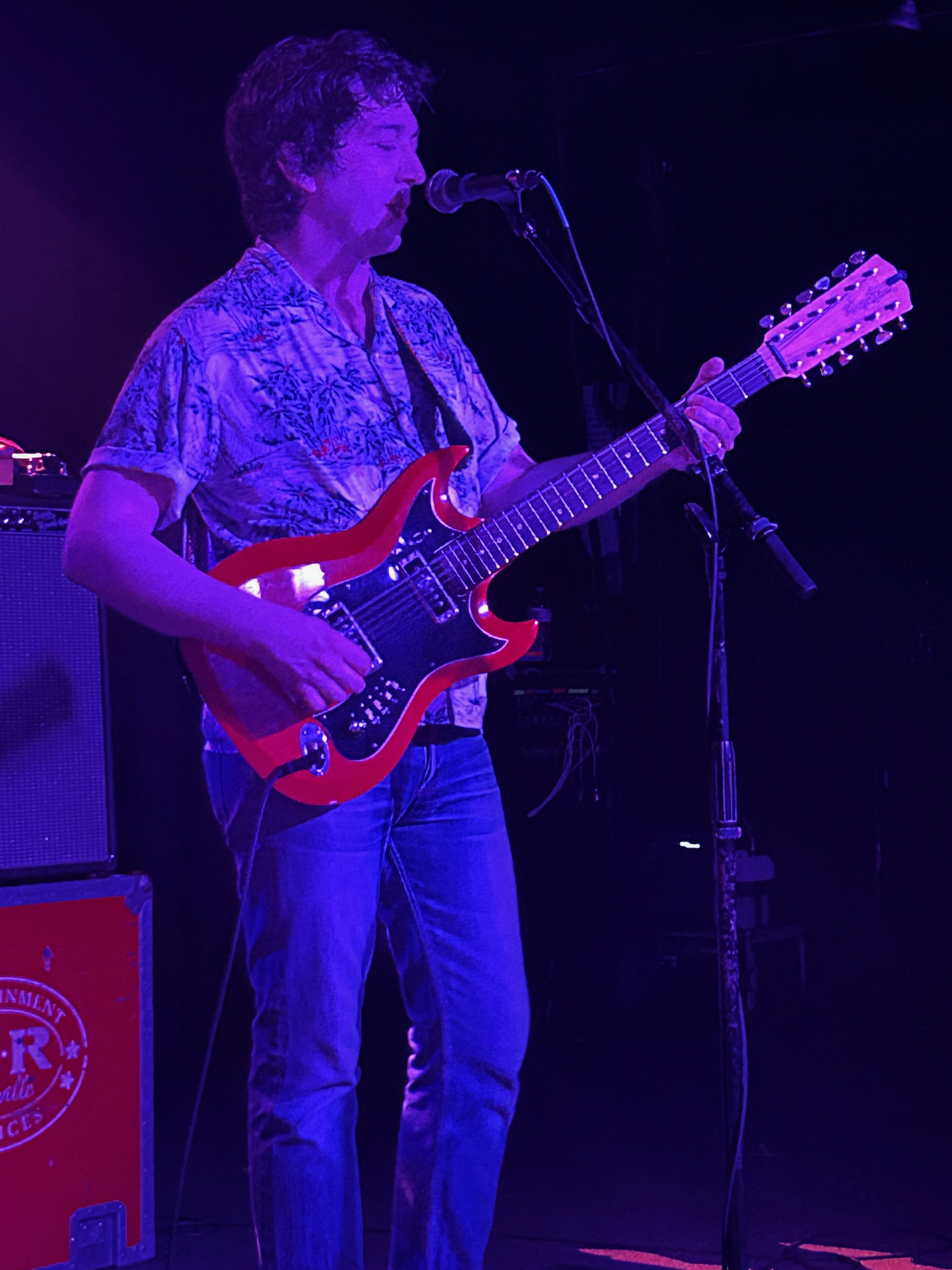
- Trokan in 2025

Background information
- Born: June 20, 1978 (age 48); New York City, U.S.
- Genres: Punk rock, indie rock, garage rock, soul
- Instruments: Bass guitar, twelve-string guitar, vocals, drums, electric guitar
- Years active: 1997–present
- Labels: Scratchie Records, New Line, Rocco Grecco, Merge Records, Daptone, Wick, Matador
- Member of: Spoon (since 2021)
- Formerly of: Robbers on High Street (2002–2012)

Benny Trokan (born June 20, 1978) is multi-instrumentalist, vocalist, songwriter and producer best known for co-founding and fronting Robbers on High Street, and for playing bass guitar in the band Spoon, sharing in Spoon's 2023 Grammy nomination for Best Rock Album. He has written, performed, and recorded music in a variety of styles such as punk, indie rock, and soul. In addition to Robbers on High Street and Spoon, Trokan has been part of Marky Ramone and the Intruders, Boy Morgan, The Jay Vons and Reigning Sound. He also records and performs with Lee Fields and the Expressions. In 2024, he released a solo album and embarked on a tour to promote it. Trokan continues to record and tour as a solo artist, and as part of both Spoon and Lee Fields & the Expressions.

== Early Life ==
Benny Trokan was born on June 20, 1978 in New York City. During his early childhood, which took place in Manhattan, he reports taking drum kit lessons and listening to his mother's records by artists such as The Beatles, Sam & Dave, and Dionne Warwick. By the time Trokan was in middle school, the family (Trokan, with his parents and younger sister) had moved to the Poughkeepsie area. There, Trokan met fellow student Steve Mercado, and the two became friends over a shared love of Led Zeppelin. While attending Arlington High School in LaGrange, NY, Trokan reports that he began teaching himself to play electric guitar. He and Mercado played in various student rock bands.

== Career ==
In 1997, after high school, Trokan moved back to New York City and joined Marky Ramone and the Intruders on guitar. This band was founded by drummer and fellow Brooklyn resident Marky Ramone of the Ramones, and continued the Ramones' style of short and fast punk songs. Trokan performed with the band from 1997 through 2000. Around this time he also performed with Dee Dee Ramone in his project with Marky, The Ramainz, appearing on a live album The Ramainz: Live in N.Y.C.

In 2002, Trokan began working with his childhood friend Steve Mercado again to form the band Robbers on High Street. Supplying lead vocals, guitar, and keyboard, Trokan and the band released the EP Fine Lines in March, 2004 on Scratchie Records (which folded into New Line Records, now WaterTower Music).

Trokan gained more national attention in 2005 with Robbers on High Street's first full-length album, Tree City (Scratchie / New Line Records) and subsequent tour. Trokan wrote or co-wrote all songs on the LP. The same was true for the band's 2007 LP from Scratchie / New Line Records, Grand Animals, on which Trokan also played "75% of the instruments." He also co-produced 2011's Hey There Golden Hair, while continuing as frontman, guitarist and songwriter. For this and their next and final release, 2012's Anything Could Happen EP, he appears to have established a label, Rocco Grecco, which he would use later in his career as well.

During Robbers on High Street's final years, Trokan became the bassist for The Jay Vons, described as having an "evergreen sound" of "garage rock and soul." In 2011, the Jay Vons were tapped to back up Greg Cartwright in Reigning Sound, performing on 2011's EP, Abdication…For Your Love. Trokan additionally contributed to the "nostalgic pop" of the band Boy Morgan by playing drums on their 2012 self-titled EP and on tour dates in subsequent years. He was also the bassist on Reigning Sound's 2014 album Shattered, and embarked on a tour with the group. He played bass and contributed vocals on the single "It Was Wrong to Love You" by The Jay Vons plus members of Reigning Sound, recorded at Daptone Records. Trokan served as bassist and co-engineer on The Jay Vons' 2019 LP The Word. 2019 also saw Trokan touring with The Jay Vons, as well as playing guitar and touring with Lee Fields & The Expressions.

In 2017, while touring with fellow Daptone Records artist Charles Bradley, Trokan re-connected with Jim Eno (a friend Trokan had known since his 20's) of Spoon, one of the most critically acclaimed rock acts of the 21st century so far. To fill the role of departing bassist Rob Pope, Spoon recruited Trokan in 2019 to tour with them, and in 2021 Trokan became the band's official bass player. He joined the band in recording the Matador Records 2022 release, Lucifer on the Sofa. In 2023, he shared in the Best Rock Album Grammy nomination Spoon received for that album.

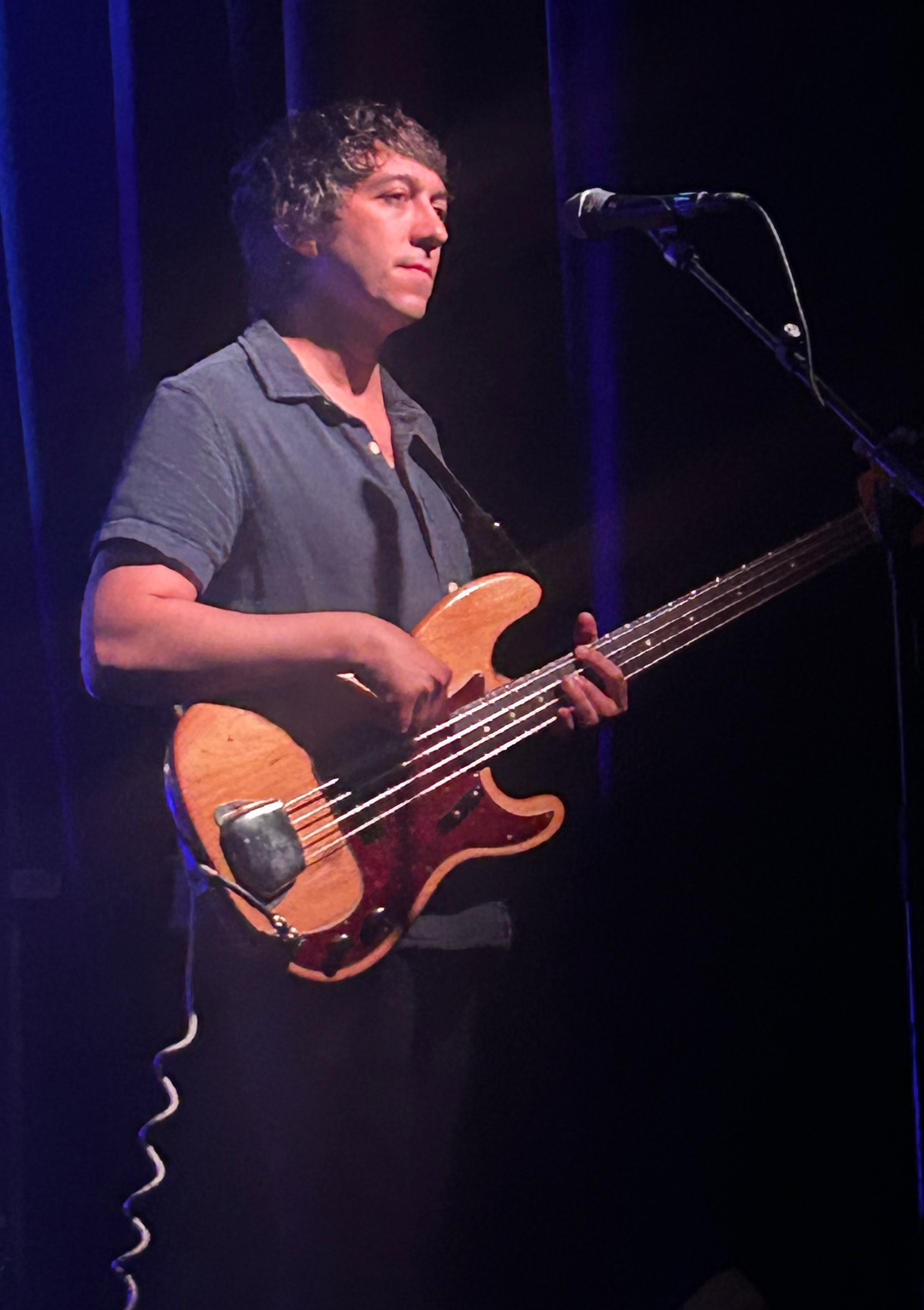
Trokan onstage in Santa Ana, California on August 26, 2025

Trokan embarked on solo and additional projects as well during this time. In July of 2022, he released an EP of solo work, Hey Lovers, on Daptone Records. He recorded as the bass musician on Lee Fields' 2022 album Sentimental Fool, also on Daptone Records. Trokan opened for Fields during the tour for that album, and has continued to tour with Lee Fields & the Expressions.

In August of 2024, Trokan released Do You Still Think Of Me, his first full-length solo LP, on Wick, an imprint of Daptone Records. Trokan wrote and produced the album, which was recorded by Daptone Records co-founder and Dap-Kings bandleader Gabe Roth (a.k.a. Bosco Mann) at Roth's studio in Riverside, CA, and at Daptone's House of Soul in Brooklyn. Described as "spaghetti soul rock" reminiscent of "late-’60s AM radio," the songs feature him on guitars and lead vocals, as well as some keyboard and percussion. The album attracted favorable reviews. Globally-recognized radio station KEXP added Do You Still Think of Me to rotation, after which the album charted at No. 49 on the station's Top 90.

Following release of the album, Trokan toured with fellow Daptone musicians The Budos Band, as well as members of The Jay Vons and Reigning Sound.

Trokan continues to tour as a solo artist, as well as to record, collaborate, and perform with Spoon and other musicians.

== Discography ==
Album	Release year	Artist	Role	Citation
"New Evil" / "Love Underground"	2003	Robbers on High Street	Songwriting, lead vocals, guitar, keyboard	
Fine Lines	2004	Robbers on High Street	Songwriting, lead vocals, guitar, keyboard	
Tree City	2005	Robbers on High Street	Songwriting, lead vocals, guitar, keyboard	
The Fatalist and Friends	2006	Robbers on High Street	Songwriting, lead vocals, guitar, keyboard	
Grand Animals	2007	Robbers on High Street	Songwriting, lead vocals, guitar, keyboard, drums	
"Maybe I Loved You" / "Never Take Me Back"	2010	The Jay Vons	Bass, vocals	
"Electric Eye" / "Face in the Fog"	2010	Robbers on High Street	Songwriting, lead vocals, guitar, production	
Hey There Golden Hair	2011	Robbers on High Street	Songwriting, lead vocals, production	
Abdication…For Your Love	2011	Reigning Sound	Bass	
Anything Could Happen	2012	Robbers on High Street	Songwriting, lead vocals, production	
Boy Morgan	2012	Boy Morgan	Drums	
"Night Was Stealing From the Sun" / "Days Undone"	2013	The Jay Vons	Bass, vocals	
Shattered	2014	Reigning Sound	Bass	
"It Was Wrong to Love You" / "Ghoulin’"	2015	The Jay Vons	Bass, vocals	
"Want You Tomorrow"	2017	The Jay Vons	Bass, vocals	
"Too Far Gone" / "Turn Back You Fool"	2018	Benny Trokan	Songwriting, lead vocals, twelve-string guitar	
The Word	2019	Reigning Sound	Bass, engineering	
"Get It In the End" / "You Don’t Get Me Down"	2021	Benny Trokan	Songwriting, lead vocals, guitar	
Hey Lovers	2022	Benny Trokan	Lead vocals, twelve-string guitar	
Sentimental Fool	2022	Lee Fields	Bass	
Lucifer on the Sofa	2022	Spoon	Bass	
Do You Still Think of Me	2024	Benny Trokan	Songwriting, lead vocals, guitars, keyboards, percussion, production	
Chateau Blues	2025	Spoon	Bass, songwriting	
