= Ramon Bloomberg =

British artist and film director

Ramon Bloomberg (born 1972 in Sheffield, England) is a writer and film maker based in London.

== Filmography ==
- 2014 – T's World: The Over-identification of Terry Thompson, 30 min, color, HD

- 2013 – Glacis, 30 min, color, HD
- 2011 – Trans Vector, 15 min, color HD
- 2010 – Chinese Shadows, 15 min, color, 35mm

French language, Funded by France 2 TV and CNC France. Aix en Provence film fest 2008, Cleremont Ferrand 2009 Distribution, France 2, 2009

- 2008 – Green Spirit, 3 min, color, HD
- 2006 – Horse Territory, 5 min. Color 35mm

Saatchi and Saatchi New Director's showcase, Cannes 2007, Clermont Ferrand 2007, AFI film festival 2008.

- 2000 – Area K, Documentary, 52 min. Color DV

Brooklyn International Film Festival 2003 : Best Film San Francisco International Film Festival 2003 : Certificate of merit BBC World 2003, Sky TV 2003
