= The Coast Is Always Changing =

Single by Maxïmo Park

from the album A Certain Trigger
- B-side: "The Night I Lost My Head"
- Released: 22 November 2004
- Recorded: Autumn 2004
- Studio: 2khz Studios (London)
- Genre: Post-punk revival
- Length: 3:19
- Label: Warp
- Songwriter: Duncan Lloyd (Music) Paul Smith (Lyrics)
- Producer: Paul Epworth

Maxïmo Park singles chronology
"The Coast Is Always Changing" (2004)	"Apply Some Pressure" (2005)

Music video
- "The Coast Is Always Changing" on YouTube

"The Coast Is Always Changing" is the debut single by English rock band Maxïmo Park and features on their debut album A Certain Trigger. It bubbled under number 121 in the UK charts in 2004. The single was recorded at 2kHz Studios in London.

The music video for the single, directed by Mat Fleming, Christo Wallers and Clive Tonge, was filmed in a small pub in Newcastle upon Tyne called The Head of Steam at a gig they played there in September 2004. They played a special intimate show in the same small venue (90 capacity) in January 2007.

== Track listing ==
- CD WAP 183 CD, 7" 7WAP 183
1. "The Coast Is Always Changing" – 3:19
2. "The Night I Lost My Head" – 1:51
