= Stranger than Fiction (soundtrack) =

Soundtrack album by various artists
- Released: November 7, 2006
- Genres: Indie rock pop
- Label: Columbia/Sony

Stranger than Fiction is the soundtrack to the 2006 fantasy comedy-drama film Stranger than Fiction, directed by Marc Forster and written by Zach Helm.

== Composition ==
Professional ratings
Review scores
Source	Rating
Allmusic	4/5 stars

The music for this soundtrack includes original scores arranged by the collaborative effort of Brian Reitzell (Redd Kross, soundtracks for Marie Antoinette, Lost in Translation, The Virgin Suicides, and Thumbsucker) and Britt Daniel (singer/songwriter of Spoon), as well as an eclectic mix of indie rock songs from various artists including Spoon. In the film, nearly all of the Spoon songs heard are instrumental versions; however, in the actual soundtrack, they include the vocals as well.

When asked about the collaboration, Reitzell commented:

“When I was approached to do the music for Stranger than Fiction, I thought it might be the perfect occasion for Britt Daniel and I to collaborate...I was basically scoring the film with Spoon songs - it created a kind of sonic thread that had just the right amount of nervy melody and rich, simplistic tone I thought suited Zach's story and Marc's vision of the film. The actual ‘job’ of scoring that Britt and I were so excited about doing together became a much easier task since the existing and newly remixed music worked so well. For this soundtrack album, it seemed appropriate to include the full vocal versions of the songs so you can hear them in all their glory as the band originally intended."

== Track listing ==
1. "The Book I Write" - Spoon – 2:13
2. "Going Missing" - Maxïmo Park – 3:41
3. "Whole Wide World" - Wreckless Eric – 2:59
4. "Flours" - Britt Daniel/Brian Reitzell – 1:05
5. "The Way We Get By" - Spoon – 2:41
6. "Mind Your Own Business" - Delta 5 – 3:10
7. "Bottles and Bones (Shade and Sympathy)" - Califone – 5:32
8. "Writer's Block" - Britt Daniel/Brian Reitzell – 2:22
9. "My Mathematical Mind" - Spoon – 5:01
10. "La Petite Fille De La Mer" - Vangelis – 5:52
11. "That's Entertainment (Demo Version)" - The Jam – 3:13
12. "Dubbing in the Back Seat" - The Upsetters – 3:18
13. "Auditor" - Britt Daniel/Brian Reitzell – 1:52
14. "Vittorio E" - Spoon – 3:14
15. "In Church (Cyann and Ben Remix)" - M83 – 6:56

Even though the song "Love You" by The Free Design is featured in the end credits of the movie, it is not on the soundtrack. The song "I Turn My Camera On" by Spoon is also played in the movie, while Harold Crick (Will Ferrell) is in the guitar store. The Ray Davies song "Stop Your Sobbing," as covered by The Pretenders, is featured in the trailer. The movie credits list 22 songs, however the soundtrack only contains fifteen of these songs. The film's score also features two tracks by Max Richter titled "Horizon Variations" and "On the Nature of Daylight," the latter of which is played during the scene when Harold learns of his death.
