= Lucifer on the Moon =

Remix album by Spoon vs On-U Sound
- Released: November 4, 2022
- Studio: On-U SoundCastle (Ramsgate)
- Genre: Dub
- Length: 35:38
- Label: Matador
- Producer: Adrian Sherwood; Spoon

Spoon chronology
Lucifer on the Sofa (2022)	Lucifer on the Moon (2022)	Memory Dust (2023)

Singles from Lucifer on the Moon
- 1. "On the Radio" Released: September 21, 2022; 2. "The Devil & Mister Jones" Released: November 2, 2022

Lucifer on the Moon is a dub remix album of songs from Lucifer on the Sofa, the tenth studio album by American indie rock band Spoon. It is a track-by-track reworking, with all remixes by British dub producer Adrian Sherwood. It was announced on September 21, 2022, and released by Matador Records on November 4, 2022. Sherwood was given access to the entire album's original multi-tracks tapes. Sherwood and his On-U Sound colleagues provided additional instrumentation. Contributors include bassist Doug Wimbish and drummer Keith LeBlanc. It is Spoon's first remix album. They previously released a remix EP for the song "Wild" in May 2022, featuring contributions from Jack Antonoff and Dennis Bovell.

== Critical reception ==
Professional ratings
Review scores
Source	Rating
AllMusic	4/5 stars
Mojo	4/5 stars
Pitchfork	6.3/10

Heather Phares of AllMusic wrote, "More than anything, Lucifer on the Moon emphasizes just how much mileage is in Lucifer on the Sofa's songs. The albums are brothers, but not twins; where Sofa found Spoon embracing the rock traditions underlying their music, Moon celebrates their adventurous spirit. Like many experiments, it's a little uneven, but its risks pay off more often than not." John Bungey Mojo felt Sherwood's remixes of "On the Radio" and "Astral Jacket" were his best. Tal Rosenberg of Pitchfork wrote, "Moon also showcases an unlikely collaboration that pushes both sides in new directions. But in trying to break new creative ground, these inventive musicians end up sounding stuck somewhere in the middle."

== Track listing ==
All tracks are billed as an "Adrian Sherwood Reconstruction".

Lucifer on the Moon track listing
No.	Title	Writer(s)	Length
1.	"My Babe"	Daniel	3:43
2.	"On the Radio"	Daniel	3:35
3.	"Held"	Bill Callahan	4:34
4.	"The Devil & Mister Jones"	Andrew Cashen; Daniel	3:58
5.	"Lucifer on the Sofa"	Daniel; Fischel	4:36
6.	"Astral Jacket"	Daniel	3:42
7.	"Feels Alright"	Daniel; Fischel	2:21
8.	"Wild"	Jack Antonoff; Daniel	3:23
9.	"The Hardest Cut"	Britt Daniel; Alex Fischel	2:02
10.	"Satellite"	Daniel	3:44
Total length:			35:38

== Personnel ==
Moon musicians

- Paul Booth – saxophone
- Alan Glenn – mouth organ
- Ivan 'Celloman' Hussey – cello, keys
- Keith LeBlanc – drums
- Pete Lockett – percussion
- Prisoner – drums
- Doug Wimbish – bass guitar

Sofa musicians

- Britt Daniel
- Jim Eno
- Alex Fischel
- Gerardo Larios
- Benny Trokan
- Steve Berlin
- Jennifer Marigliano
- Caroline Rose
- Ted Tafaro

Technical personnel

- Matthew Smyth – engineering, programming
- Chris Longwood – mastering

Other personnel

- Edel Rodriguez – illustrations
- Matt de Jong – design
- Jamie-James Medina – design

== See also ==
- Echo Dek
- Have Fun with God
