= Going Missing =

Single by Maxïmo Park

from the album A Certain Trigger
- B-side: "A19"
- Released: 18 July 2005
- Recorded: Autumn 2004
- Genre: Post-punk revival
- Length: 3:43
- Label: Warp
- Songwriters: Duncan Lloyd (Music & Lyrics), Paul Smith (Lyrics)
- Producer: Paul Epworth

Maxïmo Park singles chronology
"Graffiti" (2005)	"Going Missing" (2005)	"Apply Some Pressure" (2005)

Music video
- "Going Missing" on YouTube

"Going Missing" is the fourth single released by English rock band Maxïmo Park, taken from their debut album A Certain Trigger. It was released on 18 July 2005 and reached number 20 on the UK Singles Chart. The song was featured during the end credits of the 2006 film Stranger than Fiction, and also appears on its soundtrack. A music video for the song premiered on 3 June 2005, prior to its release as a single, and was directed by Chris Cairns (not to be confused with the New Zealand cricketer or the Australian sailor).

== Track listing ==
- CD1 (WAP190CD)(White Cover) :
1. "Going Missing" – 3:43
2. "A19" – 2:18
- CD2 (WAP190CDR)(Blue Cover) :
1. "Going Missing" (Acoustic) – 3:58
2. "A Year of Doubt" – 2:01
3. "Kiss You Better" (Acoustic) – 2:04
- 7" (7WAP190, one-sided etched vinyl):
1. "Going Missing" – 3:43
2. "Going Missing" (Acoustic) – 3:58
