= Any Given Sundance =

- The Simpsons episode
- Episode no.: Season 19; Episode 18
- Directed by: Chuck Sheetz
- Written by: Daniel Chun
- Production code: KABF11
- Original air date: May 4, 2008

Guest appearances
- Jim Jarmusch as himself; John C. Reilly as himself

Episode features
- Couch gag: The family is a pop-up in a picture book.
- Commentary: Matt Groening; Al Jean; Matt Selman; Mike Scully; Tom Gammill; Max Pross; David Silverman

Episode chronology
← Previous "Apocalypse Cow"	Next → "Mona Leaves-a"
- The Simpsons season 19

"Any Given Sundance" (a play on the title of the film Any Given Sunday, but otherwise unrelated) is the eighteenth episode of the nineteenth season of the American animated television series The Simpsons. It originally aired on the Fox network in the United States on May 4, 2008. The episode was directed by Chuck Sheetz and written by Daniel Chun. It guest-starred Jim Jarmusch and John C. Reilly as themselves. After Lisa enters a film about her family into the Sundance Film Festival, Homer, Marge, Bart, and Maggie are appalled by the candid behind-the scenes look at their family. Meanwhile, Principal Skinner and Superintendent Chalmers decide to enter the movie business.

== Plot ==
The Simpson family heads to a tailgate party, and while Homer and Bart steal other tailgaters' food, Lisa busies herself by filming the events for a school project, and notices life in its own perspective. Lisa shows the film to her teacher, who reviews her film and says he enjoys it, but gives it a 3 out of 5. When she complains to Principal Skinner, who has a secret cinema passion, he tells her a good film should have plenty of drama. Lisa concludes that the only true source of drama is her family, which Skinner understands, knowing Bart. With Skinner granting her access to the school's A/V equipment, Lisa begins to film her family doing their everyday activities.

Superintendent Chalmers takes notice of Lisa's filmmaking and convinces Skinner to enter Lisa's film in the Sundance Film Festival. The Sundance organizers agree to premiere Lisa's film, as she is an intellectual misfit, and her movie is not a mainstream production. Lisa's movie, Capturing the Simpsons (a play on the title of the Sundance documentary Capturing the Friedmans) is accepted. When the family learns Lisa's film had been accepted, they all go to Park City, Utah, anxious to see the premiere of the film. Capturing the Simpsons, produced by "Chalmskinn Productions" begins. Lisa shows her family in all of its dysfunction. Audience members begin making sour remarks about her family. One scene features Bart breaking dishes and Homer walking in with bare feet. Marge cleans up after them and Lisa wishes her a "Happy Birthday," embarrassing the entire family. The film ends, and receives a standing ovation. Homer, Marge, Bart and Maggie are all appalled at how Lisa portrayed them in the film.

Comic Book Guy posts a glowing review of the film on his blog, which attracts worldwide attention and leads to some film distributors negotiating with Skinner and Chalmers to buy Lisa's movie. Meanwhile, Lisa's family realize others hate them because of the way they were portrayed in the film (with one person of the original audience going as far as to swear Maggie's death), and approach the family and ask them to act the way they did in the film. Lisa feels sorry for what she did to the family, and while deep in thought, Jim Jarmusch approaches her and says he can relate because his movies are also about "social misfits experiencing the dark side of the American dream". Lisa however, feels that she may have subconsciously humiliated her family on purpose. He tells her the answer to her question of whether or not her family will forgive her can be found in a film: Life Blows Chunks, a documentary by Nelson Muntz which had been in production by Chalmskinn Productions at the same time as Lisa's film. It shows Nelson's struggling life, where Mrs. Muntz is a thief and drinks heavily. When his film ends, Lisa learns that although her family may embarrass her or infuriate her, there are other families with tougher problems. She apologizes to her family, and they gratefully forgive her. Nelson and Mrs. Muntz, who are now in the spotlight, enjoy the attention.

During the tag scene, Skinner and Chalmers meet John C. Reilly, who unsuccessfully tries to audition for Chalmskinn's next movie, Ghost Willie.

== Reception ==
Robert Canning of IGN gave the episode a 6.8 out of 10. He liked the joke but thought the episode "told a less than engaging story."

Richard Keller of TV Squad called "Any Given Sundance" a "so-so episode" and said "it just had the feeling of one of those installments where you look up and the show is over. And, the bad thing is you really don't remember what happened". His favorite part of the episode was Nelson's documentary which he compared to that of Barney Gumble in "A Star Is Burns".

"Any Given Sundance" was watched by 6.18 million people during its first airing on May 4, 2008.

In 2012, Matt Zoller Seitz considered the episode one of the many "flashes of greatness" in The Simpsons' later years after 2000, stating that "Season nineteen's 'Any Given Sundance'... should be required viewing in film schools."
