= Graffiti (Maxïmo Park song) =

2005 single by Maxïmo Park

Single by Maxïmo Park

from the album A Certain Trigger
- B-side: "Trial and Error"
- Released: 2 May 2005
- Recorded: Autumn 2004
- Length: 3:05
- Label: Warp
- Songwriters: Duncan Lloyd; Paul Smith
- Producer: Paul Epworth

Maxïmo Park singles chronology
"Apply Some Pressure" (2005)	"Graffiti" (2005)	"Going Missing" (2005)

Music video
- "Graffiti" on YouTube

"Graffiti" is the third single released by English rock band Maxïmo Park, taken from their debut album A Certain Trigger. It was released on 2 May 2005, and reached number 15 on the UK Singles Chart. The song was awarded 'Lyric of the year' on BBC 6 Music for lyrics written by guitarist Duncan Lloyd. A music video was released for the song ahead of its release as a single, which premiered on 18 March 2005, depicts the band performing the song in a room between three lamps, and was directed by Lynn Fox.

== Track listing ==
- CD1 (WAP187CD) (White Background) :
1. "Graffiti" – 3:05
2. "Trial and Error" – 2:29
- CD2 (WAP187CDR) (Green Background) :
1. "Graffiti" (Original Demo Version) – 3:11
2. "Stray Talk" – 2:47
3. "Apply Some Pressure" (Original Demo Version) – 3:27
- 7" (7WAP187, white vinyl):
1. "Graffiti" – 3:05
2. "Hammer Horror" – 3:31

== Charts ==
Chart (2005)	Peak position
UK Indie (OCC)	2
UK Singles (OCC)	15
