= Apply Some Pressure =

Single by Maxïmo Park

from the album A Certain Trigger
- B-side: "Fear of Falling"; "The Coast Is Always Changing"; "I Want You to Leave"; "Once, a Glimpse"; "My Life in Reverse"; "Isolation"
- Released: 21 February 2005
- Recorded: Autumn 2004
- Genre: Indie rock; post-punk revival; new wave; power pop
- Length: 3:20 (album version); 2:45 (radio edit)
- Label: Warp
- Songwriters: Duncan Lloyd; Paul Smith
- Producer: Paul Epworth

Maxïmo Park singles chronology
"The Coast Is Always Changing" (2004)	"Apply Some Pressure" (2005)	"Graffiti" (2005)
"Going Missing" (2005)	"Apply Some Pressure" (2005)	"I Want You to Stay" (2006)

Audio sample
- file; help

Music videos
- "Apply Some Pressure" (Version 1) on YouTube; "Apply Some Pressure" (Version 2) on YouTube

"Apply Some Pressure" is a song by the English indie rock band Maxïmo Park. It was released as the second single from their debut studio album, A Certain Trigger (2005), on 21 February 2005. The song was re-released in October 2005. The music was written by Duncan Lloyd and the lyrics by Paul Smith.

The song originally reached number 20 on the UK Singles Chart in February 2005 and later number 17 after its re-release. It was listed as the 352nd best song of the 2000s by Pitchfork. The song has been used in several video games such as SSX on Tour, Burnout Revenge, SingStar Rocks! and the PlayStation Portable version of Asphalt: Urban GT 2.

== Music videos ==
Two music videos were released for "Apply Some Pressure", one for its initial February 2005 release and one for its October 2005 reissue. The first, directed by Canadian independent filmmaker Jaron Albertin, depicts the band performing the song behind a wall of people intercut with footage of various visual effects. The second, directed by the British directing duo Diamond Dogs, depicts the band performing at a Magic show-like event, intercut with footage of frontman Paul Smith performing in moving bureau drawers, Wardrobe closets, and a box that's about to be sewed in half by a magician, and later getting a Nosebleed, performing with his blindfolded bandmates.

== Track listings ==
=== 21 February 2005 release ===
- CD (WAP185CD):
1. "Apply Some Pressure" (Radio Edit) – 2:45
2. "Fear of Falling" – 2:36
- Maxi-CD (WAP185CDX):
1. "Apply Some Pressure" – 3:20
2. "The Coast Is Always Changing" – 3:19
3. "Fear of Falling" – 2:36
4. "I Want You to Leave" – 2:18
- 7" (7WAP185):
1. "Apply Some Pressure" – 3:20
2. "I Want You to Leave" – 2:18
- 10" (10WAP185X):
1. "Apply Some Pressure" – 3:20
2. "The Coast Is Always Changing" – 3:19
3. "Fear of Falling" – 2:36
4. "I Want You to Leave" – 2:18

=== 31 October 2005 re-release ===
- CD (WAP198CD):
1. "Apply Some Pressure" – 3:20
2. "My Life in Reverse" – 3:20
3. "Once, a Glimpse" (Original Demo Version) – 3:27
- 7" #1 (7WAP198, orange vinyl):
1. "Apply Some Pressure" – 3:20
2. "My Life in Reverse" – 3:20
- 7" #2 (7WAP198R, clear vinyl):
1. "Apply Some Pressure" (Live in Japan) – 3:22
2. "Isolation" (John Lennon cover) – 1:14

== Mark Ronson cover ==
The song was re-worked by Mark Ronson for his album Version. The cover version features the Maxïmo Park singer Paul Smith on guest vocals. Smith recorded the vocals for Ronson after Ronson invited him to perform on the instrumental he had made based on the band's original.

== Charts ==
Chart (2005)	Peak position
Scotland Singles (OCC)	15
UK Indie (OCC)	2
UK Singles (OCC)	17
