= Spoon (band) =

American rock band

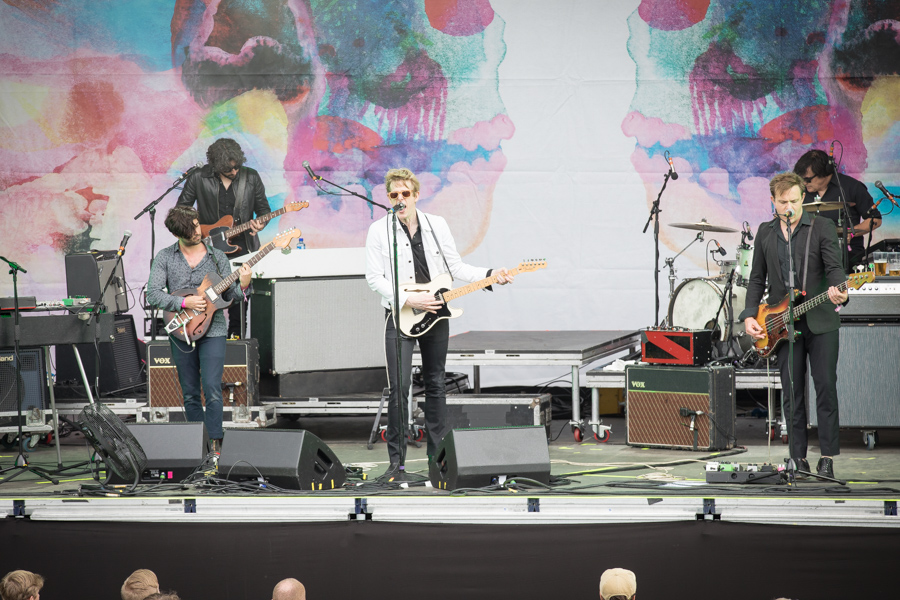
- Spoon performing live in 2017

Background information
- Origin: Austin, Texas, U.S.
- Genres: Indie rock; art rock; post-punk revival
- Works: Spoon discography
- Years active: 1993–present
- Labels: Matador; Merge; Loma Vista; ANTI-; Elektra; Peek-A-Boo
- Members: Britt Daniel; Jim Eno; Alex Fischel; Ben Trokan; Jason Roberts
- Past members: Roman Kuebler; Bradley Shenfeld; Joshua Zarbo; Andy Maguire; Greg Wilson; Sean Kirkpatrick; Scott Adair; Hunter Darby; Eric Harvey; Rob Pope; Gerardo Larios
- Website: spoontheband.com

Spoon is an American rock band from Austin, Texas, consisting of members Britt Daniel (vocals, guitar), Jim Eno (drums), Alex Fischel (keyboards, guitar), and Ben Trokan (bass, keyboards). The band was formed in Austin in October 1993 by Daniel and Eno. Critics have described the band's musical style as rock and roll, post-punk, and art rock.

Spoon released their debut studio album, Telephono, in 1996 through Matador Records. Their next full-length album, A Series of Sneaks, was released in 1998 through Elektra Records. The band subsequently signed with Merge Records, where Spoon achieved greater commercial and critical prominence with the albums Girls Can Tell (2001), Kill the Moonlight (2002), Gimme Fiction (2005), Ga Ga Ga Ga Ga (2007), and Transference (2010). They signed with Loma Vista Recordings and ANTI- for the release of They Want My Soul (2014). The band later returned to Matador to release their ninth and tenth albums, Hot Thoughts (2017) and Lucifer on the Sofa (2022).

== History ==
=== 1993–1997: Early years ===
The band was formed in late 1993 by lead singer and guitarist Britt Daniel and drummer Jim Eno, after the two met as members of the Alien Beats. The name Spoon was chosen to honor the 1970s German krautrock band Can, whose hit song "Spoon" was the theme song to the 1985 movie Jagged Edge in the United States.

Spoon's first recording was the EP Nefarious, released on vinyl in May 1994. In 1995, the band signed with Matador Records, and Spoon released its first full-length LP Telephono in 1996. The album was met with mixed reviews, with critics comparing their sound to Pavement, Pixies and Wire. But comparisons aside, Telephono showed signs of a band slipping free of its influences, mixing post-punk with a blend of pop.

Less than a year later, Spoon released its second EP, Soft Effects, which served as a transition to their more distinctive, honed sound. Unlike its predecessors, Soft Effects was less noisy and brash, showcasing a more sophisticated, minimalist approach.

In late 1996, Spoon was playing a gig at the Argo in Denton, Texas, with Ed Cooper and local band Maxine's Radiator, which featured Joshua Zarbo on bass. Zarbo was invited to audition for Daniel and Eno in 1997, and subsequently became the band's full-time bassist until his permanent departure in 2006.

=== 1998–1999: Major label debut ===
After the release of Soft Effects, Spoon signed to Elektra Records and released A Series of Sneaks in May 1998. The album did not sell as well as the label had hoped; merely four months after the release of Sneaks, Spoon's Elektra A&R contact Ron Laffitte quit his job and that week the band was dropped from the label. Angry with Laffitte, who had promised to stick with the band, Spoon recorded a vindictive yet humorously titled two-song concept single entitled "The Agony of Laffitte", which was released by Saddle Creek Records. They lamented their experience with the music business executive and questioned his motivations with the songs "The Agony of Laffitte" and "Laffitte Don't Fail Me Now".

=== 2000–2006: Signing with Merge Records ===
Spoon signed with Merge Records and released the Love Ways EP in 2000. The decision was made to do this without bassist Joshua Zarbo, who had briefly left the band. In 2001, Spoon released its third LP entitled Girls Can Tell. The new record was a success, selling more copies than both of their previous LP releases combined. The band's next release in 2002, Kill the Moonlight had similar success. That album's single "The Way We Get By" was popularized by its placement in the movie Stranger than Fiction (released later, in 2006), in an episode of the teen drama The O.C., and on the first episode of the American version of the series Shameless. Their next album, Gimme Fiction, was released in May 2005, and debuted at number 44 on the Billboard 200, selling more than 160,000 copies.

Daniel collaborated with Brian Reitzell to compose and arrange the soundtrack for the 2006 film Stranger than Fiction. The soundtrack consists chiefly of music performed by Spoon, and according to the liner notes of the official soundtrack, Reitzell collaborated with Britt Daniel to compose the score, while also adapting several tracks from Kill the Moonlight and Gimme Fiction into instrumental versions of the songs.

=== 2007–2012: Ga Ga Ga Ga Ga and Transference ===
On July 10, 2007, Ga Ga Ga Ga Ga was released and debuted at number 10 on the Billboard 200. Since the release of Kill the Moonlight in 2002, Spoon has performed on the late night talk shows Late Show with David Letterman, Late Night with Conan O'Brien, The Late Late Show with Craig Ferguson, Last Call with Carson Daly, and The Tonight Show with Conan O'Brien, as well as the PBS show Austin City Limits. They were also musical guests on Saturday Night Live on October 6, 2007, where they performed "The Underdog" and "You Got Yr. Cherry Bomb".

In 2009, the review aggregator Metacritic ranked Spoon as its "Top overall artist of the decade", based on the band's consistently high review scores between 2000 and 2009, among other factors. On January 18, 2010, the band released its seventh studio album, Transference. It debuted at No. 4 on the Billboard 200, selling 53,000 copies in its first week. Their song "The Mystery Zone" was also chosen as the Starbucks iTunes Pick of the Week on January 26, 2010. Later that year, Spoon recorded the title track on the album See My Friends in collaboration with Ray Davies.

On April 12, 2010, Spoon made a guest appearance on Conan O'Brien's The Legally Prohibited from Being Funny on Television Tour in Eugene, Oregon, where they performed the song "I Summon You" from their album Gimme Fiction.

=== 2013–2016: They Want My Soul ===
Spoon released their eighth LP, They Want My Soul, on August 5, 2014. It was their first record released by Loma Vista Recordings, after five records on Merge. It was recorded with Joe Chiccarelli and Dave Fridmann. That year they took part in the Hamilton, Ontario Supercrawl. Reviewing for Pitchfork, Ryan Dombal gave the album a rating of 8.6/10, writing: "They Want My Soul is the quintet's most booming LP, eons ahead of their Pixies-worshipping beginnings and a far cry from the relatively small-scale charm of their early-2000s touchstones Girls Can Tell and Kill the Moonlight, as well as their self-consciously lo-fi 2010 record, Transference." The album was also ranked as 13th of 50 in Pitchfork's Best New Music of 2014.

On October 30, 2014, Spoon appeared as the featured musical guests during The Daily Show's Democalypse 2014: South By South Mess.

=== 2017–2019: Hot Thoughts and Everything Hits at Once ===
On March 17, 2017, Spoon released their ninth studio album Hot Thoughts on Matador Records, their first on the label since their 1996 debut (Matador had handled the European release of Gimme Fiction in 2005.)

In April 2019, the band made the news via Democratic presidential candidate Pete Buttigieg, who was filmed playing the band's song "The Way We Get By" on piano before an event by his spokesperson, Lis Smith. The band responded by sharing the video on their Facebook and Twitter pages, remarking: "So this guy can just do anyone's job, huh."

In June 2019, the band announced the release of their greatest hits album, Everything Hits at Once: The Best of Spoon. The album compiles the band's most well-known songs, as well as a new single entitled "No Bullets Spent". The album was released on July 26 via Matador. On July 9, Rob Pope announced he would be leaving the band. On August 29, 2020, for Record Store Day, the band released All the Weird Kids Up Front (Más Rolas Chidas), a fan-selected companion piece to their best of, with a tracklist submitted and voted on by fans.

=== 2021–present: Lucifer on the Sofa ===
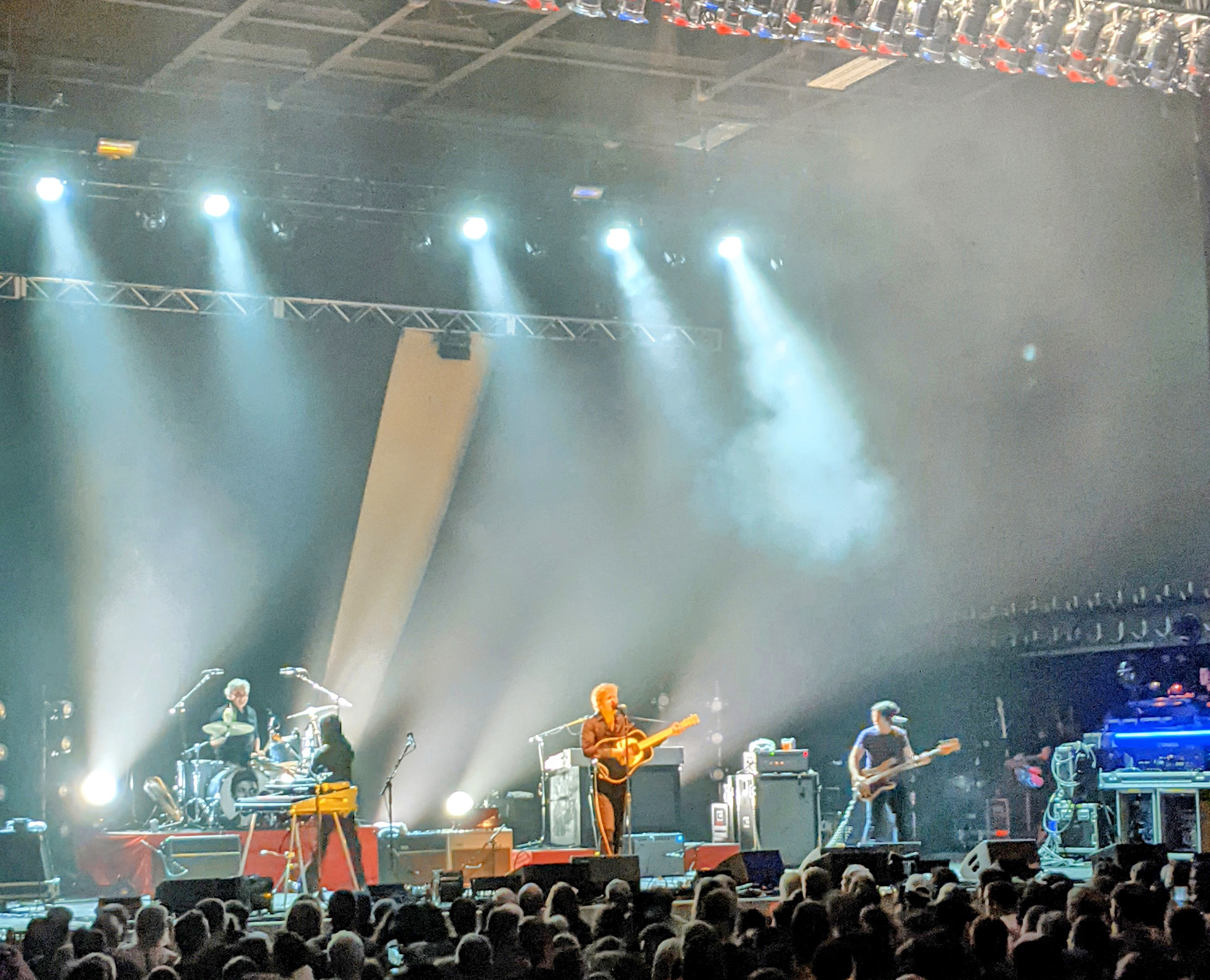
Spoon performing in Pittsburgh, Pennsylvania, in 2022, as part of their tour of Lucifer on the Sofa album

Spoon began recording their tenth studio album in late 2018 at drummer Jim Eno's studio with producers Mark Rankin and Justin Raisen. It was nearly finished as of early 2020, but was put on hold due to the COVID-19 pandemic, with the new release date tentatively set for early 2021. On March 12, 2021, Spoon released covers of two Tom Petty songs, "Breakdown" and "A Face in the Crowd". On October 28, 2021, the band announced their tenth studio album, Lucifer on the Sofa with lead single "The Hardest Cut" being released on the same day. The second single from Lucifer on the Sofa, "Wild", was released as a 7-inch single on December 10, 2021. The song was backed with a remix by Dennis Bovell on the B-side. The album was released on February 11, 2022, via Matador.

On September 21, 2022, Spoon announced Lucifer on the Moon, a track-by-track reworking of Lucifer on the Sofa, with all remixes by Adrian Sherwood. The album was released on November 4, 2022.

In November 2022, the album was nominated for Best Rock Album at the 65th Annual Grammy Awards, which marked the band's first Grammys nomination.

In May 2023, Spoon announced the Memory Dust EP. In mid-2023, they opened several shows for Weezer during their Indie Rock Road Trip tour.

In August 2025, Spoon announced two new singles "Chateau Blues" and "Guess I'm Fallin In Love". The single will be included on their in-progress eleventh studio album. The band also announced a tour with Pixies.

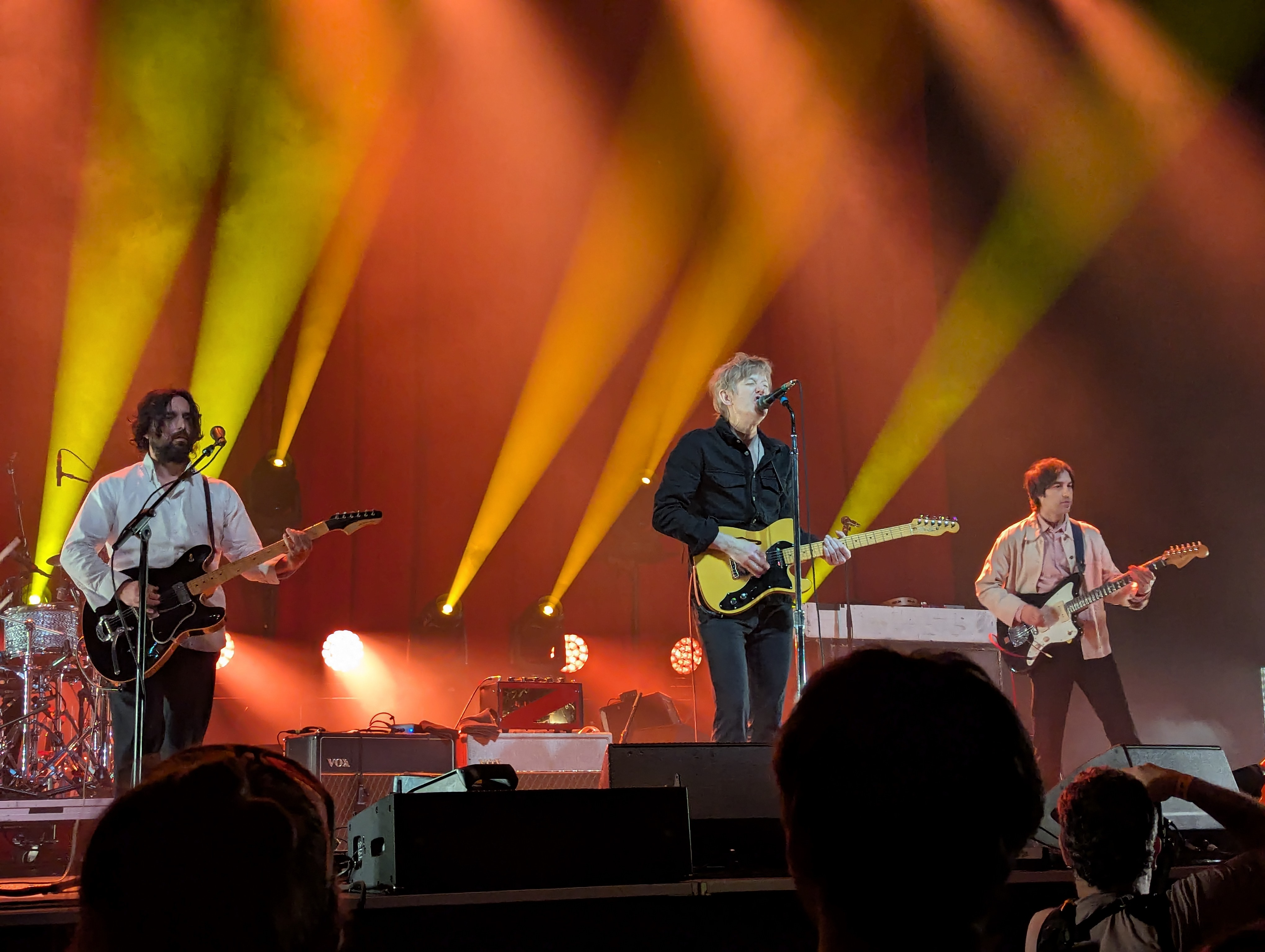
Spoon performing in Newport, Kentucky, in June 2026

In June 2026, Spoon co-headlined a 10-day U.S. tour with The Beths.

== Band members ==
Current members

- Britt Daniel – lead vocals, guitar, bass, keyboards, percussion (1993–present)
- Jim Eno – drums, percussion, programming (1993–present)
- Alex Fischel – keyboards, guitar, backing vocals (2013–present)
- Ben Trokan – bass, keyboards (2021–present; touring member 2019–2021)
- Jason Roberts - guitar, keyboards, percussion, backing vocals (touring member 2025-present)

Former members

- Greg Wilson (aka Wendel Stivers) – guitar (1993–1994)
- Andy Maguire – bass, backing vocals (1993–1996)
- John Croslin – bass (1996)
- Hunter Darby – bass (1996)
- Scott "Clanky" Adair – bass (1996–1997)
- Joshua Zarbo – bass (1997–2006)
- Eric Friend – keyboards (2000–2004)
- Roman Keubler – bass (2000–2002)
- Eric Harvey – guitar, keyboards, percussion, backing vocals (2004–2017)
- Rob Pope – bass, guitar, keyboards, backing vocals (2006–2019)
- Gerardo Larios – guitar, keyboards, backing vocals (2019–2024; touring member 2017–2019)

== Discography ==
Studio albums

- Telephono (1996)
- A Series of Sneaks (1998)
- Girls Can Tell (2001)
- Kill the Moonlight (2002)
- Gimme Fiction (2005)
- Ga Ga Ga Ga Ga (2007)
- Transference (2010)
- They Want My Soul (2014)
- Hot Thoughts (2017)
- Lucifer on the Sofa (2022)
