= Hot Thoughts =

Studio album by Spoon
- Released: March 17, 2017
- Recorded: December 2015 – July 2016
- Studios: Tarbox Road (Cassadaga, New York); Public Hi-Fi (Austin, Texas); The Catacomb (Los Angeles, California)
- Genres: Indie rock; alternative dance; dance-punk; art pop
- Length: 41:52
- Label: Matador
- Producers: Dave Fridmann; Spoon

Spoon chronology
They Want My Soul (2014)	Hot Thoughts (2017)	Everything Hits at Once (2019)

Singles from Hot Thoughts
- 1. "Hot Thoughts" Released: January 17, 2017; 2. "Can I Sit Next to You" Released: February 21, 2017; 3. "Do I Have to Talk You Into It" Released: October 23, 2017

Hot Thoughts is the ninth studio album by American rock band Spoon. It was released on March 17, 2017, through Matador Records. It is also the first Spoon album since 2002's Kill the Moonlight to not feature multi-instrumentalist Eric Harvey, who quietly left the band after finishing a world tour in support of 2014's They Want My Soul.

== Reception ==
Professional ratings
Aggregate scores
Source	Rating
AnyDecentMusic?	7.7/10
Metacritic	82/100
Review scores
Source	Rating
AllMusic	4/5 stars
Chicago Tribune	3.5/4 stars
Entertainment Weekly	A−
The Guardian	5/5 stars
NME	3/5 stars
Pitchfork	7.4/10
Q	4/5 stars
Rolling Stone	4/5 stars
The Times	4/5 stars
Uncut	8/10

Hot Thoughts received acclaim from music critics. At Metacritic, which assigns a normalized rating out of 100 to reviews from mainstream critics, the album received an average score of 82, based on 30 reviews, indicating "universal acclaim".

Jillian Mapes of Pitchfork wrote "Spoon stay in their well-earned lane but tweak the formula just enough on their ninth album, keeping their reliably great songwriting and adding new, electronic textures."

== Accolades ==
Publication	Accolade	Rank	Ref.
ABC News	Top 50 Albums of 2017	3	
Consequence of Sound	Top 50 Albums of 2017	9	
Diffuser.fm	Top 25 Albums of 2017	4	
Double J	Top 50 Albums of 2017	14	
Flood Magazine	Top 25 Albums of 2017	6	
The Ringer	Top 10 Albums of 2017	4	
Spectrum Culture	Top 20 Albums of 2017	11	
Time Out	Top 29 Albums of 2017	14	
Under the Radar	Top 100 Albums of 2017	13	

== Track listing ==
No.	Title	Writer(s)	Length
1.	"Hot Thoughts"	Britt Daniel, Sean Dineen	3:50
2.	"WhisperI'lllistentohearit"	Daniel	4:20
3.	"Do I Have to Talk You Into It"	Daniel	4:20
4.	"First Caress"	Daniel, Alex Fischel	2:48
5.	"Pink Up"	Daniel	5:56
6.	"Can I Sit Next to You"	Daniel	3:54
7.	"I Ain't the One"	Daniel	3:48
8.	"Tear It Down"	Daniel, Laura Pergolizzi	4:20
9.	"Shotgun"	Daniel, Dineen	3:38
10.	"Us" (instrumental)	Daniel, Ted Taforo	4:56
Total length:			41:52

== Personnel ==
Credits adapted from liner notes for Hot Thoughts

Spoon

- Britt Daniel – vocals, guitars, keys, piano, percussion, bass
- Jim Eno – drums, percussion, keys
- Alex Fischel – keyboards, piano, guitars, percussion
- Rob Pope – bass, percussion

Production

- Spoon – production, recording, mixing
- Dave Fridmann – production, recording, mixing
- Brad Bell – engineering
- Matt Gerhard – engineering
- Mike Fridmann – engineering
- Max Lorenzen – engineering
- Grant Eppley – engineering
- Howie Weinberg – mastering
- Gentry Studer – mastering
- Janet Weiss – song sequencing

Additional musicians

- Sabrina Ellis – vocals (track 8)
- Sara Houser – vocals (tracks 4, 6 and 8)
- Stephen Patterson – extra drums (track 5)
- Blair Robbins – vocals (tracks 4, 6 and 8)
- Brad Shenfeld – darbuka, saz (track 5)
- Ted Taforo – saxophone (track 10)
- Sharon Van Etten – vocals (track 4)

Artwork

- Christine Messersmith – cover image
- Alan Hynes – design
- Britt Daniel – design

== Charts ==
Chart (2017)	Peak position
Australian Albums (ARIA)	21
Austrian Albums (Ö3 Austria)	31
Belgian Albums (Ultratop Flanders)	48
Belgian Albums (Ultratop Wallonia)	194
Canadian Albums (Billboard)	39
Dutch Albums (Album Top 100)	27
French Albums (SNEP)	192
German Albums (Offizielle Top 100)	40
Japanese Albums Chart	171
New Zealand Heatseekers Albums (RMNZ)	8
Portuguese Albums (AFP)	28
Scottish Albums (Official Charts)	62
Spanish Albums (PROMUSICAE)	100
Swiss Albums (Schweizer Hitparade)	33
UK Albums (Official Charts)	76
US Billboard 200	17
US Top Alternative Albums (Billboard)	2
US Independent Albums (Billboard)	2
US Top Rock Albums (Billboard)	2
US Vinyl Albums (Billboard)	1
