= Gimme Fiction =

Studio album by Spoon
- Released: May 10, 2005
- Recorded: July – September 2004
- Studio: Public Hi-Fi (Austin, Texas)
- Genre: Indie rock; art rock; indie pop; post-punk revival
- Length: 43:48
- Label: Merge; Matador
- Producer: Britt Daniel; Jim Eno; Mike McCarthy

Spoon chronology
Kill the Moonlight (2002)	Gimme Fiction (2005)	Ga Ga Ga Ga Ga (2007)

Singles from Gimme Fiction
- 1. "I Turn My Camera On" Released: March 30, 2005; 2. "Sister Jack" Released: October 10, 2005

Gimme Fiction is the fifth studio album by American rock band Spoon. It was released on May 10, 2005, through Merge Records in the US and Matador Records in Europe. It debuted at number 44 on the Billboard 200. "I Turn My Camera On" was released as a single and became one of the band's biggest hits. A deluxe reissue of the album was released on December 11, 2015, to commemorate its 10th anniversary.

== Background ==
Britt Daniel began working on songs for Spoon's follow-up album to Kill the Moonlight in early 2003 when he received a letter from David Klowden in which he offered to let Daniel use his beach house if he wanted to "go on another writing stint". Daniel drove to Ocean Beach in San Diego and started writing songs for the next album in a small house that overlooked the ocean. He stayed there for a number of weeks and recalls working a lot but not feeling happy with the output of his work there.

Before the title Gimme Fiction was decided on, the album was going to be named The Beast and Dragon, Adored after the opening track, but Daniel later decided that he did not like this title. Daniel decided he wanted to use the word "gimme" in the title of the album and thought that "Gimme Fiction" was a great title for the artwork. He also has stated that the album cover is his favorite to date.

The title of the opening track, "The Beast and Dragon, Adored", came from an art magazine which Daniel found at his grandmother's house that contained a tapestry called "The Apocalypse: The Beast and Dragon Are Adored".

== Reception ==
Professional ratings
Aggregate scores
Source	Rating
Metacritic	84/100
Review scores
Source	Rating
AllMusic	4/5 stars
Entertainment Weekly	A−
Houston Chronicle	4/5 stars
Mojo	4/5 stars
Pitchfork	7.9/10
Q	4/5 stars
Rolling Stone	3.5/5 stars
Spin	B−
Uncut	4/5 stars
The Village Voice	B+

Gimme Fiction received widespread critical acclaim upon release. At Metacritic, which assigns a normalized rating out of 100 to reviews from mainstream critics, the album received an average score of 84, based on 30 reviews which indicates "universal acclaim". Eric Carr of Pitchfork praised the album's musical diversity and cited "I Turn My Camera On" as one of the most "breathtaking" songs the band had ever produced. Zeth Lundy of PopMatters named the album the band's "crowning achievement", while Jesus Chigley of Drowned in Sound described it as "a nocturnal, introspective refinement of previous releases that still capitalises on Britt Daniel's classic pop song writing and sonic inventiveness."

In a 2005 back page column for the magazine Entertainment Weekly, author Stephen King named "I Summon You" as his favorite song of the year.

== Legacy ==
In 2009, Rhapsody ranked the album at number 19 on its list of the 100 best albums of the decade. As of December 2009, Gimme Fiction has sold approximately 215,000 copies, according to Nielsen Soundscan. In his oral history of the album titled Gimme Facts, writer Sean O'Neal named the album "a historic forward leap" for the band.

On November 3, 2015, it was announced that a deluxe edition of Gimme Fiction would be released on December 11, 2015, to commemorate the album's 10th anniversary. Joe Goggins of Drowned in Sound, reviewing the re-issue, wrote: "If ever there was a fork in the road for the group, this album was probably it; knowing, as we do with the benefit of hindsight, that they picked the right route, Gimme Fiction sounds even more invigorating on reflection." Barry Walters of Rolling Stone called it a "transitional album that presaged 2007's pop breakthrough Ga Ga Ga Ga Ga." GQ critic Miles Raymer dubbed Gimme Fiction "the most important rock record of the last decade".

== In pop culture ==
- "I Turn My Camera On" was used on the Bones episode "The Man in the S.U.V". It was also used in The Simpsons episode "Any Given Sundance", the Veronica Mars episode "Cheatty Cheatty Bang Bang", and in the season 1 episode "Nevermind" of Friday Night Lights.
- "The Infinite Pet" was used in the 2009 film 500 Days of Summer, although it was left out from the movie's soundtrack.

== Track listing ==
All tracks are written by Britt Daniel.

No.	Title	Length
1.	"The Beast and Dragon, Adored"	4:18
2.	"The Two Sides of Monsieur Valentine (Note: Alternatively written as "Two Sides / Monsieur Valentine" on the back cover.)"	2:58
3.	"I Turn My Camera On"	3:32
4.	"My Mathematical Mind"	5:02
5.	"The Delicate Place"	3:42
6.	"Sister Jack"	3:35
7.	"I Summon You"	3:55
8.	"The Infinite Pet"	3:56
9.	"Was It You?"	5:02
10.	"They Never Got You"	4:59
11.	"Merchants of Soul"	2:49
Total length:		43:48

Bonus tracks
No.	Title	Length
1.	"Carryout Kids"	2:49
2.	"You Was It"	3:59
3.	"I Summon You" (Demo)	3:58
4.	"Sister Jack" (Piano Demo)	1:43
Total length:		12:29

10th Anniversary Deluxe Edition Disc 2: Home Demos
No.	Title	Length
1.	"I Summon You" (First Demo)	3:33
2.	"Was It You?" (Home Demo)	4:21
3.	"I've Been Good Too Long" (Home Demo)	2:51
4.	"Sister Jack" (Piano Demo)	1:40
5.	"The Beast and Dragon, Adored" (Home Demo)	4:00
6.	"My Mathematical Mind" (Home Demo)	1:33
7.	"They Never Got You" (Home Demo)	4:25
8.	"The Two Sides of Monsieur Valentine" (Home Demo)	2:36
9.	"The Delicate Place" (Home Demo)	3:42
10.	"The Infinite Pet" (Home Demo)	3:32
11.	"Merchants of Soul" (Home Demo)	1:55
12.	"Dear Mr. Landlord" (Home Demo)	2:09
Total length:		36:17

10th Anniversary Deluxe Edition: Odds and Ends
No.	Title	Length
1.	"The Beast and Dragon, Adored" (Rehearsal)	3:56
2.	"Sister Jack" (Up Demo)	1:36
3.	"I Turn My Camera On" (First Demo)	1:52
4.	"My Mathematical Mind" (First Rehearsal)	3:45
5.	"The Delicate Place" (Vanderslice + Solter Version)	3:39
6.	"I Wanna Go" (Demo)	1:32
7.	"Tear Me Down" (Demo)	2:08
8.	"I Summon You" (Electric Demo)	4:11
9.	"My Mathematical Mind" (Vanderslice + Solter Version)	4:33
Total length:		27:12

== Personnel ==
Credits adapted from liner notes for Gimme Fiction.

Spoon

- Britt Daniel – vocals (all tracks), guitars (1–7, 9–11), bass guitar (1–3, 5–10), piano (1, 2, 7, 8, 11), sound effects (3, 6, 9), Rhodes (1, 8), keyboards (3, 10), memory man (4), tambourine (7), kalimba (8), organ (8), flute patch (9), sleigh bells (9), Wurlitzer (9), slaps (11), Moog (11), shaker (11)
- Jim Eno – drums (1–9, 11), high hat (10)
- Eric Harvey – piano (4)
- Josh Zarbo – bass guitar (4)

Additional musicians

- Mike McCarthy – snaps (3), string swoops (4), programming (10), flams (10), xylophone (10)
- Ames Asbell – viola (2, 11)
- Sara Nelson – cello (2, 11)
- John Painter – trumpet (4), trombone (4), saxophone (4)
- Eddie Robert – "creepy bass" (9)
- John Vanderslice – rings (9), feedbacks (9)
- Scott Solter – delay drum (9)
- Eric Bachmann – backing vocals (3)

Production

- Britt Daniel – production (all tracks), engineering (8)
- Jim Eno – production (all tracks), engineering (all tracks)
- Mike McCarthy – production (all tracks), engineering (all tracks)
- Scott Solter – additional production (9), engineering (9)
- John Vanderslice – additional production (9)
- Jim Vollentine – engineering (4)
- Greg Calbi – mastering (all tracks)
- Sean McCabe – artwork

== Charts ==
Chart (2005)	Peak position
US Billboard 200	44
US Independent Albums (Billboard)	1
