= Transference (album) =

Studio album by Spoon
- Released: January 15, 2010
- Recorded: 2009
- Studios: Rare Book Room (Brooklyn, New York); The Catacomb (Portland, Oregon); Crystal Ballroom (Portland, Oregon)
- Genres: Indie rock; art rock
- Length: 43:00
- Labels: Merge; ANTI-
- Producers: Britt Daniel; Jim Eno

Spoon chronology
Ga Ga Ga Ga Ga (2007)	Transference (2010)	They Want My Soul (2014)

Singles from Transference
- 1. "Written in Reverse" Released: December 1, 2009

Transference is the seventh studio album by the American indie rock band Spoon. It was released on January 18, 2010, in Europe, and on January 19 in North America. In Australia, it was released by Spunk Records on January 15.

The album debuted at number 4 on the Billboard 200 chart, selling 53,000 copies in its first week. As of June 2013, it had sold 183,000 copies in United States.

The cover image is an untitled 1970 photograph by the American photographer William Eggleston.

== Reception ==
Professional ratings
Aggregate scores
Source	Rating
AnyDecentMusic?	7.2/10
Metacritic	80/100
Review scores
Source	Rating
AllMusic	4/5 stars
The A.V. Club	A−
Entertainment Weekly	A−
The Guardian	4/5 stars
Los Angeles Times	3.5/4 stars
MSN Music (Consumer Guide)	A−
NME	7/10
Pitchfork	7.8/10
Rolling Stone	3.5/5 stars
Spin	7/10

Exclaim! placed Transference at number 9 on their list of the Best Pop & Rock Albums of 2010, with Ben Conoley writing: "With Transference, Spoon took a more minimalist approach than predecessors Ga Ga Ga Ga Ga and Gimme Fiction, demonstrating that great rock music doesn't need more than confidence, swagger and good hooks." Rolling Stone ranked it number 22 on their list of the 30 Best Albums of 2010, and Paste Magazine (No. 36), Spin Magazine (No. 31), The A.V. Club (No. 25), PopMatters (No. 25), and Uncut Magazine (No. 22) also included it on their year-end lists of the best albums of 2010.

== Track listing ==
All tracks are written by Britt Daniel.

No.	Title	Length
1.	"Before Destruction"	3:17
2.	"Is Love Forever?"	2:07
3.	"The Mystery Zone"	4:59
4.	"Who Makes Your Money"	3:44
5.	"Written in Reverse"	4:18
6.	"I Saw the Light"	5:32
7.	"Trouble Comes Running"	3:05
8.	"Goodnight Laura"	2:28
9.	"Out Go the Lights"	4:36
10.	"Got Nuffin"	3:58
11.	"Nobody Gets Me But You"	4:56
Total length:		43:00

European ANTI- edition
No.	Title	Length
12.	"Mean Red Spider"	3:05

Japanese release
No.	Title	Length
12.	"Tweakers"	3:43
13.	"Stroke Their Brains"	3:32

Notes

- "The Mystery Zone" has a track length of 5:50 on the LP edition of the album.

== Personnel ==
Personnel taken from Transference liner notes.

Spoon

- Britt Daniel
- Jim Eno
- Eric Harvey
- Rob Pope

Production

- Britt Daniel – production, recording, artwork, mixing (8)
- Jim Eno – production, additional engineering (6, 9, 11)
- Mike McCarthy – additional production (1, 7, 9), mixing (7)
- Nicolas Vernhes – recording, mixing (2, 3, 5, 6, 9)
- Tom Gloady – assistant engineer
- Jim Vollentine – second engineer (1, 7, 9)
- Brad Bell – additional engineering (6, 9, 11)
- Dave Sardy – mixing (1, 4, 6, 10, 11)
- Ryan Castle – mix engineer (1, 4, 6, 10, 11)
- Cameron Barton – second mix engineer (1, 4, 6, 10, 11)
- Howie Weinberg – mastering
- William Eggleston – cover image
- Matthew Agoglia – sequencing
- Christian Helms – artwork

== Charts ==
Chart (2017)	Peak position
Australian Albums (ARIA)	47
Canadian Albums (Billboard)	20
Japanese Albums Chart	158
US Billboard 200	4
US Top Alternative Albums (Billboard)	1
US Independent Albums (Billboard)	2
US Top Rock Albums (Billboard)	1
