= They Want My Soul =

Studio album by Spoon
- Released: August 5, 2014
- Recorded: September 2013 – March 2014
- Studio: Sunset Sound (Los Angeles, California); Public Hi-Fi (Austin, Texas); Tarbox Road (Cassadaga, New York); The Catacomb (Portland, Oregon)
- Genre: Indie rock; art rock
- Length: 37:35
- Label: Loma Vista; ANTI-
- Producer: Joe Chiccarelli; Dave Fridmann; Spoon

Spoon chronology
Transference (2010)	They Want My Soul (2014)	Hot Thoughts (2017)

Singles from They Want My Soul
- 1. "Rent I Pay" Released: June 10, 2014; 2. "Do You" Released: July 1, 2014; 3. "Inside Out" Released: October 27, 2014

They Want My Soul is the eighth studio album by American rock band Spoon. It was released on August 5, 2014, through the band's new label, Loma Vista Recordings. It is the band's first album to feature Alex Fischel, who plays keyboards and guitar.

== Background ==
The band took several years off following the release of Transference in 2010, giving each member time to explore other projects. Frontman Britt Daniel explained that the band members were "all a little burned out", and that he personally needed "something that was going to reinvigorate me, to excite me about working on new stuff again." To this end, Daniel formed the group Divine Fits with Dan Boeckner of Wolf Parade, which recorded and released the album A Thing Called Divine Fits in 2012. Jim Eno produced albums for other bands during the downtime, while Rob Pope toured with his band The Get Up Kids, and Eric Harvey recorded a solo album.

== Recording ==
The band first met to record with Joe Chiccarelli in September 2013 with very little material written, opting to take some time to explore different songwriting approaches together. Daniel later said that the early sessions "felt, to some degree, like we were getting back to the essence of Spoon; just having fun playing together, and [...] figuring out new ways of doing what we've always done." Several songs were recorded during these early sessions with Chicarelli, though some of the material was ultimately scrapped.

The group began working with Dave Fridmann in January 2014, staying at his studio in Cassadaga, New York, during the sessions. Daniel credited much of the album's aesthetic to Fridmann, stating: "His sound is kind of all over it. He has a really unique manner about him, a really cool perspective; he kind of maxes everything out. We've never worked with somebody like that before - somebody with such a strong sense of their own style."

== Release ==
On May 27, 2014, the band posted an image to their Facebook page with the words "SPOON," "R.I.P.," and "JUNE 10" printed in white against a black background. This led to some speculation about whether a new album or single might be released on that date. The following week, Britt Daniel and Jim Eno announced the album's title and release date in an interview with NPR Music. On June 10, the letters "R.I.P." were revealed to stand for the title of the album's lead single, "Rent I Pay". The song was released that day, as well as the album's track listing and artwork.

In July, the band announced a first-of-its-kind "vinyl gratification" initiative. From July 15 through the album's release date, all pre-orders of the vinyl album through participating independent record stores would immediately receive a free 10-inch 45 RPM record containing three of the album's tracks: "Rent I Pay", "Inside Out", and "Do You". 150 different record stores within the United States participated.

== Reception ==
Professional ratings
Aggregate scores
Source	Rating
AnyDecentMusic?	7.7/10
Metacritic	81/100
Review scores
Source	Rating
AllMusic	4/5 stars
Chicago Tribune	3.5/4 stars
Cuepoint (Expert Witness)	B+
Entertainment Weekly	B+
The Guardian	4/5 stars
Los Angeles Times	3.5/4 stars
NME	7/10
Pitchfork	8.6/10
Rolling Stone	4/5 stars
Spin	8/10

They Want My Soul received universal acclaim from music critics. At Metacritic, which assigns a normalized rating out of 100 to reviews from mainstream critics, the album received an average score of 81, based on 42 reviews, awarding the band its fifth "universal acclaim" tag of its career. Michael Roffman wrote in his review for Consequence of Sound that "the Austin rockers once again sound fresh, jubilant, and ready to have fun with their music — a first since their Got Nuffin EP back in 2009." Rolling Stone's Jon Dolan described the album as "an immediate grabber on par with the group's best work to date," praising its "rich, luminous sound" and "broad musical palette". Greg Kot of the Chicago Tribune admired the "array of new colors" Alex Fischel brought to the band's sound, stating that the "trance-like, futuristic rush of 'Outlier' sounds particularly fresh". Randall Roberts of the Los Angeles Times felt that much of the album's success could be attributed to "a tension between experimentation and allegiance to form", an aspect highlighted by Chiccarelli and Fridmann's production work. Stephen Carlick of Exclaim! concluded in his eight out of ten review: "Following the longest between-album wait of their career, They Want My Soul is a bold and swaggering declaration that Spoon have undoubtedly still got it — in spades." The Village Voice's Pazz & Jop annual critics' poll named They Want My Soul as the ninth-best album of 2014.

A few reviewers felt the album sounded a bit too similar to the band's past efforts. In a seven out of ten star review, Billy Hamilton wrote for Under the Radar that "Despite the band's four-year vacation, They Want My Soul doesn't tread much fresh ground. Essentially, this is Spoon as Spoon has always been," but clarified: "While it's sonically nothing new, what Spoon offers is still infinitely more polished than the work of any of their contemporaries." Jamie Milton of DIY stated that "They Want My Soul is in a slight catch 22; it's exciting to hear a band so resolutely in their zone, but on the flipside it doesn't offer anything remotely new, and that's the opposite of exciting." Matthew Fiander of PopMatters, however, thought the familiarity of the album's sound worked to its advantage: "They Want My Soul [is] another strong record from the band, one that pushes forward in interesting ways while still staying rooted in Spoon's signature sound. If it stumbles, it does so rarely and in search of the new."

== Track listing ==
All tracks are written by Britt Daniel, except where noted.

No.	Title	Writer(s)	Producer(s)	Length
1.	"Rent I Pay"		Dave Fridmann, Spoon	3:09
2.	"Inside Out"		Fridmann, Spoon	5:02
3.	"Rainy Taxi"		Fridmann, Spoon	3:58
4.	"Do You"		Joe Chiccarelli, Spoon	3:33
5.	"Knock Knock Knock"		Fridmann, Spoon	4:39
6.	"Outlier"	Daniel, Jim Eno, Eric Harvey	Chiccarelli, Spoon	4:22
7.	"They Want My Soul"		Chiccarelli, Spoon	3:22
8.	"I Just Don't Understand" (Ann-Margret cover)	Marijohn Wilkin, Kent Westberry	Spoon	2:38
9.	"Let Me Be Mine"		Chiccarelli, Spoon	3:26
10.	"New York Kiss"	Daniel, Dan Wilson	Chiccarelli, Spoon	3:27
Total length:				37:35

== Personnel ==
Spoon

- Britt Daniel
- Jim Eno
- Rob Pope
- Alex Fischel
- Eric Harvey

Production

- Spoon – production
- Dave Fridmann – production (tracks 1–3, 5), mixing (tracks 1–7, 10), engineering
- Joe Chiccarelli – production (tracks 4, 6, 7, 9, 10), engineering
- Mike McCarthy – mixing (tracks 8, 9)
- Britt Daniel – engineering
- Jim Eno – engineering
- Brad Bell – engineering
- Matt Gerhard – engineering
- Graham Hope – engineering
- Howie Weinberg – mastering
- Janet Weiss – song sequencing

Additional musicians

- Milcah Jiménez – backing vocals (tracks 4–6)

Artwork

- Matthew Jacobson – art direction, design
- Britt Daniel – art direction, design
- Eric Harvey – design assistance
- Andy Gregg – symbolization
- Julian Baker – scribe
- Todd Baxter – photography

== Charts ==
=== Weekly charts ===
Chart (2014)	Peak position
Australian Albums Chart	43
Belgian Albums Chart (Flanders)	112
Canadian Albums Chart	10
Dutch Albums Chart	50
Japanese Albums Chart	100
UK Independent Albums Chart	14
US Billboard 200	4
US Top Rock Albums	3
US Top Alternative Albums (Billboard)	2
US Vinyl Albums (Billboard)	1

=== Year-end charts ===
Chart (2014)	Position
US Top Rock Albums	57
US Alternative Albums (Billboard)	36
