= Maxïmo Park discography =

Discography of English rock band Maxïmo Park

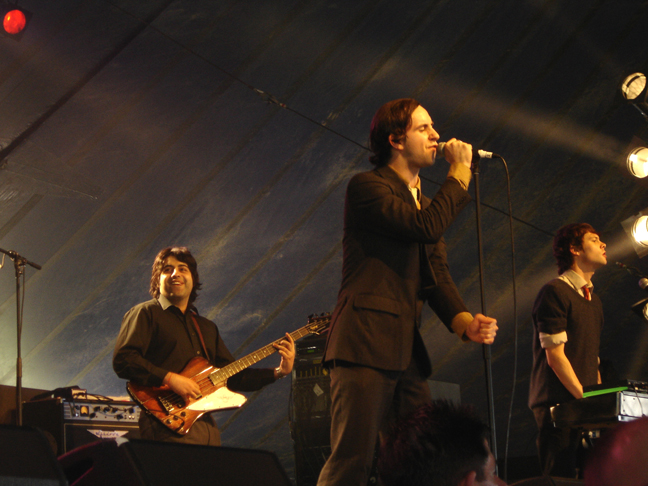
- Maxïmo Park performing at Radio 1's Big Weekend in 2005.
- Studio albums: 8
- Extended plays: 3
- Live albums: 4
- Compilation albums: 2
- Singles: 27
- Music videos: 23

Maxïmo Park are an alternative rock band from Newcastle upon Tyne, England. Founded in the city in 2000, the band currently includes Paul Smith (lead vocals), Duncan Lloyd (guitar), and Tom English (drums), with founding members Archis Tiku (bass guitar) and Lukas Wooller (keyboard) retiring in 2014 and 2019 respectively. Maxïmo Park's discography consists of seven studio albums, one live album, two compilation albums, one EP, twenty-three singles and twenty-three music videos.

Maxïmo Park released their debut album, A Certain Trigger in May 2005 on Warp Records. The record was met with considerable critical acclaim, reached a respectable number 15 on the UK Albums Chart, and was certified Gold in the UK. Five different singles were released from the album, with the most successful being "Graffiti", which peaked at number 15 on the UK Singles Chart in May 2005. In January 2006, the group released a compilation album named Missing Songs, which consisted of nine B-sides from A Certain Trigger, as well as demo versions and remixes. The following year, the band released their second effort, Our Earthly Pleasures, which was produced by Gil Norton. The album was released on 2 April 2007 and was preceded by the first single from the record, "Our Velocity". The album was the band's most successful to date, achieving a peak position of number 2 on the UK Albums Chart (as did 2021's Nature Always Wins). The album also received gold certification.

The group released their third studio album, Quicken the Heart on 11 May 2009, and it debuted at number 6 on the UK Albums Chart. The record was their most successful in Switzerland and Germany to date. Two singles were released from the album; "The Kids Are Sick Again", which reached number 50 on the UK Singles Chart, and "Questing, Not Coasting", which failed to chart.

Their seventh album, Nature Always Wins was released in 2021.

== Albums ==
=== Studio albums ===
List of studio albums, with selected chart positions and certifications
Title	Album details	Peak chart positions										Certifications
Title	Album details	UK	AUT	BEL (Fl)	FRA	GER	IRE	ITA	NL	SCO	SWI	Certifications
A Certain Trigger	Released: 16 May 2005; Label: Warp; Formats: LP, CD	15	70	—	102	25	67	—	— (Note: A Certain Trigger did not enter the Dutch Album Top 100, but peaked at number 11 on the Dutch Alternative Albums chart.)	45	—	BPI: Gold
Our Earthly Pleasures	Released: 2 April 2007; Label: Warp; Formats: LP, CD, CD/DVD, download	2	50	88	165	14	52	69	42	5	34	BPI: Gold
Quicken the Heart	Released: 11 May 2009; Label: Warp; Formats: LP, CD, CD/DVD, download	6	58	86	145	13	—	—	95	6	22	
The National Health	Released: 11 June 2012; Label: V2; Formats: LP, CD, download	13	62	—	—	17	—	—	—	16	55	
Too Much Information	Released: 3 February 2014; Label: Daylighting; Formats: LP, CD, download	7	49	141	—	24	—	—	—	22	88	
Risk to Exist	Released: 21 April 2017; Label: Daylighting, Cooking Vinyl; Formats: LP, CD, download	11	—	—	—	58	—	—	—	12	—	
Nature Always Wins	Released: 26 February 2021; Label: PIAS, Prolifica; Formats: LP, CD, download	2	—	—	—	27	—	—	—	1	76	
Stream of Life	Released: 27 September 2024; Label: Lower Third; Formats: LP, CD, download	21	—	—	—	—	—	—	—	5	—	
"—" denotes releases that did not chart.

=== Live albums ===
List of live albums, with selected chart positions
Title	Album details	Peak chart positions		
Title	Album details	UK Sales	UK Indie	SCO
Found on Film: BBC Live Sessions	Released: 5 June 2006; Label: Warp Records; Format: CD+DVD	—	—	—
10th Anniversary Live: London Roundhouse 17/11/15	Released: 17 November 2015; Label: Concert Live Ltd; Format: 2×CD	—	—	—
10th Anniversary Live: Manchester Albert Hall 18/11/15	Released: 18 November 2015; Label: Concert Live Ltd; Format: 2×CD	—	—	—
As Long As We Keep Moving	Released: 1 March 2019; Label: Cooking Vinyl; Format: LP, CD, CD+DVD, download	34	9	40
"—" denotes releases that did not chart.

=== Compilation albums ===
List of compilation albums
Title	Album details
Missing Songs	Released: 27 July 2005; Label: Warp; Format: CD
iTunes Essentials	Released: 23 May 2011; Label: N/A; Format: Digital download

== EPs ==
List of EPs
Title	Album details
What is Truth and Lies... Garcia Marquez	Released: 2002; Label: (Self-released); Format: CDR
12	Released: 16 November 2009; Label: Warp; Format: 12"
Too Much Information EP	Released: 3 February 2014; Label: Daylighting; Format: CD included in the deluxe edition of Too Much Information
Alternatives	Released: 2 February 2018; Label: Daylighting; Format: Digital download
Live From The Coast	Released: 13 May 2021; Label: Prolifica; Format: Digital download (Live session at King Edward's Bay)
By The Riverside	Released: 1 July 2021; Label: Prolifica; Format: Digital download (Live session at RiversideNCL venue)

== Singles ==
List of singles, with selected chart positions, showing year released and album name
Title	Year	Peak chart positions										Certifications	Album
Title	Year	UK	UK Indie	AUS	BEL (Fl)	EU	GER	MEX Air.	POL	SCO	SWI Air	Certifications	Album
"The Coast Is Always Changing"	2004	121	—	—	—	—	—	—	—	—	—		A Certain Trigger
"Apply Some Pressure"	2005	20	2	—	—	—	—	—	—	26	—	BPI: Silver	A Certain Trigger
"Graffiti"	2005	15	2	—	—	—	—	—	—	16	—		A Certain Trigger
"Going Missing"	2005	20	3	—	—	40	—	—	—	20	—		A Certain Trigger
"Apply Some Pressure" (re-issue)	2005	17	2	—	—	34	—	—	—	15	—		A Certain Trigger
"I Want You to Stay"	2006	21	1	—	—	42	—	—	—	18	—		A Certain Trigger
"Our Velocity"	2007	9	1	98	—	20	87	—	—	4	—	BPI: Silver	Our Earthly Pleasures
"Books from Boxes"	2007	16	2	—	—	—	75	—	40	9	—		Our Earthly Pleasures
"Girls Who Play Guitars"	2007	33	2	—	—	—	—	—	—	11	—		Our Earthly Pleasures
"Karaoke Plays"	2007	133	4	—	—	—	—	—	—	39	—		Our Earthly Pleasures
"The Kids Are Sick Again"	2009	50	1	—	—	99	72	45	—	2	—		Quicken the Heart
"Questing, Not Coasting"	2009	— (Note: "Questing, Not Coasting" did not enter the UK Singles Chart, but peaked at number 24 on the UK Physical Singles Chart.)	47	—	—	—	—	—	—	33	—		Quicken the Heart
"Hips and Lips"	2012	126	—	—	—	—	—	—	—	—	—		The National Health
"The Undercurrents"	2012	—	—	—	—	—	—	—	—	—	—		The National Health
"The National Health"	2012	—	—	—	—	—	—	—	—	—	—		The National Health
"Leave This Island""	2014	— (Note: "Leave This Island" did not enter the UK Singles Chart, but peaked at number 7 on the UK Physical Singles Chart.)	36	—	68	—	—	—	—	—	96		Too Much Information
"Random Regrets / On the Sly"	2014	— (Note: "Random Regrets/On The Sly" did not enter the UK Singles Chart, but peaked at number 68 on the UK Physical Singles Chart.)	—	—	—	—	—	—	—	—	—		Non-album single
"Midnight on the Hill"	2014	— (Note: "Midnight on the Hill" did not enter the UK Singles Chart, but peaked at number 25 on the UK Physical Singles Chart.)	—	—	—	—	—	—	—	—	—		Too Much Information
"Give, Get, Take"	2014	—	—	—	—	—	—	—	—	—	—		Too Much Information
"Risk to Exist"	2017	—	—	—	—	—	—	—	—	—	—		Risk to Exist
"What Did We Do to You to Deserve This?"	2017	—	—	—	—	—	—	—	—	—	—		Risk to Exist
"Get High (No I Don't)"	2017	—	—	—	—	—	—	—	—	—	—		Risk to Exist
"North By North East" (Note: "North By North East" was recorded for The Great Exhibition of the North)	2018	—	—	—	—	—	—	—	—	—	—		Non-album single
"Child of the Flatlands"	2020	—	—	—	—	—	—	—	—	—	—		Nature Always Wins
"Baby, Sleep"	2020	—	—	—	—	—	—	—	—	—	—		Nature Always Wins
"I Don't Know What I'm Doing"	2020	—	—	—	—	—	—	—	—	—	—		Nature Always Wins
"Great Art"	2022	— (Note: "Great Art" did not enter the UK Singles Chart, but peaked at number 10 on the UK Physical Singles Chart.)	—	—	—	—	—	—	—	—	—		Non-album singles
"Versionen Von Dir"	2022	—	—	—	—	—	—	—	—	—	—		Non-album singles
"Merging Into You" (featuring Du Blonde)	2022	—	—	—	—	—	—	—	—	—	—		Non-album singles
"Favourite Songs"	2024	—	—	—	—	—	—	—	—	—	—		Stream Of Life
"Your Own Worst Enemy"	2024	—	—	—	—	—	—	—	—	—	—		Stream Of Life
"The End Can Be As Good As The Start"	2024	—	—	—	—	—	—	—	—	—	—		Stream Of Life
"Quiz Show Clue"	2024	—	—	—	—	—	—	—	—	—	—		Stream Of Life
"—" denotes releases that did not chart.

=== Promotional singles ===
Title	Year	Album
"Wraithlike"	2009	Quicken the Heart
"Write This Down"	2012	The National Health
"Brain Cells"	2014	Too Much Information

== Music videos ==
Year	Title	Director(s)
2004	"The Coast Is Always Changing"	Mat Fleming, Christo Wallers & Clive Tonge
January 2005	"Apply Some Pressure" (Version 1)	Jaron Albertin
March 2005	"Graffiti"	Lynn Fox
June 2005	"Going Missing"	Chris Cairns
September 2005	"Apply Some Pressure" (Version 2)	Diamond Dogs
January 2006	"I Want You to Stay"	Ramon Bloomberg
February 2007	"Our Velocity"	Nima Nourizadeh
May 2007	"Books from Boxes"	Daniel Wolfe
July 2007	"Girls Who Play Guitars"	Leslie Ali
October 2007	"Karaoke Plays"	Amy Neil
April 2009	"The Kids Are Sick Again"	
May 2009	"Questing, Not Coasting"	
May 2012	"Hips and Lips"	Luke Bellis
May 2012	"Write This Down"	
June 2012	"The National Health"	
September 2012	"The Undercurrents"	
November 2013	"Brain Cells"	Matt Stokes
February 2014	"Leave This Island"	Matt Stokes
May 2014	"Midnight on the Hill"	The Marshall Darlings
October 2014	"Give, Get, Take"	Matt Stokes
January 2017	"Risk to Exist"	Steve Gullick
March 2017	"What Did We Do to You to Deserve This?"	James&James
March 2017	"Get High (No, I Don't)"	James&James
May 2017	"What Equals Love?"	Deborah Bower

== Live films ==
Year	Details
2006	Found on Film ('Live at Brixton Academy' and 'Live at Newcastle Academy' segments): Released: 5 June 2006; Label: Warp Records; Format: CD+DVD
2009	Monument (15 December 2007 show at Newcastle Arena, inter-cut with band interviews): Released: 11 May 2009; Label: Warp Records; Format: DVD included in the special edition of Quicken The Heart
2019	As Long As We Keep Moving (Live studio session film): Released: 1 March 2019; Label: Cooking Vinyl; Format: CD+DVD, download

== Compilation and soundtrack appearances ==
A number of Maxïmo Park's songs have been included on compilation discs. Their song "Wasteland" appeared on the War Child album Help!: A Day in the Life in 2005. An acoustic version of their song "Going Missing" was featured on the CD Radio 1's Live Lounge, and their cover of The Proclaimers' "I'm Gonna Be (500 Miles)" was featured in its sequel Radio 1's Live Lounge 2. A cover of Justin Timberlake and Clipse's "Like I Love You", with a slightly altered, satirical ending referring of Paul growing up in Billingham listening to records, featured on a compilation celebrating BBC Radio 1's 40th Anniversary. An instrumental version of one of the song "Going Missing" appeared as in the film Stranger than Fiction.

The band has also recorded covers of:

- "Just Dance" (Lady Gaga cover)
- "Miss Independent" (Ne-Yo cover)
- "Was There Anything I Could Do?" (The Go-Betweens cover)
- "Diamonds and Pearls" (Prince cover)
- "Shiver" (Natalie Imbruglia cover)

The band's songs have also been featured on numerous video games. Their song "Apply Some Pressure" has appeared on the games Burnout Revenge, SSX on Tour and SingStar Rocks!, whilst "Apply Some Pressure", "Books from Boxes", "The Coast Is Always Changing", "Girls Who Play Guitars", "Going Missing", "Graffiti" and "I Want You to Stay" are all downloadable tracks for SingStar on the PlayStation 3. "Our Velocity" appeared on the demo for Project Gotham Racing 4 and the song "The Unshockable" features on the soundtrack to the game FIFA 08. Their song "Girls Who Play Guitars" is a downloadable track for Rock Band.
