= As Long As We Keep Moving =

Video by Maxïmo Park
- Released: 1 March 2019
- Recorded: 28 September 2018
- Studio: Vada Studios, Alcester
- Genre: Indie rock
- Length: 35:30
- Label: Daylighting; Cooking Vinyl
- Producer: Adrian Bushby, George Perks, Jeremy Cooper

Maxïmo Park chronology
Risk to Exist (2017)	As Long As We Keep Moving (2019)	Nature Always Wins (2021)

As Long As We Keep Moving is an album and film of a live studio session conducted by British indie rock band Maxïmo Park. It was released in March 2019 through their own Daylighting imprint as well as Cooking Vinyl. Paul Smith commented that one reason for creating the package was to capture the energy of the songs' live arrangements in contrast to the studio setting, as it had been a long time since their last official live film release. It also marks the departure of founding member and keyboardist Lukas Wooller, who left the band coinciding the release campaign.

== Release ==
Originally planned for release on 22 February, the recording was released in March both as a standalone CD and as a 2-disc CD/DVD hardback book package with several pages of photographs with psychedelic treatments in keeping with the editing style of the video. The release was preceded by a premiere of the film at Tyneside Cinema on 21 February, followed by a Q&A with the band. Pre-orders from the band's official store came with a bonus CD of three songs recorded in the soundcheck for the live session.

== Track listing ==
No.	Title	Writer(s)	Length
1.	"Get High (No, I Don't)"	Duncan Lloyd, Paul Smith	3:25
2.	"I Want You To Stay"	Lukas Wooller, Smith	3:48
3.	"Girls Who Play Guitars"	Lloyd, Smith	3:19
4.	"Questing, Not Coasting"	Lloyd, Smith	3:41
5.	"The National Health"	Lloyd, Wooller, Smith	3:04
6.	"A19"	Lloyd, Smith	2:19
7.	"What Equals Love?"	Lloyd, Smith	3:51
8.	"Limassol"	Archis Tiku, Smith	3:46
9.	"Midnight on the Hill"	Lloyd, Smith	4:42
10.	"Books From Boxes"	Lloyd, Smith	3:35
Total length:			35:30

Pre-Order Bonus Disc
No.	Title	Length
1.	"By The Monument"	3:13
2.	"The Hero"	3:44
3.	"The Undercurrents"	3:51

== Personnel ==
Maxïmo Park

- Paul Smith – vocals
- Duncan Lloyd – guitars
- Lukas Wooller – keyboards
- Tom English – drums
- Paul Rafferty – bass guitar (credited as 'Featuring Paul Rafferty', as Rafferty was not an official member of the band at the time of recording, although he featured on previous studio album Risk to Exist)
