= Nature Always Wins =

2021 studio album by Maxïmo Park

Studio album by Maxïmo Park
- Released: 26 February 2021
- Genre: Indie rock
- Length: 44:35
- Label: Prolifica Inc.
- Producer: Ben H. Allen III

Maxïmo Park chronology
Risk to Exist (2017)	Nature Always Wins (2021)	Stream of Life (2024)

Singles from Nature Always Wins
- 1. "Child of the Flatlands" Released: 14 September 2020; 2. "Baby, Sleep" Released: 14 October 2020; 3. "I Don't Know What I'm Doing" Released: 27 November 2020

Nature Always Wins is the seventh studio album by English indie rock band Maxïmo Park. It was released on 26 February 2021 and reached number two on the UK Albums Chart, putting it level with Our Earthly Pleasures (2007) as the band's highest-charting album. The album was received positively by music critics, who compared it favourably to the band's early albums.

== Composition ==
The album was produced during the COVID-19 pandemic and was Maxïmo Park's first as a trio, following the departure of keyboardist Lukas Wooller. Wooller had moved to Australia with his wife. The album was produced by Atlanta-based producer Ben H. Allen, who collaborated remotely with the Newcastle upon Tyne-based band during the pandemic.

The track "Why Must a Building Burn" attacks the government response to the Grenfell Tower fire in 2017. The song also references the band's former merchandiser Nick Alexander, who was killed in the Bataclan concert hall attack. Tracks including "Versions of You", "Ardour" and "Baby, Sleep" were inspired by frontman Paul Smith's new responsibilities as a father. "Ardour", a song about parenting, features Pauline Murray of the punk rock band Penetration. Maxïmo Park had long been friends with Murray, having rehearsed in a studio named Polestar that she owns. Smith said that the name of the album came from a line of the final track "Child of the Flatlands", about nature slowly reclaiming the outskirts of a city. He said that recent natural disasters had taught him that humanity is at the mercy of nature.

== Commercial performance ==
After its release, the album topped the UK Albums Chart in its midweek update, at around 1,500 copies more than Alice Cooper's Detroit Stories, while Architects' For Those That Wish to Exist was at number three. By the time the chart was published, Architects beat Maxïmo Park to number one by 550 copies. Nature Always Wins was the band's first top-10 entry since Too Much Information in 2014, and joint with Our Earthly Pleasures (2007) as the band's top-charting album. Nature Always Wins spent no more weeks in the chart. The album did top the UK Independent Albums Chart. It also charted for one week on Germany's GfK Entertainment charts, at number 27.

== Critical reception ==
Professional ratings
Aggregate scores
Source	Rating
Metacritic	80/100
Review scores
Source	Rating
AllMusic	4/5 stars
Clash	8/10
DIY	3.5/5 stars
The Line of Best Fit	8/10
NME	4/5 stars
No Ripcord	8/10

Review aggregator Metacritic gives Nature Always Wins a score of 80/100 based on ten reviews from music critics, all of which were positive. It is the band's highest-rated album on Metacritic, ahead of debut A Certain Trigger, which averaged 75/100 from 19 professional reviews in 2005.

Heather Phares of AllMusic noted that the album moved away from the political themes of the band's three previous albums, instead having philosophical lyrics about relationships, similar to A Certain Trigger. Damian Jones of NME praised the album, though he found "Why Must a Building Burn" to be "brutal but jarringly upbeat". On No Ripcord, reviewer Juan Egardo Rodríguez considered it to be the band's best album since Quicken the Heart in 2009, and highlighted the track "All of Me", which he compared to "polar opposites" R.E.M. and Europe. Robin Murray of Clash called it Maxïmo Park's best album for a decade, and noted how its political content was less overt than the preceding Risk to Exist (2017).

== Track listing ==
All tracks are written by Paul Smith, Duncan Lloyd and Thomas English, except where noted.

Nature Always Wins track listing
No.	Title	Writer(s)	Length
1.	"Partly of My Making"		4:03
2.	"Versions of You"	Smith; Lloyd; English; Ben Allen	4:37
3.	"Baby, Sleep"		3:13
4.	"Placeholder"		2:48
5.	"All of Me"	Smith; Lloyd; English; Allen	3:41
6.	"Ardour" (featuring Pauline Murray)	Smith; Lloyd; English; Jemma Freese	3:17
7.	"Meeting Up"		3:51
8.	"Why Must a Building Burn?"	Smith; Lloyd; English; Paul Rafferty	3:02
9.	"I Don't Know What I'm Doing"		2:50
10.	"The Acid Remark"		3:32
11.	"Feelings I'm Supposed to Feel"		4:25
12.	"Child of the Flatlands"		5:16
Total length:			44:35

== Personnel ==
Maxïmo Park

- Paul Smith – lead vocals, engineering, field recording
- Duncan Lloyd – bass, guitar, piano, synthesizer, background vocals, engineering, field recording
- Tom English – drums, percussion, field recording

Additional personnel

- Ben H. Allen III – production, mixing, bass, guitar, percussion, programming, synthesizer
- Heba Kadry – mastering
- Alex Blamire – engineering
- Annie Leeth – engineering
- Ben Etter – engineering
- Robert Whiteley – engineering
- Tom Etherington – drums, design
- Em Cole – band photo
- Laura Lancaster – cover painting
- John David Lawson – photography, painting photography

== Charts ==
Chart performance for Nature Always Wins
Chart (2021)	Peak position
German Albums (Offizielle Top 100)	27
Scottish Albums (OCC)	1
Swiss Albums (Schweizer Hitparade)	76
UK Albums (OCC)	2
UK Independent Albums (OCC)	1

== See also ==
- List of UK Independent Albums Chart number ones of 2021
- List of UK top-ten albums in 2021
