= Quicken the Heart =

Studio album by Maxïmo Park
- Released: 11 May 2009
- Recorded: October 2008
- Studio: Hesby Street, Los Angeles
- Genre: Alternative rock, indie rock, post-punk revival
- Length: 37:30
- Label: Warp
- Producer: Nick Launay

Maxïmo Park chronology
Our Earthly Pleasures (2007)	Quicken the Heart (2009)	The National Health (2012)

Singles from Quicken the Heart
- 1. "Wraithlike" Released: 24 March 2009; 2. "The Kids Are Sick Again" Released: 4 May 2009; 3. "Questing, Not Coasting" Released: 13 July 2009

Quicken the Heart is the third studio album by Maxïmo Park. It was released on 11 May 2009. It debuted at No. 6 on the UK Albums Chart.

== Album information ==
The album is available on vinyl, regular CD, special edition CD and DVD pack and digital download. A T-shirt was also made available with the album. The album was produced by Nick Launay, of Yeah Yeah Yeahs, Nick Cave and Talking Heads production fame.

The special edition contains the regular CD album along with a DVD titled Monument, which features a 68-minute-long tour-film taken from the band's sold out show at Newcastle's Metro Radio Arena in December 2007, including live performances and exclusive backstage footage. The first 500 special editions purchased through the band's website were sent out signed by one of the band members.

Prior to the album's release, Maxïmo Park released opening track "Wraithlike" as a free download and as a limited edition 7" vinyl single. The vinyl single was limited to 250 copies and was only available at the band's 24 March 2009 free concert in Newcastle. The first proper single from the album was "The Kids Are Sick Again", released 4 May 2009. The second single was "Questing, Not Coasting", released on 13 July 2009.

== Reception ==
Professional ratings
Aggregate scores
Source	Rating
Metacritic	61/100
Review scores
Source	Rating
AllMusic	3/5 stars
The Daily Telegraph	4/5 stars
The Daily Vault	C−
Drowned in Sound	6/10
The Guardian	3/5 stars
NME	8/10
The Observer	2/5 stars
Pitchfork	5.5/10
Spin	3.5/5 stars
State	2/5 stars

Critical reception for the album was generally mixed. Reviewing the album for Clash magazine, writer Steve Harris commented that "they haven't lost their knack for writing an infectious tune, and the album packs more punch than their previous long-player" and that Maxïmo Park could "become one of the summer's essential bands." Culturedeluxe also gave a largely positive review to the album.

Q magazine awarded the album 3 out of 5 stars, and commented that "Once again, Smith's lyrical camera is in macro mode, scrutinising love's tiny details....Smith's eccentricities still elevate Maxïmo Park above the guitar-pop herd." Paul Smith told Drowned in Sound that "In Another World (You Would've Found Yourself by Now)" is "about feeling self-righteous even though we all have similar primal impulses."

== Track listing ==
No.	Title	Writer(s)	Length
1.	"Wraithlike"	Lloyd, Smith	2:29
2.	"The Penultimate Clinch"	Lloyd, Smith	2:36
3.	"The Kids Are Sick Again"	Lloyd, Smith, Wooller	3:04
4.	"A Cloud of Mystery"	Wooller, Smith	3:01
5.	"Calm"	Lloyd, Smith	3:07
6.	"In Another World (You Would've Found Yourself by Now)"	Lloyd, Smith	2:59
7.	"Let's Get Clinical"	Smith, Wooller	3:53
8.	"Roller Disco Dreams"	Smith, Lloyd	3:25
9.	"Tanned"	Smith	3:35
10.	"Questing, Not Coasting"	Lloyd, Smith	3:41
11.	"Overland, West of Suez"	Tiku, Wooller, Lloyd, Smith	2:46
12.	"I Haven't Seen Her in Ages"	Smith, Lloyd	3:00

UK iTunes-only bonus track
No.	Title	Writer(s)	Length
13.	"Lost Property"	Lloyd, Smith	3:11

Australian edition bonus track
No.	Title	Length
13.	"Tales of the Semi-Detached"	1:57

=== Monument DVD ===
- Recorded live at Newcastle Arena, 15 December 2007
1. "Girls Who Play Guitars"
2. "Graffiti"
3. "Our Velocity"
4. "A Fortnight's Time"
5. "Parisian Skies"
6. "I Want You to Stay"
7. "Karaoke Plays"
8. "By the Monument"
9. "The Unshockable"
10. "Limassol"
11. "Books from Boxes"
12. "Acrobat"
13. "Going Missing"

== Personnel ==
- Paul Smith – vocals
- Duncan Lloyd – guitar, backing vocals, bass on track 6
- Archis Tiku – bass guitar
- Lukas Wooller – keyboard, organ
- Tom English – drums

== Charts ==
Chart (2009)	Peak position
Austrian Albums (Ö3 Austria)	58
Belgian Albums (Ultratop Flanders)	86
Dutch Albums (Album Top 100)	95
French Albums (SNEP)	145
German Albums (Offizielle Top 100)	13
Scottish Albums (OCC)	6
Swiss Albums (Schweizer Hitparade)	22
UK Albums (OCC)	6
