= Our Velocity =

Single by Maxïmo Park

from the album Our Earthly Pleasures
- B-side: "Distance Makes"; "Mary O'Brien"
- Released: 19 March 2007
- Recorded: 2006
- Genre: Post-punk revival
- Length: 3:26
- Label: Warp
- Songwriters: Duncan Lloyd, Paul Smith
- Producer: Gil Norton

Maxïmo Park singles chronology
"I Want You to Stay" (2006)	"Our Velocity" (2007)	"Books from Boxes" (2007)

Music video
- "Our Velocity" on YouTube

"Our Velocity" is a song by English indie rock band Maxïmo Park. It was released on 19 March 2007 as the lead single from their second studio album, Our Earthly Pleasures (2007). The music was written by guitarist Duncan Lloyd and the lyrics by lead singer Paul Smith. According to Smith, the song is about the wars that the UK was involved in at the time, such as Afghanistan and Iraq.

"Our Velocity" became Maxïmo Park's first UK Top 10 single, reaching number 9 on 25 March 2007 on the UK Singles Chart and number 1 on the UK Indie Chart within a week of its physical release.

== Critical reception ==
The song has been highly regarded and in VH1's "50 Greatest Songs of 2007 So Far", it placed at number 1. Teletext's music page Planet Sound named "Our Velocity" as the best single of 2007.

== Music video ==
The music video was directed by Nima Nourizadeh. It features the band being multiplied in a white room while playing the song.

== Usage in media ==
In August 2007, a segment of "Our Velocity" was used as the title music for the BBC's coverage of Reading and Leeds Festival.

The song was featured on Hollyoaks in 2007. It is also included in the video games Project Gotham Racing 4 (2007) and Guitar Hero: On Tour Modern Hits (2009).

The song was also featured in promos for Cartoon Network's You Are Here block.

== Track listings ==
- CD:
1. "Our Velocity"
2. "Distance Makes"
3. "Mary O'Brien"
- 7-inch white vinyl:
1. "Our Velocity"
2. "Pride Before a Fall"
- 7-inch red vinyl:
1. "Our Velocity"
2. "Robert Altman"
- 1st-week-only download:
1. "Our Velocity" (home demo version)
2. "Our Velocity" (first live performance)

== Charts ==
Chart (2007)	Peak position
UK Singles (OCC)	9
UK Indie (OCC)	1
Australia (ARIA)	98
US Euro Digital Tracks (Billboard)	20
Germany (GfK)	87
Scotland Singles (OCC)	4

== Certifications ==
Region	Certification	Certified units/sales
United Kingdom (BPI)	Silver	200,000^{‡}
^{‡} Sales+streaming figures based on certification alone.
