= The Kids Are Sick Again =

Single by Maxïmo Park

from the album Quicken the Heart
- Released: 4 May 2009
- Recorded: October 2008
- Studio: Hesby Street, Los Angeles
- Genre: Post-punk revival
- Length: 3:05
- Label: Warp
- Songwriters: Duncan Lloyd, Lukas Wooller (Music), Paul Smith (Lyrics)
- Producer: Nick Launay

Maxïmo Park singles chronology
"Karaoke Plays" (2007)	"The Kids Are Sick Again" (2009)	"Questing, Not Coasting" (2009)

Music video
- "The Kids Are Sick Again" on YouTube

"The Kids Are Sick Again" is a song by English rock band Maxïmo Park. It is the first single released from their third studio album, Quicken the Heart. The single was released on 4 May 2009. The song entered the UK singles chart at #50.

Frontman Paul Smith explained to the NME that this song is about the effect of advertisements on the youth today. He said: "I guess I thought society as a whole is bombarded by advertisements and to me that's why the kids are sick again. It's a funny sounding phrase but it's a serious song - so it's a nice blend of being amused, but [also] I hope people sit up and take notice of it." Drummer Tom English added: "They [the youth of today] can't express themselves anymore and this is for them."

Smith told Drowned in Sound: "The first line ('The comforting ache of the summer holiday') indicates that queasy feeling of adolescent isolation that I remember experiencing. The song's ultimate feeling is of escape and I think the music builds to that release after a pulsing, atmospheric beginning."

== Music video ==
Shortly after its release, frontman Paul Smith said of its video:

Here's our new video. It starts off dark but there are unique LED lights that illuminate each section. We used special effects that make us look a bit Max Headroom. If you've never heard of Max Headroom go to your nearest search engine, but not before you've watched this video!

— Paul Smith on the music video for "The Kids Are Sick Again"

== Track listings ==
The track listing was revealed via e-mail to fans signed up to the bands mailing list and also made available on their online store.

CD

1. "The Kids Are Sick Again" – 3:05
2. "Russian Dolls" – 2:58

7" 1 (Yellow vinyl)

1. "The Kids Are Sick Again" – 3:05
2. "Tales of the Semi-Detached" – 1:58

7" 2 (Orange vinyl)

1. "The Kids Are Sick Again" (acoustic) – 2:53
2. "History Books" – 2:45

Digital Download

1. "The Kids Are Sick Again" (Demo Version)

iTunes Download EP

1. "The Kids Are Sick Again" – 3:05
2. "Russian Dolls" – 2:58
3. "Tales of the Semi-Detached" – 1:58
4. "History Books" – 2:45

== Charts ==
Chart (2009)	Peak position
UK Singles (OCC)	50
UK Indie (OCC)	1
Euro Digital Tracks (Billboard)	99
Germany (GfK)	72
Mexico Ingles Airplay (Billboard)	45
Scottish Singles (OCC)	2
