= Karaoke Plays =

Single by Maxïmo Park

from the album Our Earthly Pleasures
- B-side: "George Brown" "Like I Love You"
- Released: 3 December 2007
- Recorded: 2006
- Genre: Post-punk revival
- Length: 4:08
- Label: Warp
- Songwriters: Duncan Lloyd (Music), Paul Smith (Lyrics)
- Producer: Gil Norton

Maxïmo Park singles chronology
"Girls Who Play Guitars" (2007)	"Karaoke Plays" (2007)	"The Kids Are Sick Again" (2009)

Music video
- "Karaoke Plays" on YouTube

"Karaoke Plays" is a song by English rock band Maxïmo Park. It is the fourth and final single released from their second studio album, Our Earthly Pleasures. The single was released on 3 December 2007. Among the single's B-sides includes a cover of Justin Timberlake and Clipse's "Like I Love You", of which the band originally recorded for the compilation album Radio 1: Established 1967, released three months earlier celebrating the fourtieth anniversary of BBC Radio 1 singing on air.

The music video for "Karaoke Plays", of which the band doesn't appear in, was directed by Amy Neil and in the first half, depicts a group of couples traveling and making out on a Double-decker bus, and in the second half, arrive at their intended location, a beach, and party and continue their activities there for the remainder of the video.

== Track listings ==
=== Enhanced CD ===
1. "Karaoke Plays" (Radio Edit) – 3:50
2. "George Brown" – 3:13
3. "Like I Love You" – 3:37
4. Exclusive Enhanced Content:
- "Karaoke Plays" video
- Animated lyric booklet
- "Our Velocity" ringtone

=== 7" vinyl #1 (Numbered white vinyl with free poster) ===
1. "Karaoke Plays" – 4:08
2. "Jean Baudrillard"

=== 7" vinyl #2 (Numbered silver vinyl with free poster) ===
1. "Karaoke Plays" (Live at 1LIVE) – 4:20
2. "Jonathan Cole"

=== Digital Exclusive 1 (Recordstore Bundle Only) ===
1. "Karaoke Plays" (Acoustic Version) – 4:28

=== Digital Exclusive 2 (Recordstore Bundle Bonus Track) ===
1. "Karaoke Plays" (Live at 1LIVE) – 4:20
