= Books from Boxes =

Single by Maxïmo Park

from the album Our Earthly Pleasures
- B-side: "I'm Gonna Be (500 Miles)" "The Unshockable" (Original Demo Version)
- Released: 11 June 2007
- Recorded: 2006
- Genre: Post-punk revival
- Length: 3:28
- Label: Warp
- Songwriters: Duncan Lloyd (Music), Paul Smith (Lyrics)
- Producer: Gil Norton

Maxïmo Park singles chronology
"Our Velocity" (2007)	"Books from Boxes" (2007)	"Girls Who Play Guitars" (2007)

Music video
- "Books from Boxes" on YouTube

"Books from Boxes" is the second single from Our Earthly Pleasures, the second album from the English rock band, Maxïmo Park. The single was released on 11 June 2007 and became their fifth UK Top 20 single, peaking at #16 in the UK Singles Chart. A music video was released for the song, which was directed by Daniel Wolfe, and features the Scottish actress, singer, model and makeup artist Kathleen McDermott.

== Track listing ==
CD

1. "Books from Boxes" (Radio Edit)
2. "I'm Gonna Be (500 Miles)" (Radio 1 Live Version) [The Proclaimers Cover]
3. "The Unshockable" (Original Demo Version)

7" 1 (White Vinyl)
A. Books from Boxes"
B. Obstinate Ideas"

7" 2 (Blue Vinyl)
A. "Books from Boxes" (Original Demo Version)
B. "Don McPhee"

Digital exclusive 1 (Recordstore Bundle Only)

1. "Books from Boxes" (Acoustic Version)

Digital exclusive 2 (Recordstore Bundle Only)

1. "Books from Boxes" (Live in Amsterdam)

The two digital exclusives were only available until the single was released.

== Charts ==
Chart (2007)	Peak position
UK Singles (OCC)	16
UK Indie (OCC)	2
Germany (GfK)	75
Poland (ZPAV)	40
Scotland (OCC)	6
