= P3 Charity =

P3 Charity (People Potential Possibilities)
- Founded: 1972
- Type: Nonprofit
- Headquarters: Eagle House, Cotmanhay Road Ilkeston, Derbyshire DE7 8HU
- Location: England, UK
- CEO: Mark Simms, OBE
- Website: https://p3charity.org

P3 Charity (People Potential Possibilities) is a registered charity that supports people facing homelessness, mental health challenges and social isolation. Operating across 57 local authorities, it works in partnership with local councils, the NHS and other local organisations across England. The charity was founded in 1972 but has been operating as P3 Charity since 2004.

The charity helps people through a range of services, including advice and practical support, supported accommodation and signposting to specialist local agencies such as drug and alcohol rehabilitation.

Mark Simms OBE has been the chief executive since 2002.

== History ==
Originally known as the Good Shepherd Trust, P3 Charity was founded in Wolverhampton in 1972 as a night shelter in a disused cinema. By 2004, the charity had grown across the Black Country, Staffordshire and Derbyshire, reaching more people and officially changing its name to P3 Charity: People Potential Possibilities.

As the organisation continued to grow in terms of reach and types of services it provided - expanding into mental health and youth services, as well as homelessness prevention - P3 Charity started joining forces with other institutions to increase impact. This included a merger with London-based youth club, Rugby Portobello Trust in 2009; the Amber Trust, a mental health charity based in Derbyshire and University of the First Age (UFA), a national organisation that supported young people with life skills, education and housing.

In 2023, P3 Charity was nationally recognised for its 'People Board' - a first of its kind - when it won the Trustee Board of the Year at the Charity Times Awards. Composed of people who use P3 services, the board was praised for its strategy to involve the voices of the people in support in organisation wide decisions.

Since then, P3 Charity has grown its brand to match the scale and ambition of the organisation. In 2025, the charity launched a new brand and redeveloped website, creating more accessible resources that makes it easier for people to access support.

== Structure ==
P3 Charity is part of the P3 Group alongside P3 Housing. While P3 Charity delivers support services and provides housing directly to people, P3 Housing owns and manages the properties from which many of these services are delivered.

As the landlord, P3 Housing is responsible for property management, maintenance and repairs. As a Community Benefit Society and Registered Social Landlord, any surplus generated is reinvested into the homes and communities it services.

Under P3 Charity sits the Rugby Portobello Trust (RPT), who merged with the charity back in 2009.

== Chief Executive Officer (CEO) ==
Mark Simms OBE has been P3 Charity's chief executive since 2002. He is most recognised for his role as the interim chair of the Charity Commission from 25 April to 31 December 2025, where he remains a member of the Board.

In recognition of his contributions to P3 Charity and the wider charity sector, Mark has received numerous awards and accolades throughout his career. He was awarded the OBE for services to Social Enterprise in the King's birthday honours June 2024.

== Awards ==
- Change Project of the Year: Charity Times Awards 2026
- Outstanding Tech, Digital or Data Team of the Year: Charity IT Leaders Awards 2025
- Trustee Board of the Year: Charity Times Awards 2023
- Social Enterprise Team of the Year: UK SE100 2023
- Property Innovation: Charity Times Awards 2021
- Queen's Award for Voluntary Services 2020
- Resilience Awards: UK SE100 2019
- Collaboration Award (with ACTion Lincs): Homeless Link Awards 2019
- RBS SE100 Index Winner 2014
- Social and Care Welfare Awards: Charities Aid Foundation 2012
- Best Company to Work For: Sunday Times 2010
- Top 100 Best Small Companies to Work For: The Sunday Times 2007
