= The National Health (album) =

Studio album by Maxïmo Park
- Released: 11 June 2012
- Recorded: Moles, Bath (2011–2012); Rockfield Studios (autumn 2011)
- Genre: Indie rock
- Length: 40:22
- Label: V2
- Producer: Gil Norton

Maxïmo Park chronology
| Quicken the Heart (2009) | The National Health (2012) | Too Much Information (2014) |

Singles from The National Health
- 1. "Hips And Lips" Released: 4 June 2012; 2. "Write This Down" Released: 8 July 2012; 3. "The Undercurrents" Released: 19 August 2012; 4. "The National Health" Released: 21 October 2012

Professional ratings
Aggregate scores
| Source | Rating |
|---|---|
| Metacritic | 73/100 |
Review scores
| Source | Rating |
| AllMusic | 4/5 stars |
| BBC Music | favourable |
| Clash | 4/10 |
| The Fly | 2/5 stars |
| The Guardian | 4/5 stars |
| The Independent | 4/5 stars |
| musicOMH | 3.5/5 stars |
| NME | 8/10 |
| This Is Fake DIY | 5/10 |

The National Health is the fourth studio album by English indie rock band Maxïmo Park. It was released in the United Kingdom on 11 June 2012 by V2 Records. The album was the first by the band to feature a title track. The one-minute opening track, a ballad with piano and strings, has been noted by the band as a deliberate move to disorientate the listener (previous albums have all begun with a fast-paced track, like the title track, "The National Health").

== Singles ==
The first single released from the album was "Hips And Lips" in June 2012. The song joined BBC Radio 1's 'C' list, but only reached No. 171 in the UK singles chart.

"The Undercurrents" was the second single released from the album in August 2012.

== Reception ==
It received mainly positive reviews. The Guardian gave it 4 stars out of 5 calling it "energised and good fun".

NME rated it 8 out of 10, saying "The National Health', you see, is a fully ticked-off shopping list of everything that's unashamedly ace about this band, and it's all been bought from Waitrose – a change from the Tesco Value offerings of 2007's 'Our Earthly Pleasures' and 2009's 'Quicken The Heart'. Maxïmo Park take themselves so seriously, and every song strives for heads-down greatness. 'The Undercurrents' is the one moment they achieve it, transcending everything around it (including Smith's slightly clunky "I won't forget the way you forgive me" hook). It builds, storm-like, into something that might protrude proudly from a catalogue of the Bunnymen, of The Verve, of latter-day Manics, of any Great British Band aware that they are indeed a Great British Band. Maxïmo Park obviously aren't, but for these brief moments the possibilities are there. It's the peak."

== Track listing ==
All lyrics by Paul Smith, all music by Duncan Lloyd, except where noted.

1. "When I Was Wild" (Lukas Wooller) – 1:02
2. "The National Health" (Lloyd, Wooller) – 3:00
3. "Hips And Lips" (Wooller) – 3:32
4. "The Undercurrents" – 4:01
5. "Write This Down" (Archis Tiku, Lloyd, Wooller) – 3:14
6. "Reluctant Love" – 3:17
7. "Until The Earth Would Open" – 3:17
8. "Banlieue" – 2:51
9. "This Is What Becomes of the Brokenhearted" (Wooller) – 3:54
10. "Wolf Among Men" – 2:55
11. "Take Me Home" (Smith, Lloyd) – 2:54
12. "Unfamiliar Places" (Smith) – 3:49
13. "Waves of Fear" – 2:41

– Limited Deluxe Edition with additional 4-Track-Bonus-EP:

1. The Undercurrents (Acoustic Version)
2. Hips And Lips (Acoustic Version)
3. Reluctant Love (Acoustic Version)
4. Until The Earth Would Open (Acoustic Version)

== Personnel ==
Maxïmo Park

- Tom English – drums
- Duncan Lloyd – electric guitar, backing vocals
- Paul Smith – lead vocals
- Archis Tiku – bass guitar
- Lukas Wooller – keyboards

Additional musicians

- Beth Porter – cello on "When I Was Wild"

Technical staff

- Amir Amor – additional recording and production
- Dan Austin – engineering, mixing
- Ben Humphreys – assistant
- Peter Maher – mastering
- Gil Norton – producer

== Charts ==
| Chart (2012) | Peak position |
|---|---|
| Scottish Albums Chart | 16 |
| UK Albums Chart | 13 |
