= Criticism of the response to the Grenfell Tower fire =

Criticism of the response to a 2017 fire in West London

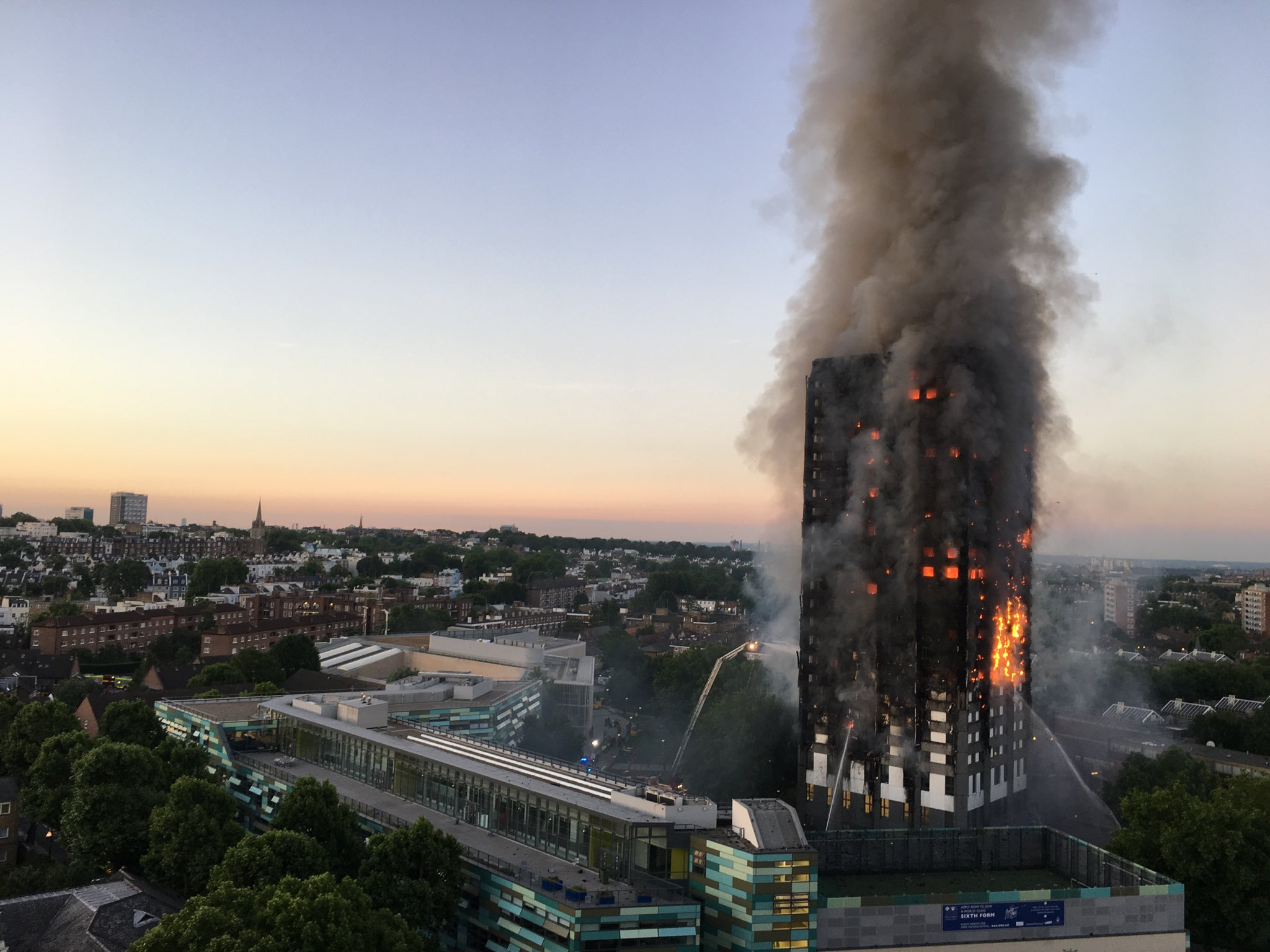
The fire during the early morning of 14 June 2017.

Criticism of the response to the Grenfell Tower fire primarily consisted of condemnation of issues with the emergency response provided by the London Fire Brigade (LFB) and fire safety regulation practices in the United Kingdom at the time. Broader political criticism was also directed at British society, including condemnation of the response by governmental bodies and UK politicians, including Prime Minister Theresa May, and Eric Pickles, the Secretary of State for Communities and Local Government from 2010 until 2015 who allowed Grenfell Tower to be renovated using materials of combustable cladding. Other areas of criticism following the fire ranged from social divisions, deregulation issues, and poor transparency overall.

== Emergency response issues ==
Media reporting included criticism of the response of London Fire Brigade (LFB) and other agencies. The Grenfell Tower Inquiry concluded in October 2019 that mistakes in the response cost lives. Despite this, it also praised the "courage and devotion to duty" of ordinary firefighters.

=== Stay-put policy ===
External image
- Public Fire Notice from nearby KCTMO tower indicating "Stay Put" policy

The fire safety policy for Grenfell Tower was that residents were advised to stay in their flats ("stay put") if a fire broke out in the building, unless it was affecting their flat. This is the standard policy for high rise buildings in the United Kingdom but not accepted practice in many other countries. It relies on the assumption that construction standards such as concrete and fire-resistant doors will allow firefighters to contain a fire within one flat. This was not possible at Grenfell Tower, as the fire spread rapidly via the exterior. Due to this policy, the building was not designed to be fully evacuated. There was only a single narrow staircase, and no centrally activated system of fire alarms that could alert residents.

In a July 2014 Grenfell Tower regeneration newsletter, the KCTMO instructed residents to stay in their flat in case of a fire ("Our longstanding 'stay put' policy stays in force until you are told otherwise") and stated that the front doors for each unit could survive a fire for up to 30 minutes. The May 2016 newsletter had a similar message, adding that it was on the advice of the LFB:

The smoke detection systems have been upgraded and extended. The Fire Brigade has asked us to reinforce the message that, if there is a fire which is not inside your own home, you are generally safest to stay put in your home to begin with; the Fire Brigade will arrive very quickly if a fire is reported.

The advice was repeated to residents who called the fire service. The policy was withdrawn at 02:47, when control room staff were instead told to advise residents to evacuate if possible. At 04:14, the police told onlookers to contact anyone still trapped in the building and tell them to attempt to evacuate immediately.

Many survivors argued that they would have died had they followed the "stay put" advice. Sadiq Khan, the Mayor of London, also criticised the policy: "Thankfully residents didn't take that advice but fled". He added, "These are some of the questions that have to be answered. We have lots of people in London living in tower blocks ... We can't have people's lives being put at risk because of bad advice or lack of maintenance." In her report, Barbara Lane concluded that the principles required for the "stay put" policy to work failed once the fire started spreading across the exterior.

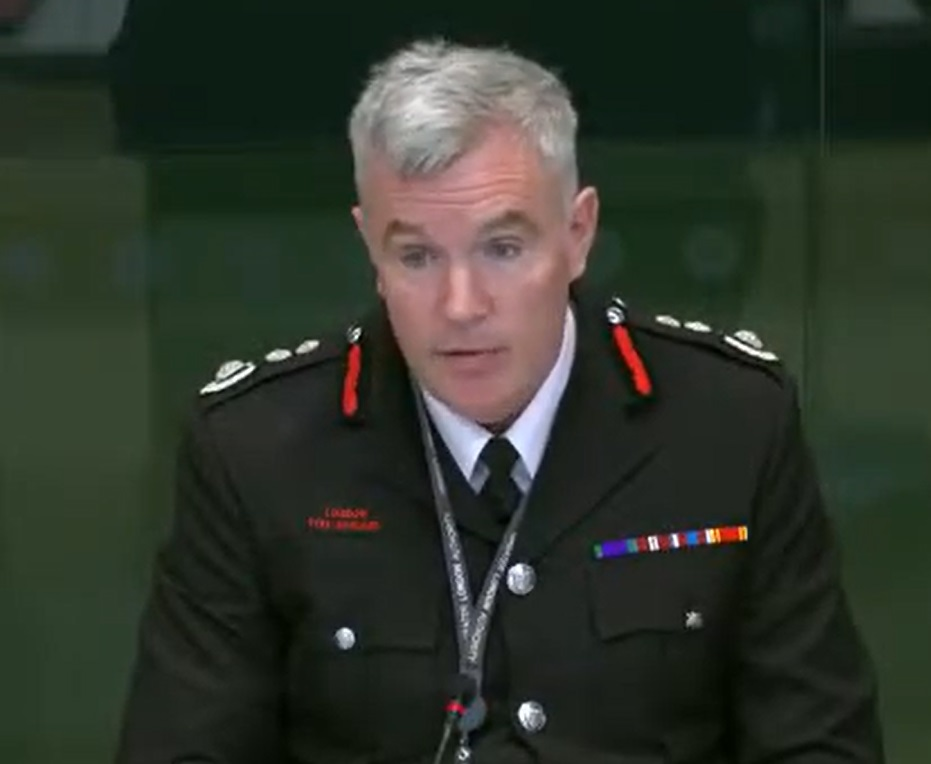
Andy Roe was appointed as the incident commander on site, and formally revoked the "stay put" policy at 02:47, 1 hour and 53 minutes following the outbreak of the fire.

Dany Cotton said Grenfell was unique in terms of volume and behaviour of fire. She said it was a matter for the inquiry, but defended the general "stay put" policy for most high-rise buildings by reasoning that if residents all evacuate at once, they could block firefighters from entering. Furthermore, smoke and fire could be spread within a building by residents opening doors. In her later witness statement to the Inquiry, she said that as the building did not have a central fire alarm system, evacuating the building "would physically require someone to go and knock on every single door and tell people to come out." Since the Grenfell Tower fire, LFB's policy of high-rise buildings with flammable cladding has been changed so that until the cladding is removed, landlords should install alarm systems or have patrols in place so that the building can be evacuated.

The initial incident commander Watch Manager Michael Dowden told the Inquiry that he was preoccupied and uncomfortable dealing with "a very, very dynamic situation" that he was not prepared to deal with, and that he did not consider evacuating the building. He added that in hindsight, he did not believe it would have been possible, as there were not enough firefighters present to evacuate 20 floors. Station Manager Andrew Walton, who was incident commander for a short period after, said that as smoke was spreading to the stairwell and many lobbies, residents could not have escaped and he believed they were safer staying in unaffected flats. Watch Manager Brien O'Keeffe suggested it could have been a "catastrophe" to tell residents to evacuate unaided once the stairwell was filled with smoke. On the other hand, Assistant Commissioner Andrew Roe said that due to the complete failure of the building, he made a decision to change the policy soon after taking over as incident commander.

The Inquiry later concluded that lives had been lost because the policy had not been lifted while the stairs were still passable. It found that the fire officers had not been trained to deal with a situation where they might have to evacuate a tower block.

=== Fire brigade resources ===
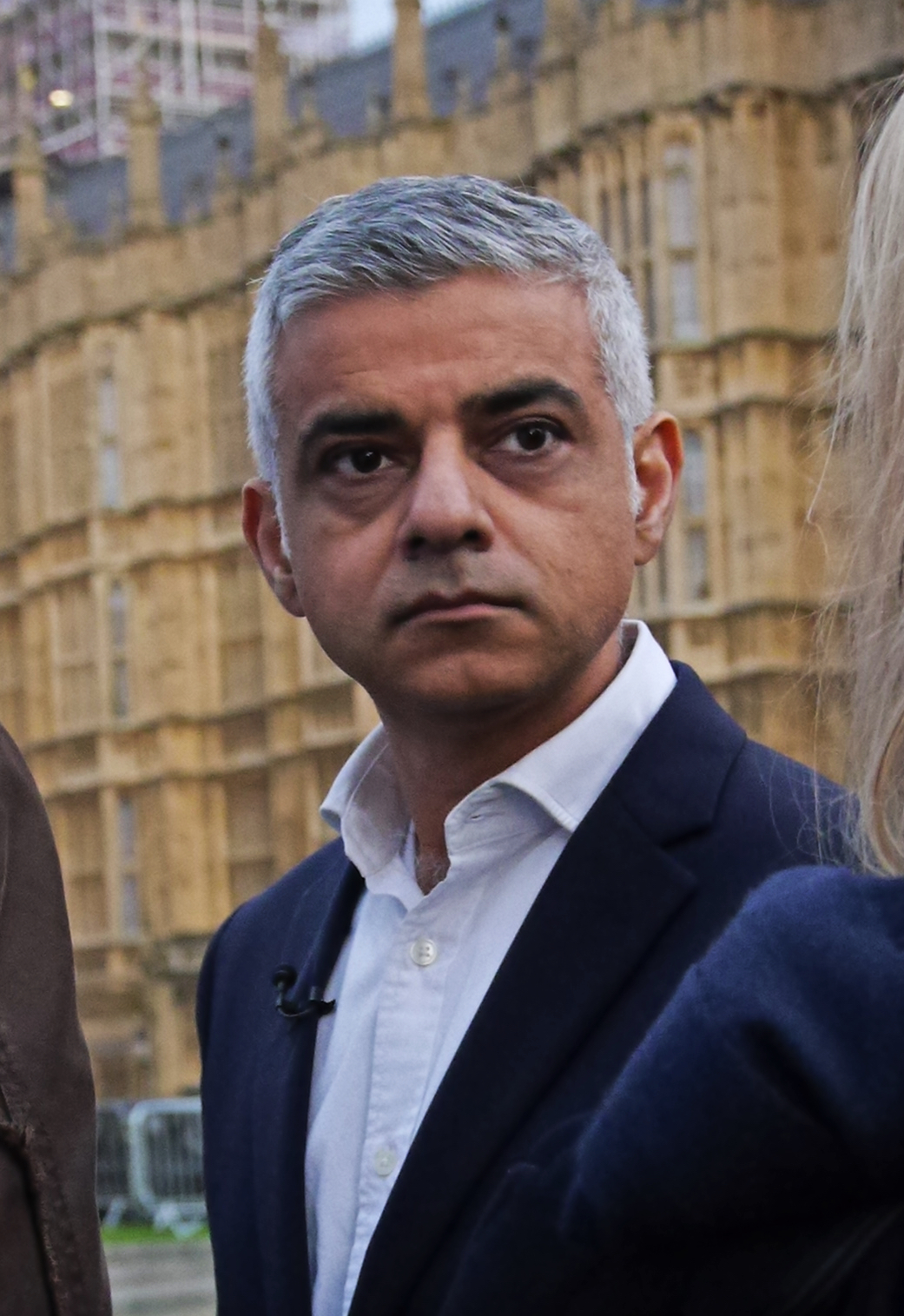
London Mayor, Sadiq Khan, promised to "supply new equipment that LFB needed promptly" and stated he would "not wait for the public inquiry" before doing so

Research by John Sweeney for BBC Newsnight described several issues that hampered the response of the LFB. There was insufficient mains water pressure for the hoses the fire service used and Thames Water had to be called to increase it. Also, a high ladder did not arrive for 32 minutes, by which time the fire was out of control. Matt Wrack of the Fire Brigades Union said, "... having that on the first attendance might have made a difference because it allows you to operate a very powerful water tower from outside the building onto the building." Before the Grenfell fire, 70% of fire brigades would have automatically sent a high ladder to tower fires.

An independent fire expert told the BBC having the ladder earlier could have stopped the fire getting out of control. The LFB told Newsnight the first attendance procedure for tower fires has now been changed from four engines to five engines plus a high ladder unit. Firefighters said inside the building they lacked sufficient 'extended duration' breathing apparatus. They had difficulty getting vital radio messages through due to 'overuse of the system' and from the need to get the signal through layers of concrete. At the inquiry one firefighter described the radios as "useless."

Another issue raised was the height of the aerial appliances. LFB's aerial appliances could reach 32 m (105 ft) high, whereas the tower was 67 m (220 ft) high. A 42 m (138 ft) firefighting platform was borrowed from Surrey, arriving only after the fire had been burning for several hours. Commissioner Dany Cotton said that the LFB had already been planning to buy higher ladders, and that the size of LFB's appliances has been limited by their need to fit on narrow London streets. London mayor Sadiq Khan promised to supply new equipment that LFB needed promptly and stated he would not wait for the public inquiry.

Dany Cotton later said having more firefighters may not have helped as there would not have physically been enough room for them in the building. The single stairwell also restricted access.

=== Smoke ===
One of the major obstacles to the firefighters was that the tower's only stairwell filled with smoke within an hour of the fire breaking out. This made it very difficult for residents to escape unaided; Barbara Lane's report noted that the rate of evacuations slowed after 01:38, and again after 01:58. Furthermore, firefighters were hindered by the near-zero visibility on the stairwell. Crew Manager Aldo Diana said he was "surprised" by the amount of smoke in the stairwell, describing conditions as:

Basically you couldn't see your hand in front of your face. It was just thick black smoke. You didn't see anybody else. You literally had to bump into them.

In section 19 of her report, Barbara Lane notes that smoke was reported in the lobbies of four floors as early as 01:18. By 01:58, the stairwell and seven lobbies were filled with smoke. She suggested that possible causes for this included inadequate fire doors, fire doors being propped open by hoses and problems with the ventilation system.

In October 2018, LFB announced that it is to use specialist hoods to protect people from smoke and toxic fumes for up to 15 minutes. They were purchased from German company Drager at a cost of £90,000 for 650 hoods.

=== Road access ===
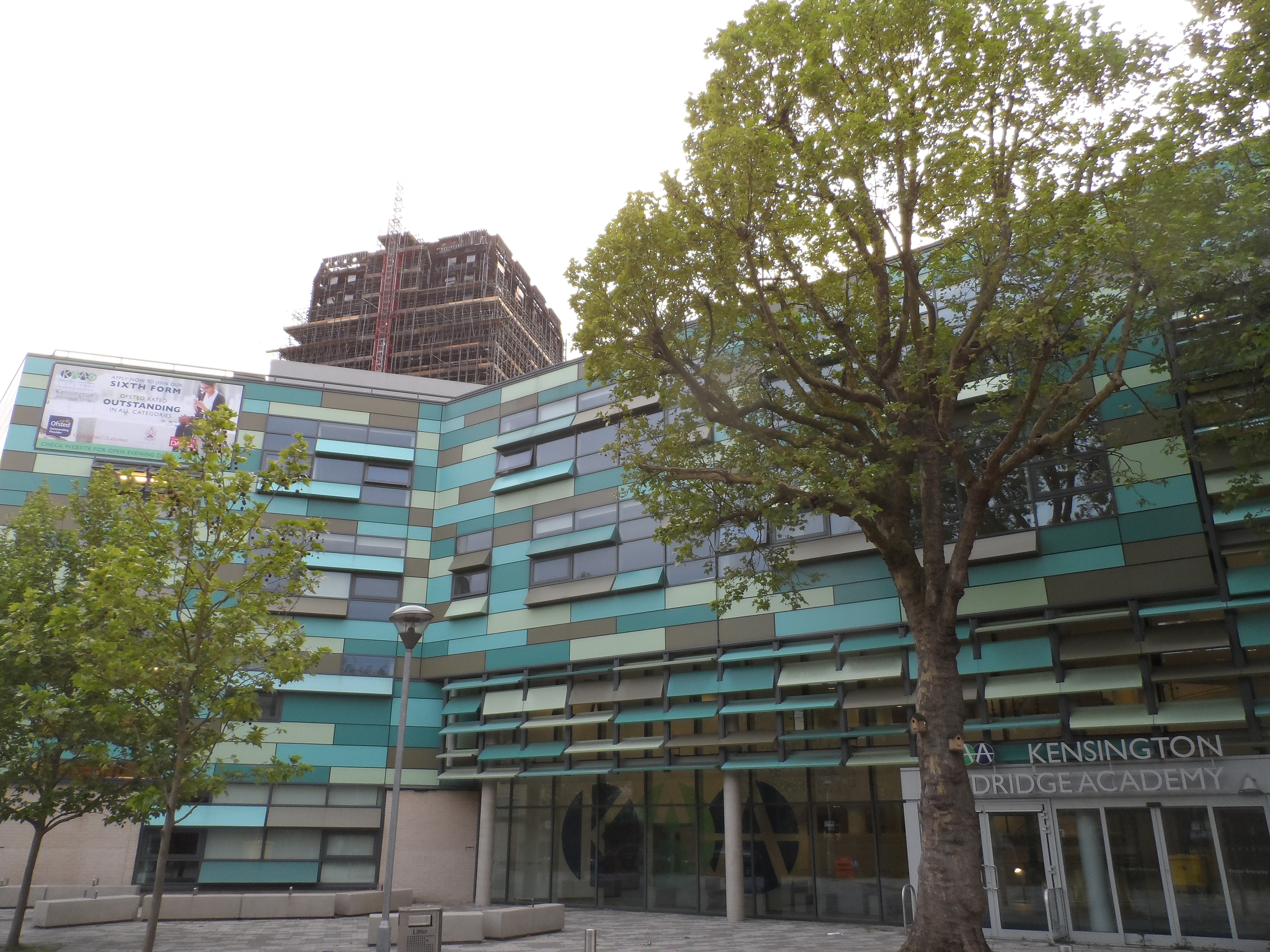
The charred remains of Grenfell Tower (background), with Kensington Aldridge Academy, the secondary school constructed which raised concerns about vehicular access in and around the tower

Kensington and Chelsea Council was warned in 2010 that building a new secondary school very near Grenfell Tower could block access by emergency vehicles. A 2013 blog post by Grenfell Action Group stated, "There is barely adequate room to manoeuvre for fire engines responding to emergency calls, and any obstruction of this emergency access zone could have lethal consequences in the event of a serious fire or similar emergency in Grenfell Tower or the adjacent blocks." The council demolished an 80-bay car park to build the school. This is alleged to have added to congestion and parked cars in streets around Grenfell Tower that were already narrow and made it harder for fire engines to get to the fire.

=== Lack of sprinklers ===
Like the vast majority of high-rise buildings in the UK, Grenfell Tower did not have sprinklers. A BBC Breakfast investigation focusing on half of the UK's council- and housing association-owned tower blocks found that 2% of them had full sprinkler systems. Deaths were 87% lower when buildings with sprinklers caught fire. England, Wales and Scotland now require sprinklers to be installed in newly built tall buildings, since 2007, but there is no requirement to fit them in existing buildings. Dany Cotton has called for sprinklers to be retrofitted in all social housing blocks. David Siber, an advisor to the Fire Brigades Union, said that sprinklers could have prevented the fire from ever spreading beyond the kitchen where it started. Geoff Wilkinson, the building regulations columnist for the Architects' Journal, said that once the fire starting spreading through cladding, sprinklers would have had little effect.

A few days after the fire, the Conservative leader of the council Nicholas Paget-Brown was asked why sprinklers had not been installed in the tower during the recent renovation. Paget-Brown said that the Grenfell Tower residents did not have a collective view in favour of installing sprinklers during the recent renovations. He also said that if they had been installed, it would have delayed the refurbishment and been more disruptive. ITV business editor Joel Hills stated that he had been told that the installation of sprinklers had not even been discussed.

== Criticism of fire safety regulation ==
Reinhard Ries, the fire chief in Frankfurt, Germany, was critical of lax fire regulations in the United Kingdom, contrasting the laws in Germany that ban flammable cladding on buildings higher than 22 m (72 ft) and require segregated fire-stairs and firefighting lifts which can be used by the fire brigade and injured or disabled people.

Russ Timpson of the Tall Buildings Fire Safety Network told The Telegraph that "foreign colleagues are staggered" when they learn that UK regulations permit high-rise buildings to have only a single staircase, and called on the government to review the relevant regulations. New high-rise buildings in England, since 2007, are required to have sprinklers with no requirement to install them in older buildings, and as a result few have sprinklers. Other notable criticisms of UK fire regulations included a change in the law in 1986 under a Conservative government that abolished a requirement that external walls should have at least one hour's fire resistance to prevent fires from re-entering a building and spreading to other apartments.

The New York Times reported that because of the Great Fire of London, UK building codes have historically been overly focused on containing horizontal fire spread between buildings or between units in larger buildings, as opposed to vertical fire spread in high-rise buildings.

The Royal Institute of British Architects fears that flammable cladding will not be totally banned, and they further fear that sprinkler systems and extra escape staircases will not be required. These three measures could have saved lives in Grenfell, according to widespread beliefs.

=== Reviews into fire safety in tower blocks ===
After the fatal Lakanal House fire in 2009, the coroner made a series of safety recommendations for the government to consider in order to improve safety in tower blocks. The report highlighted the flammable panels that covered part of the exterior, the lack of sprinklers, a lack of safety inspections, and that the stay put policy did not suit a building where compartmentalisation had failed.

The Department for Communities and Local Government agreed to hold a review in 2013. Over subsequent years, four ministers were warned about tower block fire risks that had been highlighted by the Lakanal House fire. Ronnie King, a former chief fire officer and secretary of the all-party parliamentary group on fire safety, said that ministers had stonewalled requests for meetings and discussions about tightening rules. King described his attempts to arrange meetings with housing minister Gavin Barwell: "We have had replies, but the replies were to the effect that you have met my predecessor [earlier housing minister James Wharton] and there were a number of matters that we are looking at and we are still looking at it." In March 2014, the All-Party Parliamentary Fire Safety and Rescue Group sent a letter to then Minister for Communities Stephen Williams, warning that similar fires to the one at Lakanal House were possible, especially due to the lack of sprinklers in tower blocks. After further correspondence, Williams replied: "I have neither seen nor heard anything that would suggest that consideration of these specific potential changes is urgent and I am not willing to disrupt the work of this department by asking that these matters are brought forward." In March 2015, at the request of the Department for Communities and Local Government, fire experts at the Building Research Establishment (BRE) studies produced reports assessing the level of fire risk at tower blocks. The experts warned of fatalities unless the danger of flames passing through concealed cavities was addressed.

== Other political criticism and debate ==
There is a political tension between those who focus the blame on technical failures, such as the refrigerator fire and the installation of flammable cladding, and those who focus the blame on politically charged explanation, such as deregulation, spending cuts and neglect.

Bagehot in The Economist and Nick Ferrari accused Labour Party politicians of exploiting the disaster for political gain. In turn, Suzanne Moore in The Guardian, Tanya Gold in the New Statesman and Owen Jones argued that trying to stop the fire from being politicized meant ignoring its causes.

=== Government response ===
The government response was to eventually set up a dedicated benefits line and a fund to support the survivors.

=== Theresa May's personal response ===
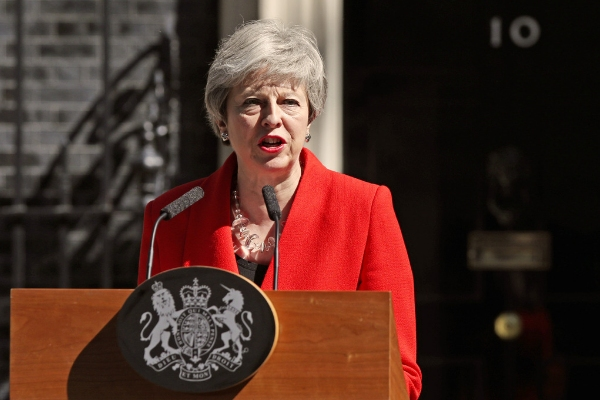
British Prime Minister Theresa May was highly criticised for her refusal to meet survivors of the fire, but rather visit only the emergency services on the scene

On the day after the fire, May made a private visit to Grenfell Tower to speak with members of the emergency services, but did not meet with any of the survivors. Conservative MP Tobias Ellwood stated this was due to security concerns. BBC political editor Laura Kuenssberg commented that May's decision not to meet those who lived in the tower might be interpreted as "indicative of a lack of empathy". An editorial in The Guardian called it May's "Hurricane Katrina moment". Former Conservative cabinet minister Michael Portillo described her meeting with members of the emergency services as "a good thing" but felt she "should have been there with the residents. She wanted an entirely controlled situation in which she didn't use her humanity".

The following day, she visited survivors in hospital and a church that was serving as a relief centre; during the latter visit she was heckled by some of those present. An article written by former Conservative MP Matthew Parris in The Times described her as "a good and moral person, who wants the best for her country, and is not privately unfeeling, ... in public is crippled by personal reserve". Andrea Leadsom, the Leader of the House of Commons, subsequently visited a relief centre at the Rugby Portobello Trust, where she was confronted by residents angered by May's response, and described the prime minister as being "absolutely heartbroken" over events at Grenfell Tower.

In an article for the London Evening Standard on 11 June 2018, May wrote of her regret for the handling of the fire and its public perception.

=== Council response ===
The local council's response to the Grenfell Tower fire has been subject to widespread criticism. Council member Emma Dent Coad, also the newly elected Labour MP for the area (Kensington constituency) and a former board member of KCTMO, accused the council of having failed and betrayed its residents; characterising the fire as "entirely preventable", she added that "I can't help thinking that poor quality materials and construction standards may have played a part in this hideous and unforgivable event". Sadiq Khan called on the government to appoint commissioners to run Kensington and Chelsea council until the May 2018 council elections.

Edward Daffam of the Grenfell Action Group said, "They didn't give a stuff about us. We were the carcass and they were the vultures. North Kensington was like a goldmine, only they didn't have to dig for the gold. All they had to do was to marginalise the people who were living here, and that's what they were doing."

In December 2020, it emerged that the building in which the council had re-housed Grenfell survivors was itself a severe fire hazard, requiring round-the-clock fire safety patrols.

In February 2021, Elizabeth Campbell, the leader of the Royal Borough of Kensington and Chelsea council, apologised for a series of property deals made before 2017 fire.

=== Social division ===
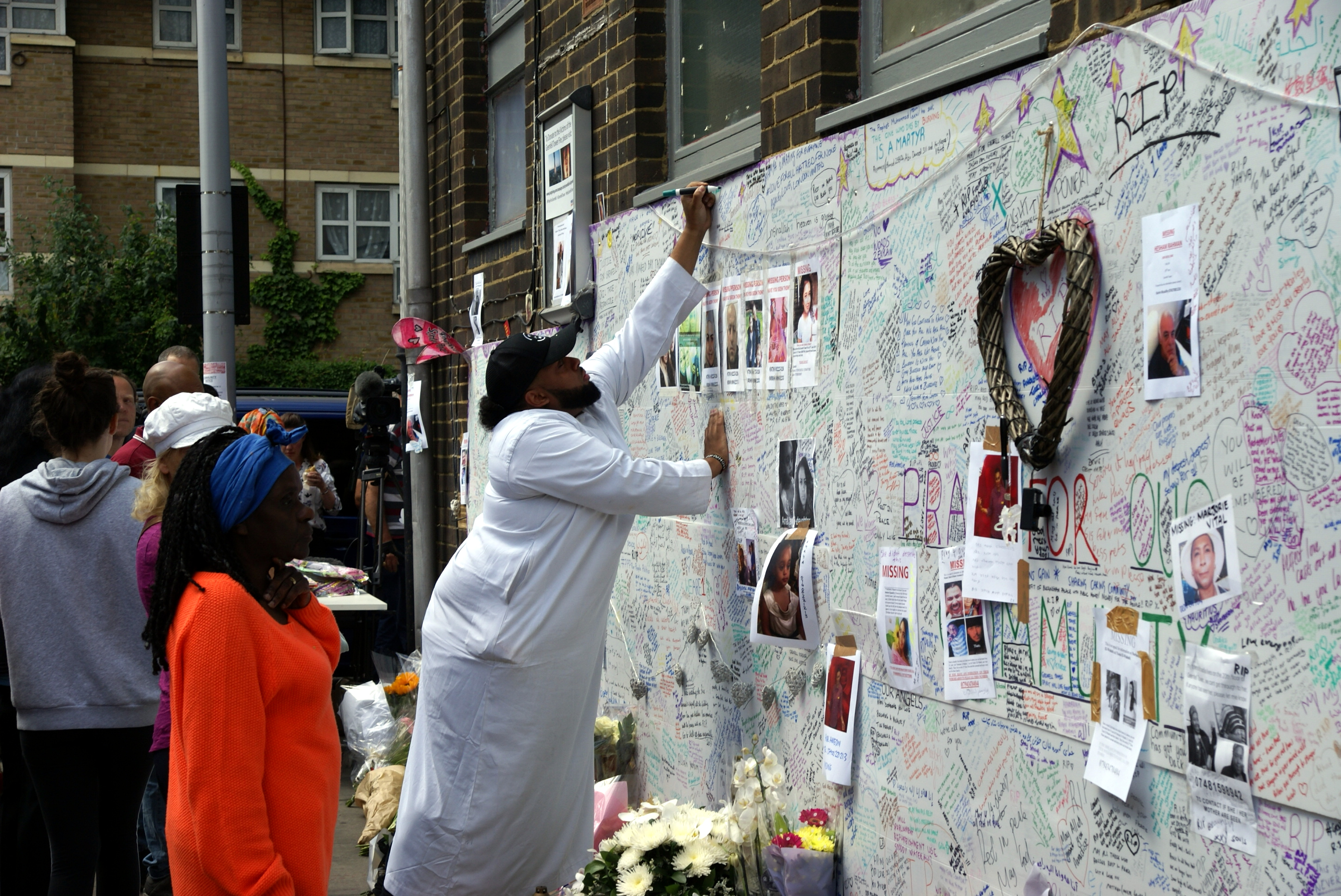
Members of the community add tributes to a tribute wall on Bramley Road, 17 June 2017

Grenfell Tower is in the Royal Borough of Kensington and Chelsea, one of the wealthiest local authorities in the country, containing some of the most expensive houses in the world, and with the highest gap between rich and poor anywhere in the country. Grenfell Tower was populated by poorer, mainly ethnic-minority residents. The Conservative-run council was criticised for neglecting the borough's poorer residents, and some have blamed their neglect as a cause of the fire.

In 2016, the council took £55 million in rent but only invested less than £40 million in council housing. One journalist described the incident as an example of Britain's inequality. Data released in June 2017 by Trust for London and New Policy Institute shows large divides between rich and poor in the borough of Kensington and Chelsea. The analysis found that it is a borough with some very high incomes, as well as the highest average incomes in London, but there are pockets of deprivation, particularly in the north end of the borough, including the ward in which Grenfell Tower is located.

The philosophical difference of providing a high standard of public housing and providing the bare minimum to house only those most in need first occurred as the Lancaster West Estate was being built. Grenfell and the finger blocks were built to Parker Morris standards; the tower provided one- and two-bedroom flats for single occupiers or families without children. The incoming Conservative government revised the standards down, using the Local Government, Planning and Land Act 1980 to replace the mandatory Space in the Home document.

=== Underinvestment ===
After the fire, volunteer people and groups worked to help those made homeless and without possessions. The volunteers criticised council officials for doing little to coordinate these efforts. There were calls to jail those responsible for the fire. Deborah Orr wrote, "We know that fire-safe cladding was available. The idea of being energy efficient and safe was not impossible, or even undesirable in theory. But fire-resistant cladding would have raised the cost for the whole building by an estimated £5,000. That sum may be what people died for."

On 17 June 2017, MPs asked the council to describe why it had amassed £274 million of reserves, after years of underspending, and had not used any of its budget surplus to increase fire safety, given that residents had issued repeated warnings about the Grenfell Tower fire risk. The council actually used the surplus to pay top-rate council taxpayers a £100 rebate shortly before local elections, which returned a Conservative council. After the fire, some former residents of Grenfell Tower still had rent payment taken out of their bank account for the burnt out property by the council.

Residents approved initial plans for fire resistant zinc cladding, but this was later changed to cheaper aluminium cladding with combustible polyethylene core, which residents did not approve, saving nearly £300,000.

=== Neglect ===
The council received further criticism for their lack of support on 18 June 2017. Some families were reported to be sleeping on the floor in local centres four days after the event. A leading volunteer in the relief effort said: "Kensington and Chelsea are giving £10 to the survivors when they go to the hotels – a tenner – there is money pouring in from all these amazing volunteers. We can't get access to this money."

London mayor Sadiq Khan said "years of neglect" by the council and successive governments were responsible for what had been a "preventable accident". There are calls for the council leader and some others to resign.

Dawn Foster, contributing editor on housing for The Guardian, said that this was an "atrocity" that "was explicitly political" and "a symbol of the United Kingdom's deep inequality".

The report on the 2017 Grenfell Tower fire, which resulted in 72 deaths, concluded that long-standing failures by the government, regulators, and industry created a "death trap" and called for stronger safety regulations to prevent future tragedies.

=== Deregulation ===
Labour leader Jeremy Corbyn brought this to the attention of the House; he said these "terrible consequences of deregulation and cutting corners" stemmed from a "disregard for working-class communities".

London Mayor Sadiq Khan said: "Those who mock health and safety, regulations and red tape need to take a hard look at the consequences of cutting these and ask themselves whether Grenfell Tower is a price worth paying." Patrick Cockburn of The Independent criticised deregulation of the building industry by the government, which he described as "cutting red tape". This was contrasted with the increasing complexity of processes faced by prospective benefits claimants including those with mental health issues. Cockburn said long inquiries were not necessary to establish what went wrong. Cockburn said that "The Government is clearly frightened that the burned bodies in Grenfell Towers will be seen as martyrs who died because of austerity, deregulation and outsourcing." Writing in The Guardian, Alan Travis argued that fire safety had been compromised since the early 2000s by moving the responsibility for fire safety checks from the fire brigade to building owners and creating mandatory competition between Local Authority Building Control and private approved inspectors.

=== Social murder ===
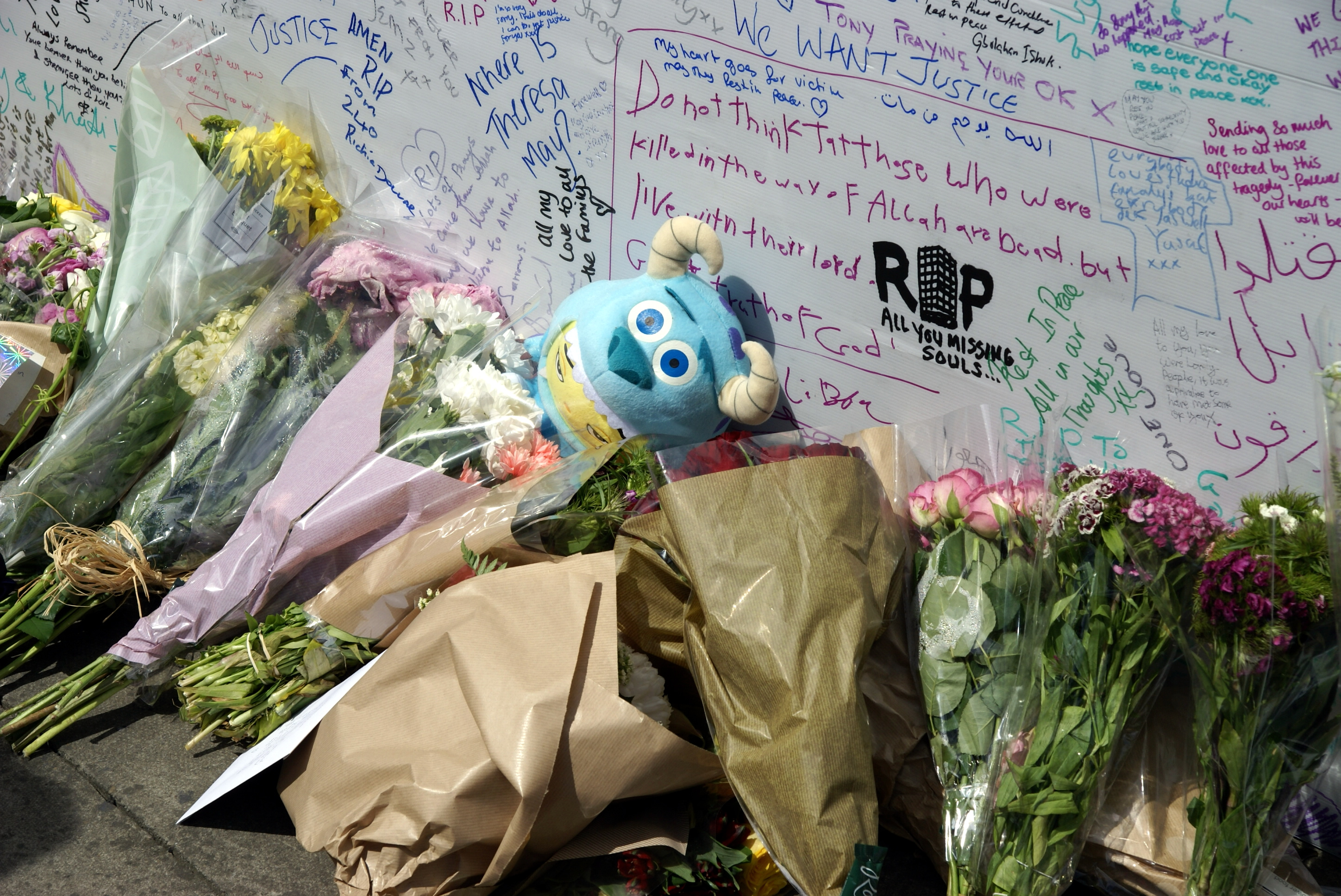
Floral tributes near Bramley Road following the fire, 17 June 2017

In his column on the disaster, Aditya Chakrabortty of The Guardian drew comparisons to the often lethal living and working conditions faced by the working classes and poor in Victorian Manchester, which Friedrich Engels characterised as social murder in his 1845 study The Condition of the Working Class in England. Chakrabortty stated that "those dozens of Grenfell residents didn't die: they were killed. What happened last week wasn't a 'terrible tragedy' or some other studio-sofa platitude: it was social murder . . . Over 170 years later, Britain remains a country that murders its poor." The Shadow Chancellor of the Exchequer, John McDonnell, also said that the fire amounted to "social murder" and that "political decisions in recent decades" led to it, and that "those responsible should be held to account".

=== Poor transparency ===
On 29 June 2017, Kensington and Chelsea London Borough Council held its first full meeting since the fire. The council had tried to exclude the press and public from the meeting, citing safety concerns. Journalists sought an injunction to force the council to let them attend, which was granted. The meeting was adjourned shortly after it began, with members of the council's cabinet saying that to proceed would be prejudicial to the forthcoming public inquiry. Sadiq Khan and Robert Atkinson, Labour group leader on the council, both called for the council's entire cabinet to resign. Atkinson described the situation as "an absolute fiasco". Khan said that it "beggared belief" that the council was trying to hold meetings in secret when the meeting was the first chance the council had to provide some answers and show transparency. He said that some people were asking "whether or not the council was involved in a cover up". Conservative council leader Nicholas Paget-Brown resigned on 30 June 2017.

=== Criticism of the media ===
Jon Snow, a veteran television journalist, used the MacTaggart Lecture at the Edinburgh International Television Festival to complain that the media was "comfortably with the elite, with little awareness, contact or connection with those not of the elite" and this lack of connection was "dangerous". He demanded "Why didn't any of us see the Grenfell action blog?"

=== Conservative Party survey ===
In November 2017, a branch of the Kensington Conservative Party caused anger by sending out a survey to local residents asking them to rate how important the Grenfell Tower fire was, alongside issues such as parking and recycling.
