= Girls Who Play Guitars =

Single by Maxïmo Park

from the album Our Earthly Pleasures
- B-side: "An Unknown" "Sandblasted And Set Free (Original Instrumental Demo)"
- Released: 20 August 2007
- Recorded: 2006
- Genre: Post-punk revival
- Length: 3:12
- Label: Warp
- Songwriters: Duncan Lloyd (Music), Paul Smith (Lyrics)
- Producer: Gil Norton

Maxïmo Park singles chronology
"Books From Boxes" (2007)	"Girls Who Play Guitars" (2007)	"Karaoke Plays" (2007)

Music video
- "Girls Who Play Guitars" on YouTube

"Girls Who Play Guitars" is the third single from Our Earthly Pleasures, the second album from the English rock band Maxïmo Park. The single was released on 20 August 2007. A music video was also released for the song, which was directed by Leslie Ali.

== Track listing ==
CD

1. "Girls Who Play Guitars" (Radio Edit)
2. "An Unknown"
3. "Sandblasted and Set Free" (Original Instrumental Demo)

7" 1 (White Vinyl)

1. "Girls Who Play Guitars"
2. "Warehouse"

7" 2 (Yellow Vinyl)

1. "Girls Who Play Guitars" (Original Demo Version)
2. "Girls Who Play Guitars" (Radio Edit)
3. "(I Remember) Joe Brainard"

Digital exclusive 1 (Recordstore Bundle Only)

1. "Girls Who Play Guitars" (Live Version)

Digital exclusive 2 (Recordstore Bundle Only)

1. "Girls Who Play Guitars" (Acoustic Version)

The two digital exclusives will only be available until the single is released.

== Chart positions ==
Chart (2007)	Peak position
UK Singles Chart	31

== In popular culture ==
- This song was made available for download in the video game Rock Band on 12 June 2008.
