= Too Much Information (album) =

Studio album by Maxïmo Park
- Released: 3 February 2014
- Recorded: Winter 2012 – Summer 2013 in Newcastle, Sunderland, and London
- Genre: Indie rock; post-punk revival
- Length: 35:31
- Label: Daylighting; Vertigo
- Producer: Field Music; Maximo Park; Dave Okumu

Maxïmo Park chronology
The National Health (2012)	Too Much Information (2014)	Risk to Exist (2017)

Singles from Too Much Information
- 1. "Leave This Island" Released: 27 January 2014; 2. "Midnight On The Hill" Released: 12 May 2014; 3. "Give, Get, Take" Released: 1 December 2014

Too Much Information is the fifth studio album by English indie rock band Maxïmo Park. It was released on 3 February 2014 through Daylighting in the UK and Vertigo elsewhere in Europe. The track "Brain Cells" was released to radio stations as a promotional single in late 2013, followed by physical releases of singles "Leave This Island" and "Midnight On The Hill". "Give, Get, Take" was eventually released as a digital single at the end of 2014.

== Album information ==
The bulk of the album was recorded under the supervision of guitarist Duncan Lloyd at the band's own studio in Newcastle towards the end of 2013, but recording initially started at the studio of Peter and David Brewis of Field Music. In an interview frontman Paul Smith described what the brothers brought to some of the tracks they worked on for the record:

Dave kind of took the reins in terms of engineering. He would say "what sort of sound do you want" we said "yeah maybe a round bass sound". Peter Brewis played a bit of marimba on a couple of the songs. So they added a bit of their musical knowledge to the whole thing.

The album also included production contributions from Dave Okumu from The Invisible and was mixed by Nicolas Vernhes who previously worked with Deerhunter on Monomania. B-sides from the album campaign include "A Vague Implication" (from "Leave This Island") and "When I'm Alone" (from "Midnight On The Hill").

An earlier, stripped-down version of "Is It True?" featured as a B-side to the single "Hips And Lips" from The National Health. During the album campaign for Too Much Information, a double A-side single, "Random Regrets / On The Sly", was released on 7-inch vinyl for Record Store Day 2014, consisting of two offcuts from the recording sessions for The National Health and Too Much Information respectively. An interesting feature of this release is that all copies pressed accidentally had the labels pressed onto the wrong sides of the record because of a factory error.

== Critical reception ==
Professional ratings
Aggregate scores
Source	Rating
Metacritic	62/100
Review scores
Source	Rating
Alternative Press	3.5/5 stars
Altsounds	51%
Slant Magazine	3.5/5 stars
NME	7/10 stars
Pitchfork	6.1/10

Too Much Information received positive reviews from critics upon release. At Alternative Press, Tim Karan rated the album three-and-a-half out of five stars, noting that "Although past Maxïmo Park records certainly exhibited diversity, they often sacrificed cohesion in the process; however, Too Much Information has just the right balance of depth, maturity and consistency to ensure success." The NME gave the album 7/10, praising the band's success against "anti-guitar gunfire".

== Track listing ==
All lyrics by Paul Smith; all music by Duncan Lloyd, except where noted.

No.	Title	Writer(s)	Length
1.	"Give, Get, Take"		3:20
2.	"Brain Cells"		3:08
3.	"Leave This Island"	Lukas Wooller	4:00
4.	"Lydia, The Ink Will Never Dry"		3:02
5.	"My Bloody Mind"		3:42
6.	"Is It True?"	Archis Tiku, Wooller, Lloyd	3:45
7.	"Drinking Martinis"		3:31
8.	"I Recognise the Light"		2:15
9.	"Midnight on the Hill"		4:05
10.	"Her Name Was Audre"		2:00
11.	"Where We're Going"	Lloyd, Smith	2:43
Total length:			35:31

German bonus track
No.	Title	Writer(s)	Length
12.	"Out Of Harm's Way"	Wooller	3:10

Japanese bonus tracks
No.	Title	Length
12.	"M.O.R. In Dylan's Bar"	2:41
13.	"Give, Get, Take" (Lukas Wooller's Brute Acid Remix)	5:47

== Deluxe edition Covers EP ==
1. "Middlesbrough Man" (based on Edinburgh Man, originally by The Fall) - 4:00
2. "I'll Be Here in the Morning" (originally by Townes Van Zandt) - 3:02
3. "Lover, Lover, Lover" (originally by Leonard Cohen) - 3:29
4. "Northern Sky" (originally by Nick Drake) - 3:43
5. "Final Day" (originally by Young Marble Giants) - 2:00
6. "Fade Into You" (originally by Mazzy Star) - 4:34
7. "On The Sly" (iTunes-only bonus track) - 3:25

== Personnel ==
Maxïmo Park

- Tom English – drums, percussion
- Duncan Lloyd – electric guitar, backing vocals, bass guitar, keyboards
- Paul Smith – lead vocals
- Archis Tiku – bass guitar
- Lukas Wooller – keyboards
