= Rugby Portobello Trust =

Youth charity in London, England

Rugby Portobello Trust (RPT)
- Founded: 1884
- Type: Nonprofit
- Headquarters: 221 Walmer Road, London W11 4EY
- Location: West London, England, UK
- CEO: Mark Simms, OBE
- Website: https://www.rugbyportobello.org.uk

Rugby Portobello Trust (RPT) is a youth club based in North Kensington, London, and has been providing youth and family support since 1884.

RPT offers a range of educational support, creative and sporting activities, mental health support, mentoring, employment programmes and family services. It is widely known for its football academy that supports local children to make it into professional football.

RPT is most noted for its involvement in the Grenfell fire tragedy, where it used its community reach to set up a residents-only emergency respite centre, securing emergency accommodation for dozens of families directly impacted by the fire.

RPT became a part of P3 Charity in 2009, a registered charity that supports people facing homelessness, mental health challenges and social isolation, helps people through a range of services, including advice and practical support, supported accommodation and signposting to specialist local agencies.

Mark Simms OBE has been the chief executive of RPT and the wider P3 Group since 2002.

== History ==
Rugby Portobello Trust (RPT) brings together a long history of supporting people in North Kensington.

The oldest organisation within RPT, The Rugby Clubs, was founded in 1884 by Arthur Walrond, with the support of Rugby School. Its work has focused on supporting young people in West London for more than a century.

The Portobello Trust was established in 1986 to support young people facing high unemployment, providing employment, training and other practical support.

Portobello Houseshare followed in 1992, providing accommodation and support for homeless young people and care leavers.

In 2003, the three organisations merged to form Rugby Portobello Trust, creating a joined-up organisation offering youth work, education, employment and housing support. The organisation moved into a refurbished Walmer Road Youth Centre in 2005 following a major fundraising campaign.

In 2008, Rugby Portobello Trust (RPT) made the decision to merge with P3 Charity, bringing together local expertise and national reach. The merger was completed in 2009, with RPT becoming part of the P3 Group.

Today, Rugby Portobello Trust (RPT) continues to build on this history, supporting children, young people and families across North Kensington and working alongside local communities to create opportunities and positive futures.

== Grenfell Tower ==
In 2017, the impact of the Grenfell Tower Fire was felt across the country, but particularly by the local community of North Kensington. Based only 5 minutes away, Rugby Portobello Trust (RPT) was at the epicentre of support.

Rugby Portobello Trust (RPT) used its community reach to setup a residents-only emergency respite centre, securing emergency accommodation for dozens of families directly impacted by the fire. In the long term, establishing five new support services directly to support residents, doubling RPT's outreach in the local community.

Alongside housing, the Rugby Portobello Trust provided tens of thousands of pounds worth of phones, phone cards, computers, clothes and toiletries to help people rebuild their lives - totalling to more than £16million worth of donations to directly support residents effected by the fire.

As a result, in 2020, Rugby Portobello Trust volunteers were honoured with the Queen's Award for voluntary service, highlighting the significant impact of local community support.

== Fundraising ==
The Rugby Portobello Trust (RPT) is funded entirely through donations and fundraising. Its income is generated through fundraising events, donations from local businesses and contributions from individual supporters.

The Trust organises a number of annual fundraising and community events, including the Brain Game and The Portobello Dinner, which bring together supporters, businesses and members of the local community. It also hosts the annual RPT Notting Hill Christmas Market, which is open to the wider community and combines fundraising with a programme of seasonal activities.
