= Risk to Exist =

Studio album by Maxïmo Park
- Released: 21 April 2017
- Recorded: Autumn 2016
- Studio: The Loft (Chicago, Illinois)
- Genre: Indie rock
- Length: 39:24
- Label: Daylighting; Cooking Vinyl
- Producer: Tom Schick

Maxïmo Park chronology
Too Much Information (2014)	Risk to Exist (2017)	As Long As We Keep Moving (2019)

Singles from Risk to Exist
- 1. "Risk to Exist" Released: 19 January 2017; 2. "What Did We Do to You to Deserve This?" Released: 3 March 2017; 3. "Get High (No I Don't)" Released: 22 March 2017

Professional ratings
Aggregate scores
Source	Rating
AnyDecentMusic?	6.5/10
Metacritic	67/100
Review scores
Source	Rating
AllMusic	3.5/5 stars
Clash	8/10
Drowned in Sound	8/10
The Line of Best Fit	7/10
NME	3/5 stars
PopMatters	6/10 stars

Risk To Exist is the sixth studio album by British indie rock band Maxïmo Park. It was released on 21 April 2017 through their own Daylighting imprint as well as Cooking Vinyl. The album's lead single was first aired on the Steve Lamacq show on BBC 6 Music on 19 January 2017.

== Background and recording ==
On 14 October 2016, guitarist Duncan Lloyd announced that recording was almost complete on the band's sixth album, then untitled. Writing for the album took place primarily in the UK while recording took place at Wilco's The Loft studio in Chicago through Autumn 2016. The album was produced by Tom Schick, whose previous work includes Wilco, Beck and White Denim and was recorded entirely live. Mimi Parker from the USA band Low features on backing vocals on several tracks on the album.

== Release ==
The album was released in several formats, including deluxe CD and digital editions, transparent vinyl and on tape cassette. Two music videos were produced for the title track and lead single 'Risk To Exist'- One a performance video directed by Steve Gullick, the other a montage of footage from Sky News and MOAS of the European migrant crisis, the political reaction to which underpins the song's lyrics. The latter video was edited by media company Caviar; profits from digital sales of the single were donated to charity.

== Political content ==
The press release for the album's announcement described its lyrical content as being "informed by the dire state of world affairs in 2016 and crumbling political systems", a shift in lyrical focus vocalist Paul Smith was eager to justify. Accompanying some release bundles was a zine entitled Inspiration Information, which made explicit the political nature of the album's lyrics, which heavily reference and comment upon the United Kingdom government austerity programme, its relation to the British class system, and the backlash against the ongoing European migrant crisis which was seen by critics including Smith as dehumanising.

Contents of the zine include essays by Smith on the politics of the album's lyrics, and the impact of changes to the DWP's policies under austerity on the severely disabled; an extract from The Establishment: And How They Get Away with It by British far left political commentator Owen Jones; and less political content, such as photographs by guitarist Duncan Lloyd, and drummer Tom English's notes on the band's change in sound to a more disco-influenced rhythm section.

== Track listing ==
No.	Title	Length
1.	"What Did We Do to You to Deserve This?"	3:24
2.	"Get High (No, I Don't)"	3:30
3.	"What Equals Love?"	3:45
4.	"Risk to Exist"	3:39
5.	"I'll Be Around"	3:43
6.	"Work and Then Wait"	3:02
7.	"The Hero"	3:43
8.	"The Reason I Am Here"	3:40
9.	"Make What You Can"	3:49
10.	"Respond to the Feeling"	3:06
11.	"Alchemy"	4:03
Total length:		39:24

Deluxe edition bonus tracks
No.	Title	Length
1.	"Sharp Tongue"	4:44
2.	"A Brief Dream"	3:01
3.	"All Been Done Before"	3:09
4.	"Work and then Wait (Acoustic Version)"	2:57
5.	"Risk to Exist (Acoustic Version)"	3:40
6.	"Get High (Acoustic Version)"	3:39
7.	"I'll Be Around (Piano Version)"

== Personnel ==
Maxïmo Park

- Paul Smith – vocals
- Duncan Lloyd – guitars
- Lukas Wooller – keyboards
- Tom English – drums

Additional musicians

- Mimi Parker – backing vocals on tracks 1, 4, 5, 7, and 8
- Paul Rafferty – bass guitar

== Charts ==
Chart (2017)	Peak position
German Albums (Offizielle Top 100)	58
Scottish Albums (OCC)	12
UK Albums (OCC)	11
UK Independent Albums (OCC)	4
