= Our Earthly Pleasures =

Studio album by Maxïmo Park
- Released: 2 April 2007
- Recorded: August–December 2006
- Genre: Alternative rock; indie rock; post-punk revival
- Length: 41:47
- Label: Warp
- Producer: Gil Norton

Maxïmo Park chronology
Found on Film (2006)	Our Earthly Pleasures (2007)	Quicken The Heart (2009)

Singles from Our Earthly Pleasures
- 1. "Our Velocity" Released: 19 March 2007; 2. "Books from Boxes" Released: 11 June 2007; 3. "Girls Who Play Guitars" Released: 20 August 2007; 4. "Karaoke Plays" Released: 3 December 2007

Our Earthly Pleasures is the second studio album by Newcastle-based alternative rock band Maxïmo Park. It was released on 2 April 2007 in the UK (and 8 May 2007 in the US), being preceded by the single "Our Velocity", released two weeks previously, on 19 March 2007.

== Album information ==
Album details, including track listing, were released on the NME's website on 22 January 2007. as well as the band's official web site. The album was leaked in various places across the internet in March 2007.

Vocalist Paul Smith states that the title of the album stems from the idea that we are bonded by our experiences, and that several tracks were written to embody specific human emotions. The title of the album appears in the lyrics of "Russian Literature".

"There it is again that lock of hair that won't sit still
Our earthly pleasures distract us against our will."

The band did an album launch party at the Baltic Flour Mill, the contemporary art gallery in Gateshead on 28 March 2007. Another album launch gig took place at HMV Newcastle at midnight on 2 April, to release the album, hometown fans were the first to get hold of Our Earthly Pleasures. A third launch party took place in London, at the 100 Club on Oxford Street, on the evening of 2 April.

The tracks "Our Velocity", "Books from Boxes", "Girls Who Play Guitars" and "Karaoke Plays" have been released as singles. Tickets to the April/May Our Earthly Pleasures Tour went on sale on 2 February 2007. Tickets sold out within one hour to the majority of the venues.

The two US bonus tracks were mislabeled on iTunes Music Store, with track 13 being labeled "Distance Makes" when it was actually the song "Pride Before A Fall", "Distance Makes" was included as the other bonus track. A special edition was also released exclusively in Australia, containing the bonus track "Robert Altman" (Track 13 - 2:24)

The song "The Unshockable" is featured in FIFA 08 and a Johnny Test commercial on Cartoon Network. The song "Our Velocity" is featured on the soundtrack for Project Gotham Racing 4.

== Reception ==
Professional ratings
Aggregate scores
Source	Rating
Metacritic	67/100
Review scores
Source	Rating
AllMusic	3.5/5 stars
Drowned in Sound	7/10
The Guardian	4/5 stars
NME	6/10
Pitchfork	6.3/10
Rolling Stone	3.5/5 stars

Released in April 2007, the album was successful, entering the charts at number two behind Kings of Leon's album Because of the Times. The album reached number two on the UK album charts. Overall critics generally gave positive reviews for the album, the average number of stars given was just over 3.5 out of 5.

Rolling Stone (p. 62) - 3.5 stars out of 5 -- "The U.K. indie band's second album has beefed-up sound and increasingly brilliant, not-at-all-pretentious gems like 'Girls Who Play Guitars'."

Spin (p. 86) - 3 stars out of 5 -- "Maximo Park bring plenty of recognizable spark and smarts to their second album....The record barely pauses for breath."

BBC - 3 stars out of 5 -- "It’s certainly an album that evokes visions of delirious summertime hedonism: its momentum designed for haphazard jumping about in crowds, one sweaty fist in the air whilst the other grapples with a plastic cup of warm lager. Bring It On."

== Track listing ==
All lyrics are written by Paul Smith; all music is composed by Duncan Lloyd, except where noted.

No.	Title	Length
1.	"Girls Who Play Guitars"	3:12
2.	"Our Velocity"	3:20
3.	"Books from Boxes"	3:28
4.	"Russian Literature" (Lukas Wooller)	3:07
5.	"Karaoke Plays"	4:08
6.	"Your Urge" (Wooller)	3:57
7.	"The Unshockable" (Lloyd, Wooller)	3:16
8.	"By the Monument" (Smith)	2:59
9.	"Nosebleed"	3:25
10.	"A Fortnight's Time"	3:01
11.	"Sandblasted and Set Free"	3:58
12.	"Parisian Skies" (Archis Tiku, Lloyd)	3:56

US Bonus Tracks
No.	Title	Length
13.	"Pride Before a Fall"	3:14
14.	"Distance Makes" (Tiku)	2:12

Australian Bonus Tracks
No.	Title	Length
13.	"Robert Altman"	2:23

== Personnel ==
Maxïmo Park

- Tom English – drums
- Duncan Lloyd – guitars
- Paul Smith – vocals
- Archis Tiku – bass guitar
- Lukas Wooller – keyboards

Additional musicians

- Nell Catchpole – violin on "Sandblasted and Set Free"
- Laura Reid – cello on "Sandblasted and Set Free"

== Charts ==
=== Weekly charts ===
Chart (2007)	Peak position
Australian Albums (ARIA)	61
Austrian Albums (Ö3 Austria)	50
Belgian Albums (Ultratop Flanders)	88
Dutch Albums (Album Top 100)	42
French Albums (SNEP)	165
German Albums (Offizielle Top 100)	14
Italian Albums (FIMI)	69
Scottish Albums (OCC)	5
Swiss Albums (Schweizer Hitparade)	34
UK Albums (OCC)	2

=== Year-end charts ===
Chart (2007)	Position
UK Albums (OCC)	103

== Certifications ==
Region	Certification	Certified units/sales
United Kingdom (BPI)	Gold	100,000^{^}
^{^} Shipments figures based on certification alone.
