= Maxïmo Park =

British rock band

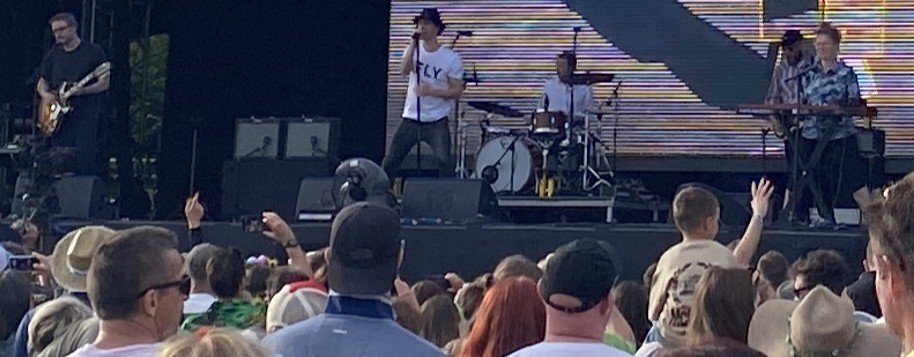
- Maxïmo Park performing in 2025. From left to right: Duncan Lloyd (guitar), Paul Smith (vocals), Tom English (drums), Andrew Lowther (bass), and Jemma Freese (keyboards)

Background information
- Origin: Newcastle, Tyne and Wear, England
- Genres: Indie rock; post-punk revival; alternative rock; electronic rock
- Years active: 2000–present
- Labels: V2, Beat, Warp, Hostees, Cooking Vinyl, A Remarkable Idea
- Members: Paul Smith; Duncan Lloyd; Tom English
- Past members: Archis Tiku; Lukas Wooller
- Website: maximopark.com

Maxïmo Park are an English alternative rock band formed in 2000 in Newcastle upon Tyne. The band currently consists of Paul Smith (lead vocals), Duncan Lloyd (guitar, bass, keyboards, backing vocals), and Tom English (drums). The band have released eight studio albums: A Certain Trigger (2005), Our Earthly Pleasures (2007), Quicken the Heart (2009), The National Health (2012), Too Much Information (2014), Risk to Exist (2017), Nature Always Wins (2021), and Stream of Life (2024). The first two albums went gold in the UK, and their debut was nominated for the Mercury Prize.

== History ==
=== Formation and early releases (2000–2003) ===
The band was created by guitarist Duncan Lloyd and is named after Máximo Gómez Park (also known as Domino Park), located in Little Havana, Miami. Initially, the four founding members played several small shows including Manchester's In the City, which showcases unsigned bands in the UK. In 2003, the band decided they wanted a frontman as the original singers, Archis and Duncan, wanted to focus on writing the songs. The then-girlfriend of the drummer Tom English noticed his friend Paul Smith singing along to Stevie Wonder's "Superstition". When Smith was found, the band did not know if he could sing: "When he first joined we didn't know if he could; just that he was a lunatic jumping around in a suit, it felt like the last piece of the jigsaw". With Smith joining the band gave him demos of their songs and from then on they started writing as a unit.

=== A Certain Trigger (2004–2005) ===
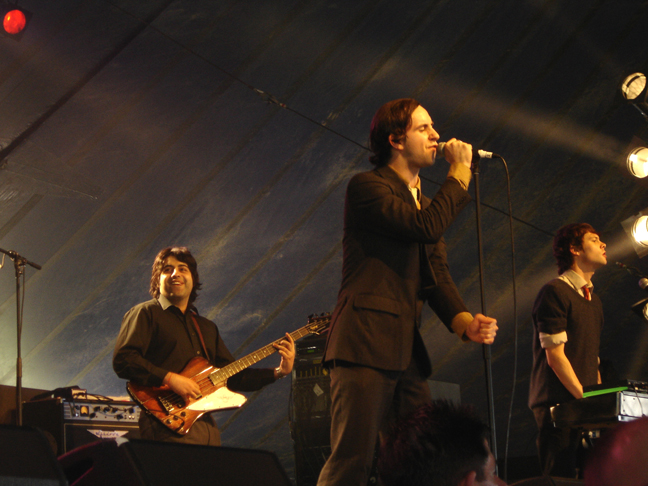
Maxïmo Park performing at BBC Radio 1's Big Weekend in 2005

Around March 2004, a friend funded 300 copies of a 7" red vinyl single ("Graffiti" / "Going Missing") which was recorded by Duncan Lloyd in his and Thomas English's flat in Fenham, Newcastle. The band's second release was a 7" single of their songs "The Coast Is Always Changing" and "The Night I Lost My Head", recorded by Paul Epworth. After some time of doing gigs around their home town, Steve Beckett of the dance-electronic label Warp Records acquired one of these records and decided to sign the band to his label after also seeing the band perform at the Notting Hill Arts Club hosted by Creation Records founder Alan McGee.

In 2005, Maxïmo Park released their debut album, A Certain Trigger, which sold over 300,000 copies and was nominated for the Mercury Prize in July 2005. In July, Maxïmo Park had the honour of being the first band to play the Ibiza Rocks festival on its opening event. In December 2006, the band were brought to Shanghai by Split Works and were one of the earlier big-name acts from abroad to play in China.

=== Our Earthly Pleasures (2006–2007) ===
In August 2006, the band announced that they had started work on their next album, which was produced by Gil Norton and recorded at Rak Studios in St John's Wood in London. On 22 January 2007, the band announced that their second album, Our Earthly Pleasures, would be released on 2 April 2007 and on 8 May 2007 in the US, preceded by the album's lead single, "Our Velocity", on 19 March 2007. On 30 January 2007, the band released details of a tour to promote Our Earthly Pleasures, the tickets of which sold out within minutes of their release on 2 February 2007. Later that same April, frontman Paul Smith contributed vocals to a pop soul remix of the band's 2005 single "Apply Some Pressure" by English DJ and producer Mark Ronson for his studio album of cover versions, Version, as an album-only track, Smith having recorded the vocals for Ronson after Ronson invited him to perform on the instrumental he had made based on the band's original. In October 2007, the band contributed a cover of Justin Timberlake and Clipse's "Like I Love You" for the compilation album Radio 1: Established 1967, the album consisting of cover versions recorded for BBC Radio 1 for the station's fourtieth anniversary. This cover would also appear on the CD single for "Karaoke Plays" in December of that same year.

=== Quicken the Heart (2008–2010) ===
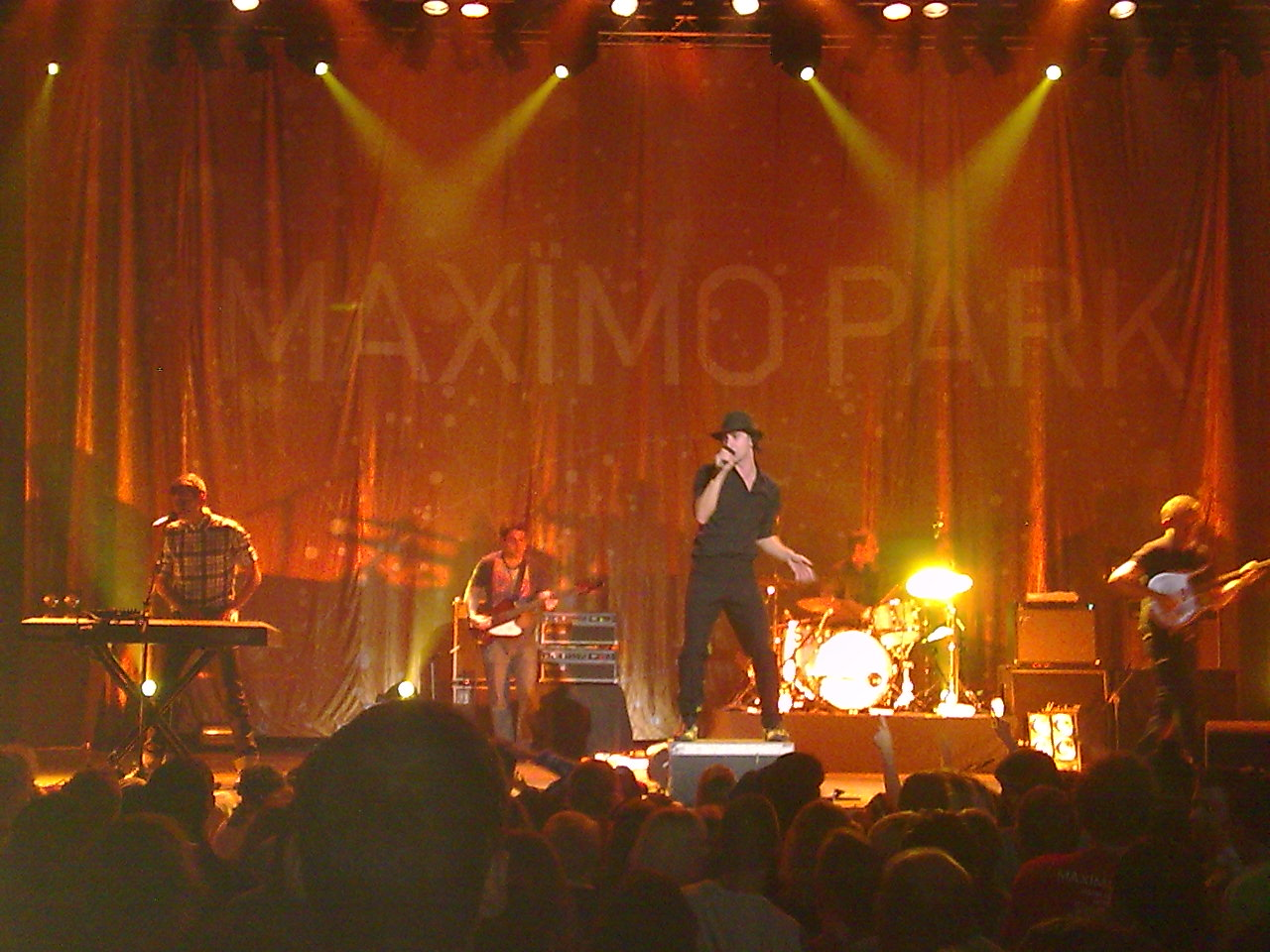
Maxïmo Park performing in Tilburg in 2009

In October 2008, the band announced that they had started recording their third album in Los Angeles with the producer Nick Launay, known for his recent work with Nick Cave and Grinderman. The full track list of the album was announced on 11 March 2009. Quicken the Heart was released on 11 May, with the first single, "The Kids Are Sick Again" being released a week earlier. Tickets for a tour taking place in May 2009 sold out in record time. In 2010, they performed a new song called "Banlieue", which ended up on their next album, The National Health. Their 2011 tour also had "Banlieue" in the set list, as well as another song which was to be on The National Health, "Waves of Fear".

=== The National Health (2011–2012) ===
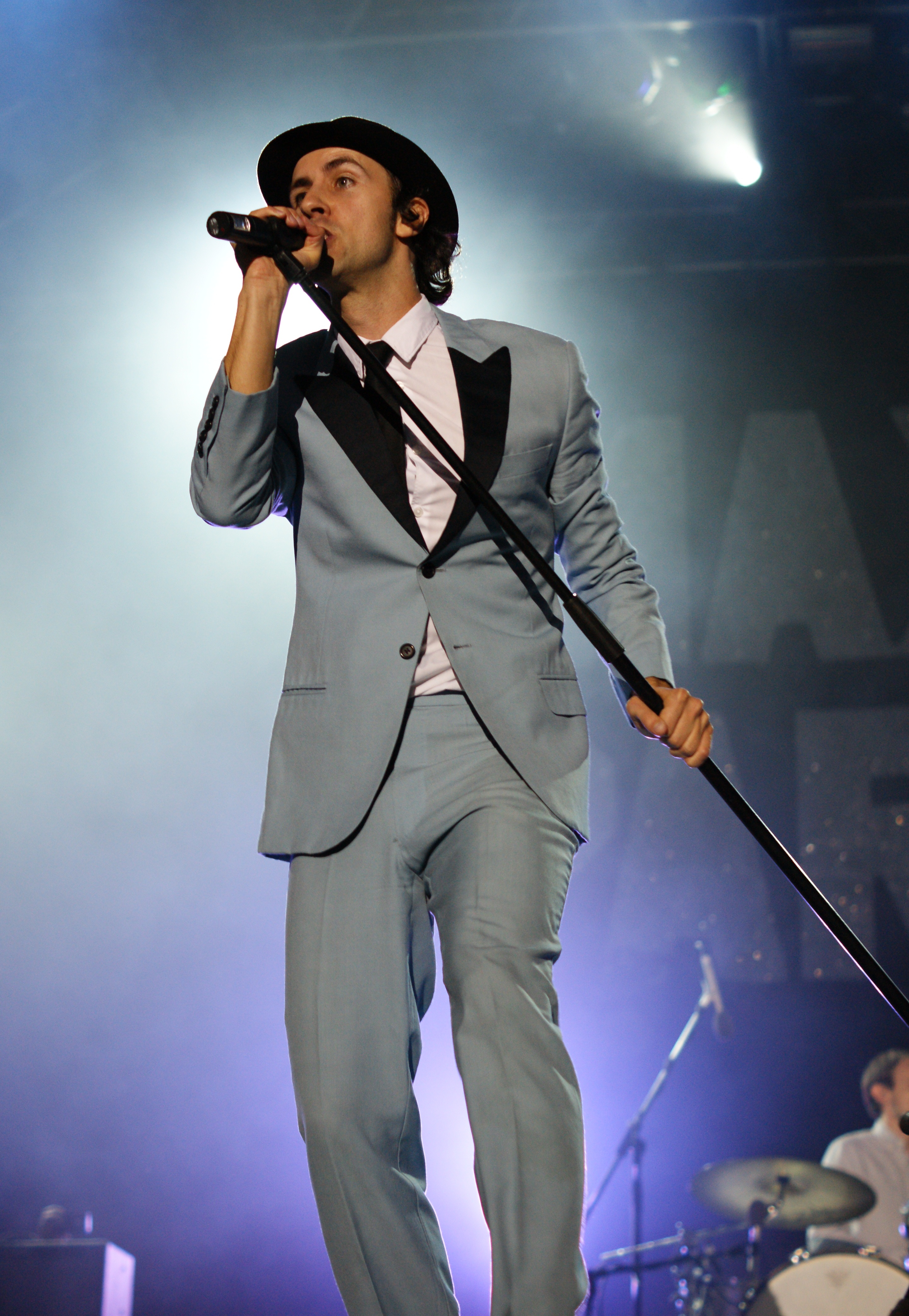
Frontman Paul Smith and drummer Tom English performing with the band at Bingley Music Live in 2011

On 28 March 2012, Maxïmo Park announced the fourth album title as The National Health. Smith said, "We're in a global recession and everyone is being bombarded with bouncy, happy music. The nation is out of control and the record is about taking back control, and being a force for change in your own life. It can't speak for everybody but it has its eyes and ears all around us… that's always been a Maxïmo Park thing: look at yourself." The album was released on 11 June 2012.

In September 2012, it was announced that the bass guitarist Archis Tiku would be taking time away from touring, to be covered by Paul Rafferty of Hot Club de Paris.

=== Too Much Information (2013–2014) ===
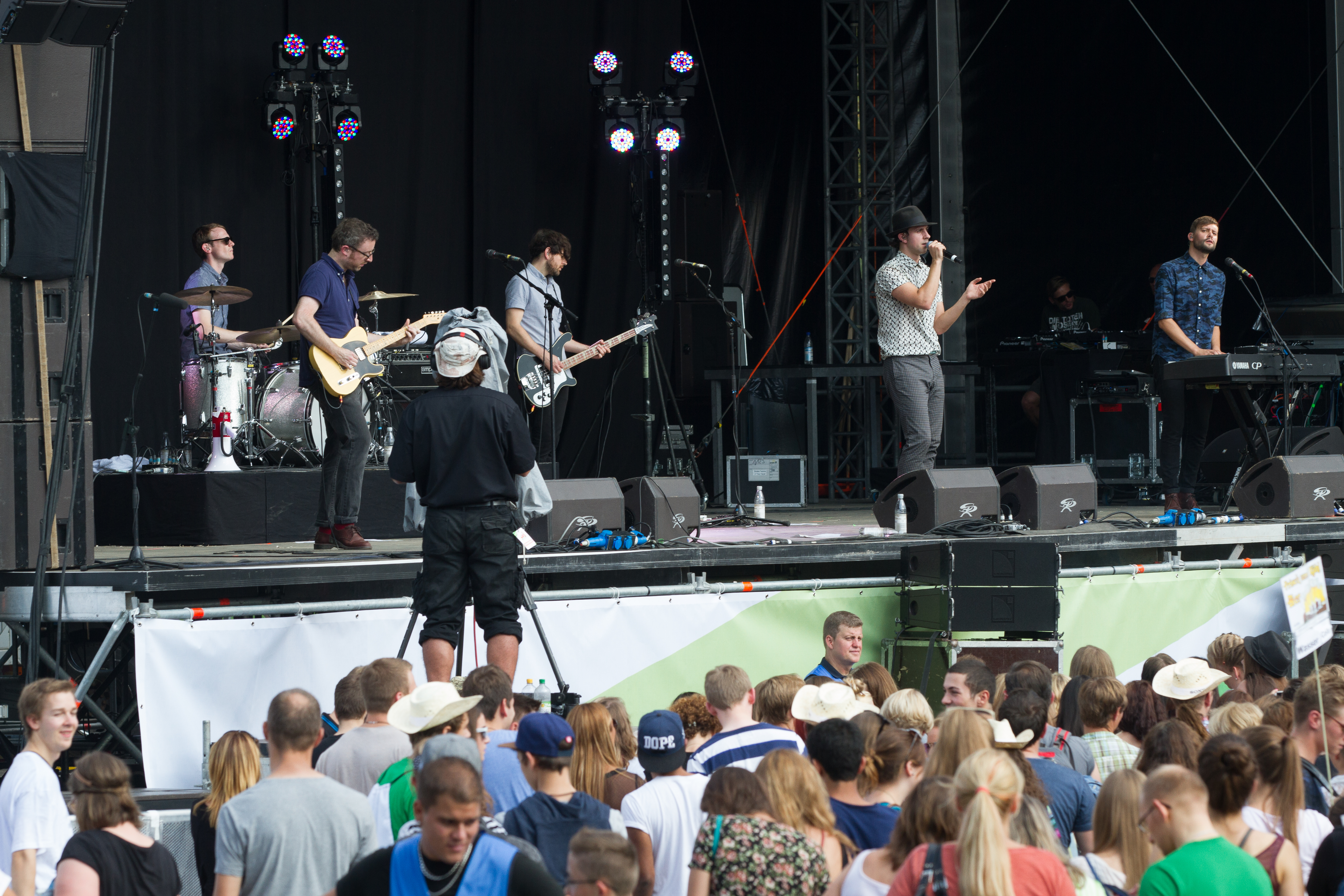
Maxïmo Park performing in September 2014. L–R: English, Lloyd, Smith, Wooller, Rafferty

On 15 November 2013, Maxïmo Park announced the forthcoming release of their fifth album. Titled Too Much Information, the album was released on 3 February 2014. Of the album, Smith said, "Our lyrics and our music will never be too-cool-for-school - we are an emotional band even if it might be too much information for some." The album was recorded by Duncan Lloyd and produced by the band, with additional production by The Invisible's Dave Okumu on the track Brain Cells. Recording originally started as an EP of 5 tracks in Sunderland, with help from Field Music's David and Peter Brewis, before turning into a fully formed album with the extra tracks recorded in the band's studio in Newcastle.

=== Risk to Exist and Tiku and Wooller's departures (2016–2019) ===
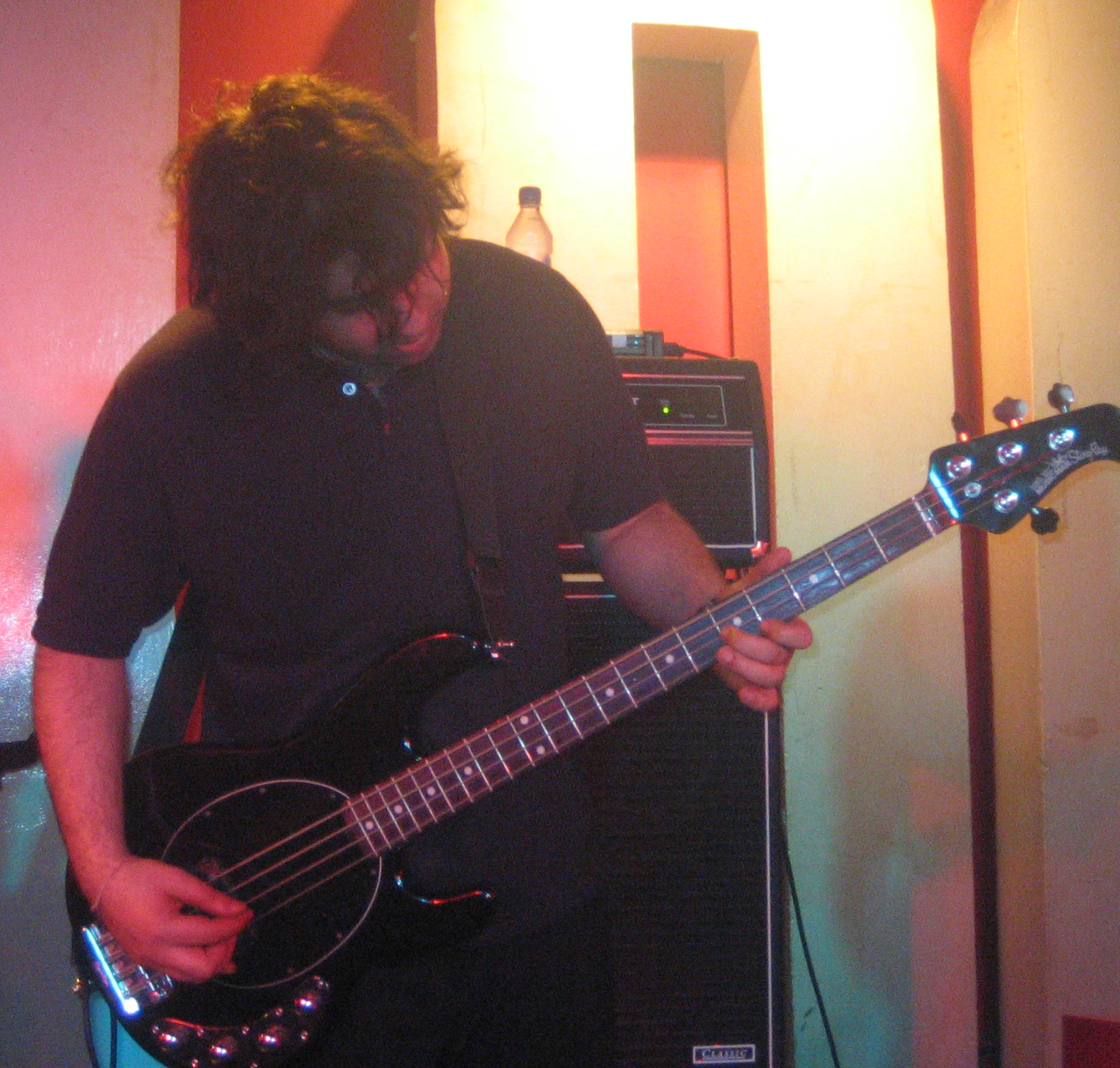
Original bassist Archis Tiku (pictured performing with the band in 2007) left the band in 2017, having retired from touring in 2009.

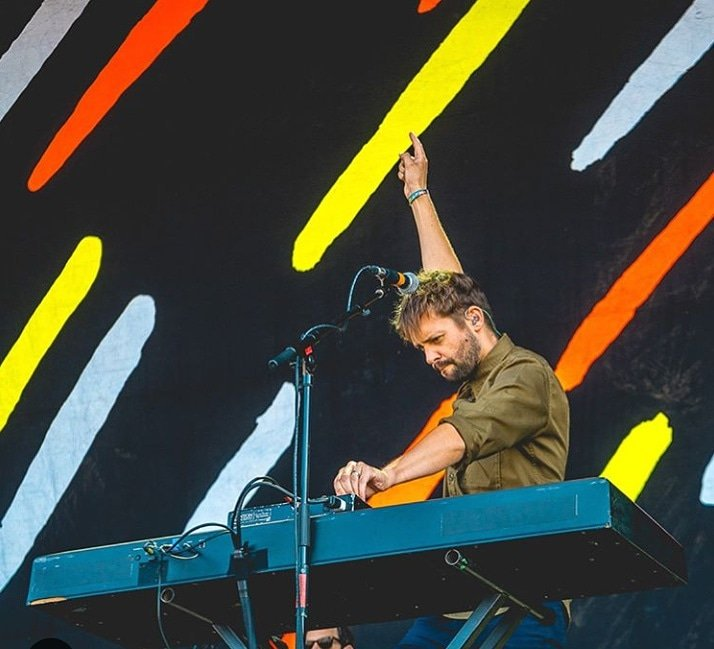
Original keyboardist and one of the band's early frontmen Lukas Wooller (pictured performing with the band in 2017) left the band in 2019 to move to Australia and start a family there.

On 20 January 2017, Maxïmo Park announced their sixth album Risk to Exist via their website, following the debut of the title track and first single the night before on BBC 6 Music's Steve Lamacq Show. The band confirmed via Twitter that bassist Archis Tiku, who had not performed with the band live since the end of the Quicken the Heart tour, had officially retired. His live replacement, Paul Rafferty, was confirmed to be the session bassist on Risk to Exist, although he is not an official member of the band.

In November 2018, keyboardist Lukas Wooller announced his imminent departure from the band in order to emigrate to Australia and start a family there. His final show took place on 10 January 2019 at Leeds Beckett University. He was replaced by touring keyboardist Jemma Freese, converting the official line-up of the band into a trio.

Shortly after Wooller's departure, the band released a new live studio session as a CD/DVD package, entitled As Long As We Keep Moving.

=== Nature Always Wins and Stream of Life (2020–present) ===
In September 2020, the band shared a new single, "Child of the Flatlands." A month later, the band released "Baby, Sleep" and announced their seventh album, Nature Always Wins. On 27 November 2020 the band released the album's third single, "I Don't Know What I'm Doing." The album was released worldwide on 26 February 2021, and was expected to become their first number one album in the United Kingdom after debuting in that position in the midweek chart. However, when the chart was announced on 5 March 2021, the band had debuted at number two on the UK Albums Chart, with 549 sales separating them from the number-one album that week: Architects' For Those That Wish to Exist.

The band released their eighth studio album, Stream of Life, in September 2024. Four singles were released in the lead-up: "Favourite Songs", "Your Own Worst Enemy", "The End Can Be As Good As The Start" and "Quiz Show Clue".

== Other contributions ==
In 2007, the band contributed their song "Wasteland" to Help!: A Day in the Life.

In 2009, they contributed a cover version of a Vincent Gallo song to the Warp20 (Recreated) compilation, as well as having their own song "Acrobat" covered by Seefeel.

== Band members ==
=== Current members ===
- Tom English – drums (2000–present)
- Duncan Lloyd – guitar (2000–present), backing vocals (2003–present), keyboards, piano (2019–present; in studio), bass (2020–present; in studio), lead vocals (2000–2003)
- Paul Smith – lead vocals (2003–present)

=== Current touring musicians ===
- Jemma Freese – keyboards, piano, backing vocals (2019–present)
- Andrew Lowther – bass guitar (2021, 2022–present)

=== Former members ===
- Archis Tiku – bass guitar (2000–2014), lead vocals (2000–2003)
- Lukas Wooller – keyboards, piano, backing vocals (2000–2019)
- Paul Rafferty – bass guitar (2012–2020; session/touring musician)
- Katy Trigger – bass guitar (2021; touring musician)

== Discography ==
Studio albums

- A Certain Trigger (2005)
- Our Earthly Pleasures (2007)
- Quicken the Heart (2009)
- The National Health (2012)
- Too Much Information (2014)
- Risk to Exist (2017)
- Nature Always Wins (2021)
- Stream of Life (2024)
