= Paul Smith (English singer) =

British musician (born 1979)

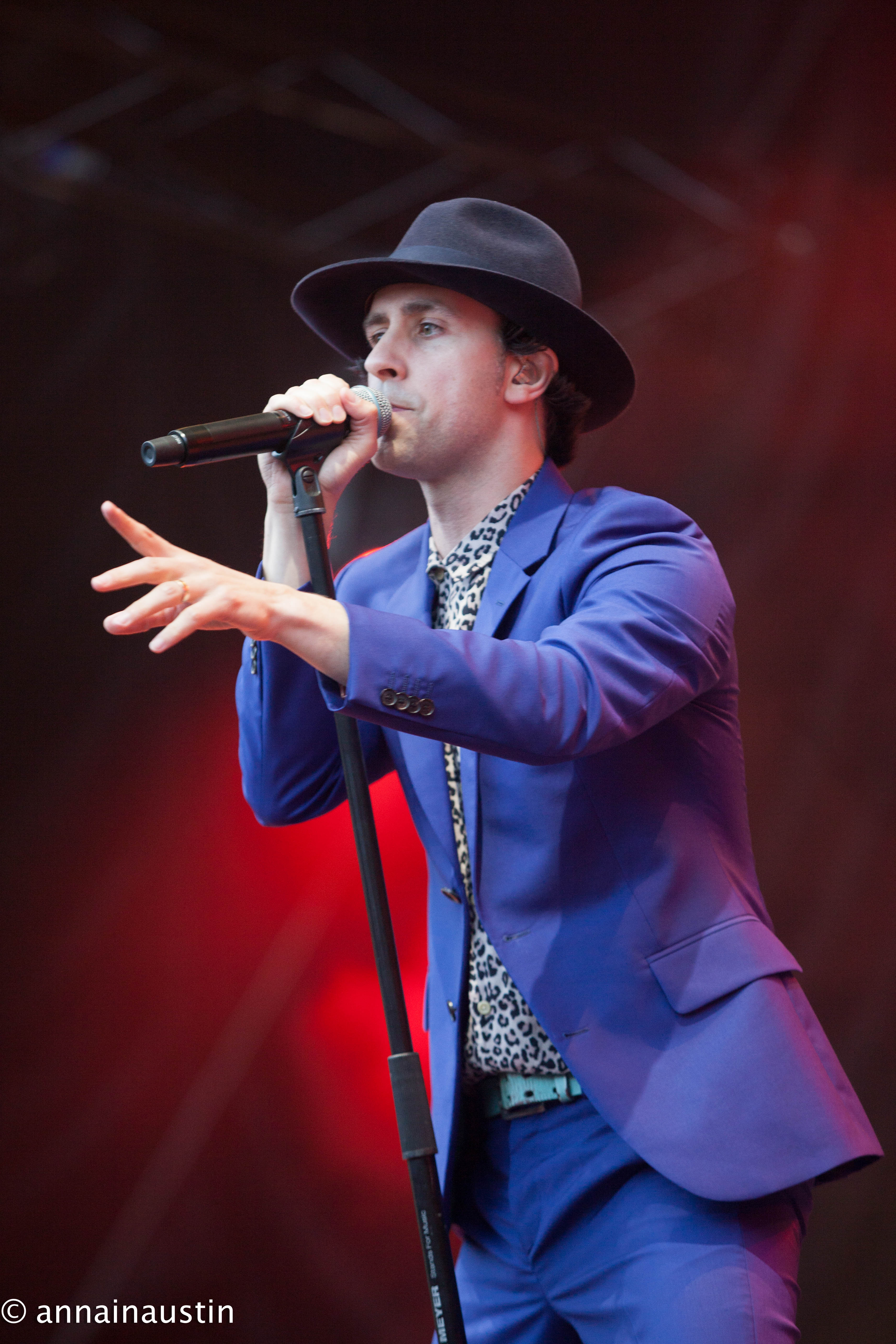
- Smith performing with Maxïmo Park in Latvia in 2017

Background information
- Born: Paul Smith; 13 March 1979 (age 47); Billingham, Stockton-on-Tees, England
- Genres: Indie rock, art rock
- Occupations: Vocalist, songwriter
- Instruments: Vocals, guitar
- Years active: 2003–present

Paul Smith (born 13 March 1979) is an English singer and songwriter. He is best known as the lead singer of indie rock band Maxïmo Park. He has also released solo albums and, in 2023 as Unthank: Smith, an album with Rachel Unthank which received a four-starred review from Jude Rogers in The Guardian.

== Biography ==
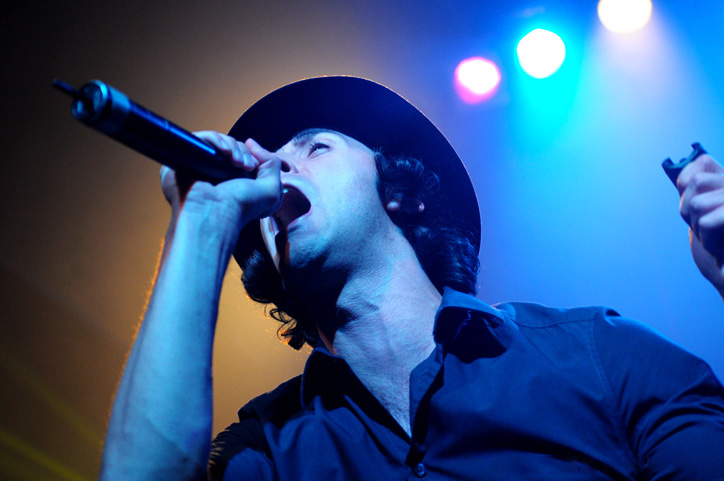
Smith performing in November 2009

Born in Billingham, Stockton-on-Tees, Smith is the eldest of three children, and was educated at Northfield School. He attended Newcastle University completing a BA and MA, studying Art History and English Linguistics, following a one-year Foundation Studies course at Cleveland College of Art and Design in Hartlepool. He briefly worked as an art teacher at Stockton Riverside College, before the then-girlfriend of Maxïmo Park drummer Tom English noticed Smith singing along to Stevie Wonder's "Superstition", where he was asked to join the band, active for three years by that point, taking over on vocals from guitarist Duncan Lloyd and then-bassist Archis Tiku, both of whom co-fronted the band in its infancy, with the latter two, by that point, wanting the focus on writing the band's songs instead.

In April 2007, Smith contributed vocals to a pop soul remix of Maxïmo Park's 2005 single "Apply Some Pressure" by DJ and producer Mark Ronson for his studio album of cover versions, Version. Smith recorded the vocals for Ronson after Ronson invited him to perform on the instrumental he had made based on the band's original.

In 2014 Smith teamed up with Field Music singer Peter Brewis to record an album, Frozen by Sight, derived from his travel writing, and featuring string arrangements by Brewis.

In 2015 he released Contradictions, a solo album, as Paul Smith and the Intimations, and in 2018, released a fourth solo album, Diagrams.

In February 2023 Smith released an album with Rachel Unthank of folk band The Unthanks. Reviewing the album for KLOF Magazine, Hannah Webber described Unthank: Smith’s Nowhere and Everywhere as "a triumph, an amalgamation of musical style and defiance of genre, one that celebrates and commemorates the experiences of ordinary people". It received a four-starred review from Jude Rogers in The Guardian.

== Artistry ==
Smith grew up idolising Morrissey and has been compared by critics to the Smiths' former frontman and to Jarvis Cocker for his introspective lyrics and on-stage hyperactivity.

== Personal life ==
He is a fan of Middlesbrough F.C.

== Discography ==
=== Maxïmo Park ===
- A Certain Trigger (2005)
- Missing Songs (2005)
- Our Earthly Pleasures (2007)
- Quicken the Heart (2009)
- The National Health (2012)
- Too Much Information (2014)
- Risk to Exist (2017)
- As Long As We Keep Moving (2019)
- Nature Always Wins (2021)
- Stream of Life (2024)

=== Solo ===
- Margins (2010)
- Frozen By Sight (with Peter Brewis) (2014)
- Contradictions (as Paul Smith and The Intimations) (2015)
- Diagrams (2018)

=== With Rachel Unthank, as Unthank: Smith ===
- Nowhere and Everywhere (2023)
