= Duncan Lloyd =

English musician

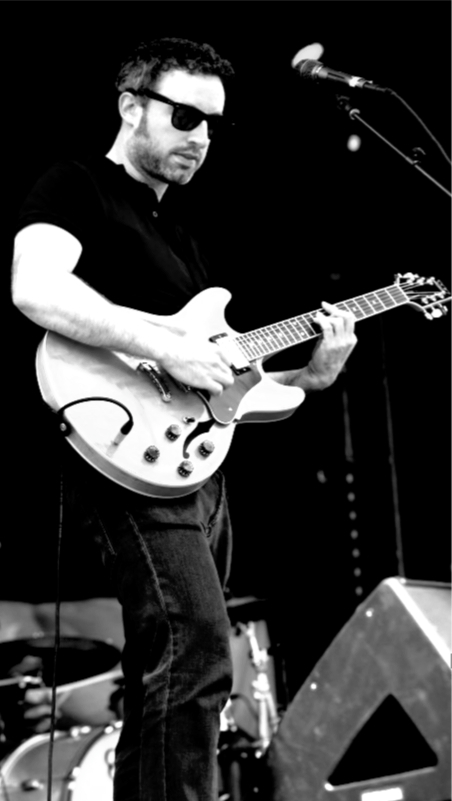
- Lloyd performing in 2014

Background information
- Born: Duncan Lloyd
- Origin: Derby, England
- Genres: Alternative rock; lo-fi; underground rock; electronic
- Instruments: Vocals, guitar
- Years active: 2000–present
- Member of: Maxïmo Park, Res Band, Nano Kino

Duncan Lloyd is an English singer-songwriter and guitarist.

He is the lead songwriter and backing vocalist for Maxïmo Park. He also works as a solo artist releasing albums on Warp Records (U.K.), Crash Symbols (U.S.) and is currently on Reveal Records. Working under his stage name Decade in Exile as well as his own name, he is also in experimental band Res Band from Derby and alternative rock band Nano Kino.

Alongside songwriting Lloyd is an exhibiting painter and photographer.

== Biography ==
Lloyd also works in soundtrack composition. He has collaborated with composers Jon Boorman and Benson Taylor on music for film and television.

== Solo ==
In 2017 he released IOUOME on Afternoon in Bed Records his first album under his own name in 9 years. Lloyd collaborated with Nicole Yun of US band Eternal Summers on the track Heart in Delay with Yun singing back up vocals. Lloyd has since contributed guitar appearing alongside Doug Gillard of Guided by Voices on Nicole Yun's debut album Paper Suit out June 2019.

Still writing and recording independently,Outside Notion, his third album, was announced for release on 24 May 2019. Described in the press release as "a definite lean away from the indie rock he is known for. Orchestrated segments circle around telling insights, executed with a depth of tender maturity, his most adventurous & soulful record."

In 2021 Lloyd joined Reveal Records for his output as an independent artist following the discovery of his work on bandcamp by label founder, Tom Rose. His first release on Reveal Records is from the 2021 label artists compilation, "Have You Heard?" with a song called, "A Chime". Reveal Records announced the signing on their Instagram page, "Reveal are delighted to welcome English songwriter Duncan Lloyd to the roster for his solo music. More new music and catalogue reissues from @dunclloyd later in 2021".

== Decade in Exile ==
On 6 May 2014, still under the name, 'Decade in Exile', Lloyd released the album 'Transit / Pulse' through the label 'Crash Symbols' based in Morgantown, West Virginia. The cassette consists of highly experimental instrumentals composed in reaction to the loss of Lloyd's father. Crash Symbols describe the release; "Somber guitar, loops, and a heavily textured backdrop give some songs the character of ragas, particularly on shorter tracks. It is largely Lloyd's periodic singing that amounts to the album's only distinct signal for the shift from meditation to consciousness. These tracks are beautiful and willful, and among Lloyd's most varied creations to date."

== Nano Kino ==
In 2015, Lloyd founded Nano Kino with singer Sarah Suri. Bonding over a mutual love of early 4AD and Broadcast. Surfing on the Void (released 2016) is their debut 4 track EP. They are currently working on their new releases.

== Personal life ==
Born in Derby, Duncan is of Irish, English and Welsh heritage. Lloyd is an alumnus of Northumbria University, having graduated with a degree in Fine Art.

He studied sound engineering at Confetti Studios in Nottingham.

== Discography ==
Duncan Lloyd

Studio albums

- Seeing Double (2008)
- IOUOME (2017)
- Outside Notion (2019)
- Transit / Pulse - Remastered(2021)
- Unwound (2025)

EPs

- Decade in Exile (2011)
- Icelander (2015)
- Freak Facade (2016)
- Dear O (2019)
- Bright Bridges (2020)
- Decade in Exile - Expanded Remaster (2021)
- Cry Wolf, Cry (2024)
- Sleep Off A Bad Year (2024)
- Boundaries (2024)

Compilations

- Green Grows Devotion - Selected Works (2022)
- Fun City - 3 EPs (2024)

with Maxïmo Park

As Decade in Exile

Studio albums

- Transit / Pulse (2014)

EPs

- Untitled (Decade in Exile release) (2011)
- Xola / Instrumentals (2012)
- Trail Places (2013)
