= Soft Effects =

Soft Effects EP

EP by Spoon
- Released: 1997 (Matador Records); 2006 (Merge Records)
- Recorded: August–September 1996
- Studio: Dog Land; Mountain To Sound
- Genre: Indie rock
- Length: 14:49
- Label: Merge Records
- Producer: John Croslin

Spoon chronology
Telephono (1996)	Soft Effects EP (1997)	A Series of Sneaks (1998)

Soft Effects is the second EP by the indie rock band Spoon. It was released on January 21, 1997, by Matador. It was then re-released on CD with Telephono in 2006 by Merge Records. In 2020, it was reissued on vinyl.

== Background and recording ==
In a 2020 interview promoting the vinyl reissue, Britt Daniel said that the songs on Soft Effects were originally intended to be b-sides for a single from Telephono. After recording four of the five songs, the people from Matador convinced Spoon to use them for an EP instead, since Telephono hadn't performed well. Daniel adds that, "the gist of it was all of the songs were going to be recorded very much like, you know, 'this is just going to be a b-side, no one's going to hear it'. And it ended up [being] definitely one of the best things we'd done, and still one of my favorite records."

Daniel picked "Mountain to Sound" as one of Spoon's career defining songs in a 2014 article with The Guardian. He said, "I think this one sums up the best of early Spoon songs. It’s loud and brash and has a lot of really heavy rhythm guitar, which is something we moved away from after the first or second record." He added that the band were more focused on going over well with bar audiences during this period, saying "the old records sound like a different band, and it was. I was in a different place, and we were writing songs for different reasons at that point."

In another 2014 interview with Pitchfork, Daniel reflected on the recording process, commenting that "when we made Telephono and Soft Effects, pre-production basically involved recording rehearsals on cassette." However, he noted that the band had never played "Mountain to Sound" together prior to the day they recorded it. He additionally claimed that the band thought keyboards were "uncool" at this time, and so they used guitar delay pedal effects on the song "I Could See the Dude", instead of keyboards.

== Artwork ==
The original 1997 CD release of Soft Effects featured a shot of a blue sky over a desert landscape, while the 1997 vinyl artwork featured a black-and-white photo of a man and a woman. When reissued on CD in 2006, the blue sky artwork was used, while both covers would be used for the 2020 vinyl reissue.

== Reception ==
Professional ratings
Review scores
Source	Rating
AllMusic	4/5 stars
Pitchfork Media	7.5/10

The EP was not widely covered in the music press upon release in 1997, but garnered more coverage when reissued in 2006. In an undated review for AllMusic, Matthias Sheaks awarded it four out of five stars. He wrote, "each of the five songs on display here is a new reason to love this band, and just as importantly, each one is an almost completely different experience from the last". In his August 2006 review of the Telephono/Soft Effects reissue, Pitchfork's Brian Howe awarded the release a 7.5 out of 10. He wrote that, "thanks to Britt Daniel's vocal panache and durable songwriting, both albums hold up well."

PopMatters writer Jennifer Kelly gave the reissue an 8 out of 10 in July 2006, saying that "Soft Effects represents a giant step forward and a much fuller realization of the band’s sound. Now, you can hear all the elements that define later Spoon, the jangling stop-start guitars, the upright, new-wavish four-four strut, the smoky croon and sudden yelp of Daniel’s voice." Audra Schroeder of The Austin Chronicle gave the reissue three out of five stars in August 2006. She said that Soft Effects felt too short, but noted "[it] also points the direction of Spoon to come – anthemic, riffy, elegant. Ominous opener 'Mountain to Sound' sounds fantastic, fading into 'Waiting for the Kid to Come Out.' 'Get Out the State' descends into beautiful guitar squall, and all five songs point to the pop promise of 2001's Girls Can Tell." Mike Powell of Stylus Magazine wrote in July 2006 that "the reissuing of their first two Matador releases, 1996’s Telephono and 1997’s Soft Effects EP is probably the most formal pampering [Spoon have] had yet." He went on to claim Telephono hadn't aged well, but said that "the 15 minutes of Soft Effects make it easy to forget Telephono entirely."

== Track listing ==
All songs written by Britt Daniel.

1. "Mountain to Sound" – 3:50
2. "Waiting for the Kid to Come Out" – 2:40
3. "I Could See the Dude" – 1:59
4. "Get Out the State" – 2:50
5. "Loss Leaders" – 3:30

== Personnel ==
Spoon

- Britt Daniel – vocals, guitar
- Jim Eno – drums

Additional musicians

- Scott Adair – bass guitar
- John Croslin – bass guitar
- Brad Shenfeld - dabouke

Production

- John Croslin – production, engineering
- Spoon – design
- Travis Higdon – design
- Frank Longo – design
- Mark Ohe – design
