= 30 Gallon Tank =

EP by Spoon
- Released: May 5, 1998
- Genre: Indie rock
- Length: 10:27
- Label: Elektra
- Producer: Spoon; John Croslin

Spoon chronology
A Series of Sneaks (1998)	30 Gallon Tank (1998)	Love Ways (2000)

30 Gallon Tank is the third EP by the indie rock band Spoon. The 7" record was released on May 5, 1998, as a promotional EP showcasing the band which was newly signed to Elektra Records. The A-side of 30 Gallon Tank contained two tracks that also appeared on A Series of Sneaks, while the B-side contained a new Spoon song and a previously released Drake Tungsten track.

== Track listing ==
All tracks are written by Britt Daniel, except where noted.

No.	Title	Length
1.	"30 Gallon Tank" (Daniel, Jim Eno)	4:02
2.	"Car Radio (Different)"	1:30
3.	"Revenge!"	2:47
4.	"I Could Be Underground"	2:08
Total length:		10:27

=== Notes ===
- The title track "30 Gallon Tank" was also released on A Series of Sneaks.
- The song "Car Radio (Different)" is a remix of the similarly named track that appears on A Series of Sneaks.
- "Revenge!" is a never-before released Spoon track.
- "I Could Be Underground" is originally a Drake Tungsten song, with slightly different versions appearing on Clocking Out Is For Suckers and Six Pence for the Sauces.

== Personnel ==
Spoon

- Britt Daniel – vocals, guitar
- Joshua Zarbo – bass guitar
- Jim Eno – drums

Additional personnel

- Davis Comeau – cello on "I Could Be Underground"
- John Croslin – production (all except "Car Radio (Different)")
- Spoon – production
