= Everything Hits at Once =

2001 single by Spoon

Single by Spoon

from the album Girls Can Tell
- B-side: "The Agony of Laffitte"; "Lines in the Suit" (30 Minutes Old); "Everything Hits at Once" (for Discos)
- Released: September 10, 2001
- Recorded: 2000
- Studio: Jim Eno's home studio in Austin, Texas
- Genre: Indie rock
- Length: 4:04
- Label: Merge
- Songwriter(s): Britt Daniel
- Producer(s): Britt Daniel; Jim Eno; Mike McCarthy

Spoon singles chronology
"Anything You Want" (2001)	"Everything Hits at Once" (2001)	"Car Radio" (2001)

Music video
- "Everything Hits at Once" on YouTube

"Everything Hits at Once" is a song by American indie rock band Spoon, the first track on their fourth studio album, Girls Can Tell (2001). It was released as the second single from the album on September 10, 2001. The song was intended to be stylistically distinct from the band's past material, incorporating influences from Fleetwood Mac and Elvis Costello and including a mellotron solo. "Everything Hits at Once" has since seen critical acclaim for its arrangement and composition. It was later included on Spoon's greatest hits album Everything Hits at Once (2019), which is named after the song.

== Background ==
Like many of the other songs on Girls Can Tell, "Everything Hits at Once" was intended as a departure from the punkish style the band had previously employed. Spoon frontman Britt Daniel commented on this, "[The song] was a turning point of a song for us. I don't think there's a song that we could have come up with that would have been as far away from [1998 LP] A Series of Sneaks as that one. I was proud of that, and that's why we jammed it on the front of that album. It was a sort of announcement -- we're able and we're excited to go different places."

Stylistically, the song takes influence from classic rock and new wave influences that the band had previously eschewed. Eleanor Friedberger, former Fiery Furnaces singer and Daniel's girlfriend, recalled listening to the song for the first time: "It's so radically different than anything he'd done before. Like he'd totally embraced Fleetwood Mac. I remember Britt listening to Tusk over and over again, and when I heard that, it was like, 'OK, it has sunk in completely—it's working.'" The song has also been compared to Elvis Costello's work.

The song also features a mellotron solo section, performed by Daniel's friend Conrad Keely of ...And You Will Know Us by the Trail of Dead. Daniel explained the band's thought process:

"I remember when we came up with the solo section for "Everything Hits at Once," it felt like, 'For us, that's a thing—we're actually going to do a solo here?' That's pretty trad. But then again, I was into going to trad places. I remember not knowing how to write a solo, then figuring out, 'This song is in F-sharp minor—here are the notes to that chord.' I labeled the notes on the keyboard so I could come up with a melody. I'm not Jon Brion, you know? I could barely play keys to begin with. And I remember feeling before then that piano was not cool. There was no way it was going to make an appearance on a Spoon record, and if we were going to use it at all, it was going to be something textural. It was all part of that Supremes revival I was feeling."

== Release ==
"Everything Hits at Once" was a late addition to Girls Can Tell, having been added in the second working version of the album produced with Mike McCarthy. "Everything Hits at Once" was released as the second single from Girls Can Tell on September 10, 2001, featuring the band's previous single "The Agony of Laffitte" and alternate versions of "Everything Hits at Once" and "Lines in the Suit" as B-sides. The single did not chart.

"Everything Hits at Once" also appeared as the title track on the band's 2019 compilation album, Everything Hits at Once: The Best of Spoon. Of the song's inclusion, Daniel elaborated, "It felt like something from Girls Can Tell needed to be on the hits record because it was such an important turning point for us in a lot of ways and this is maybe the most sort of single-like one."

== Reception ==
Billboard named the song number 95 on their top 100 singles of 2001; for the song's entry, Andrew Unterberger commented, "One of the 20th century's most consistent bands at writing punchy, smart pop-rock blasts, nothing from Spoon's last two decades have been quite as much of a fist to the gut as Girls Can Tell lead single 'Everything Hits at Once.'" Heather Phares of AllMusic said of the song, "Britt Daniel's increasingly eclectic and expansive songwriting comes to the forefront on 'Everything Hits at Once,' a taut, brooding pop song driven by vibes, keyboards, yearning, and pride."

== Track listing ==
No.	Title	Length
1.	"Everything Hits at Once"	4:05
2.	"The Agony of Laffitte"	3:38
3.	"Lines in the Suit" (30 Minutes Old)	2:19
4.	"Everything Hits at Once" (For Discos)	3:52

== Personnel ==
Personnel adapted from Girls Can Tell liner notes.

Spoon

- Britt Daniel – vocals, electric guitar
- Jim Eno – drums
- Josh Zarbo – bass guitar

Additional musicians

- Conrad Keely – Mellotron
- Laura Phelan – vibraphone

Technical personnel

- Britt Daniel – producer
- Jim Eno – producer, engineer
- John Golden – mastering engineer
- Mike McCarthy – producer, engineer
