= Clocking Out Is for Suckers =

Studio album by Drake Tungsten
- Released: 1994
- Recorded: 1991–1994
- Genre: Indie rock
- Length: 32:49
- Label: Self-released
- Producer: Britt Daniel

Drake Tungsten chronology
Clocking Out Is for Suckers (1994)	Six Pence for the Sauces (1996)

Clocking Out Is for Suckers is Drake Tungsten's first album, released in 1994 on cassette only and distributed to the Austin, Texas area. Many of the tracks were re-recorded and re-released on later Spoon albums.

== Track listing ==
1. "15 Credibility Street" - 2:49
2. "Chicago at Night" - 3:13
3. "Let Me Roll It!!" - 2:58
4. "All the Negatives Have Been Destroyed" - 2:43
5. "Interview 1" - 0:39
6. "Do The Manta Ray" - 2:04
7. "I Could Be Underground" - 1:03
8. "Taking My Piss Out" - 1:38
9. "Yeah Oh Yeah Oh Yeah" - 1:07
10. "[untitled]" - 1:39
11. "Interview 2" - 1:27
12. "I Can't Believe That Kurt Cobain Is Dead" - 1:43
13. "Secrets" - 2:39
14. "Dismember" - 1:48
15. "I Wanted To Be Your Friend" - 1:51
16. "Call Me When You Come Home" - 0:40
17. "Are You Part Of The Movement?" - 2:48

=== Notes ===
- "Let Me Roll It" is a Paul McCartney and Wings cover from Band on the Run.
- "Interview 1" was between Britt and his little brother, who was 7 years old.
- "Do the Manta Ray" is an instrumental Pixies cover of "Dancing the Manta Ray", which appears as a b-side on the "Monkey Gone To Heaven" single.
- "Secrets" was originally written by The Cure.
- Different versions of "Chicago at Night" later appear on Six Pence for the Sauces and also on Spoon's third LP, Girls Can Tell.
- Different versions of "I Could Be Underground" later appear on Six Pence for the Sauces and on Spoon's 30 Gallon Tank EP.
- "All the Negatives Have Been Destroyed", "Dismember", and "I Wanted To Be Your Friend" all appear later on Spoon's Telephono.
