= Yours Conditionally =

Studio album by Tennis
- Released: March 10, 2017
- Genre: Indie pop; indie rock
- Length: 36:17
- Label: Mutually Detrimental

Tennis chronology
Ritual in Repeat (2014)	Yours Conditionally (2017)	We Can Die Happy (2017)

Tennis studio album chronology
Ritual in Repeat (2014)	Yours Conditionally (2017)	Swimmer (2020)

Singles from Yours Conditionally
- 1. "Ladies Don't Play Guitar" Released: August 4, 2016; 2. "In the Morning I'll Be Better" Released: December 2, 2016; 3. "Modern Woman" Released: January 27, 2017; 4. "My Emotions Are Blinding" Released: February 24, 2017

Yours Conditionally is the fourth studio album by the musical duo Tennis, released on their own label, Mutually Detrimental, on March 10, 2017.

== Background ==
As with their debut record, Cape Dory (2011), the majority of the album was written by Patrick Riley and Alaina Moore during a four-month sailing excursion from San Diego, California to Cabo San Lucas and in the Sea of Cortez.

== Critical reception ==
Professional ratings
Aggregate scores
Source	Rating
Metacritic	72/100
Review scores
Source	Rating
AllMusic	4.5/5 stars
The A.V. Club	C+
Exclaim!	7.0/10
Pitchfork	6.4/10
PopMatters	7/10 stars

Yours Conditionally was generally well-received upon its initial release. Tim Sendra of AllMusic gave the album four and a ½ stars out of five, calling the album "punchy and sharp, still influenced by classic pop/rock song structures and recognizable to fans of Buddy Holly or The Shirelles, but with some new elements mixed in," deeming it their "best record so far." PopMatters granted the album seven out of ten stars, noting: "Yours Conditionally makes no attempt to reinvent Tennis and suffers from the same flaws that have mired much of their music, namely a tendency toward pleasant predictability. While the album is largely content to reside in familiar, unchallenging territory, however, it is also a lean and well-crafted set of pop songs with more bite than it lets on. It remains a largely satisfying venture that adds nuance, definition, and depth to the band’s already well-established sound."

Canadian publication Exclaim! gave the album a positive review, comparing both the instrumentation and Moore's vocals to Carole King and Fleetwood Mac. Laura Browning of The A.V. Club published a middling review of the album, writing: "Even with some outstanding singles, the album as a whole finds the group somewhere between its comfort zone and a confident next step, with many of the songs bleeding forgettably into one another."

== Track listing ==
All tracks are written by Patrick Riley and Alaina Moore.

No.	Title	Length
1.	"In the Morning I'll Be Better"	3:33
2.	"My Emotions Are Blinding"	3:41
3.	"Fields of Blue"	3:28
4.	"Ladies Don't Play Guitar"	3:44
5.	"Matrimony"	3:20
6.	"Baby Don't Believe"	4:53
7.	"Please Don't Ruin This for Me"	2:45
8.	"10 Minutes 10 Years"	3:11
9.	"Modern Woman"	4:03
10.	"Island Music"	3:39
Total length:		36:17

== Personnel ==
- Alaina Moore – vocals, keys, guitar, percussion
- Patrick Riley – guitar, bass, keys, drums, percussion
- Steve Voss – drums, percussion

== Charts ==
Chart (2017)	Peak position
US Billboard 200	91
US Independent Albums (Billboard)	4
US Top Alternative Albums (Billboard)	9
US Top Rock Albums (Billboard)	15
