= Nefarious =

Nefarious may refer to:

== People ==
- Charles Lescewicz, bassist for the band Macabre, known as Nefarious
- X-Raided (born 1974), American rapper once credited under the pseudonym Nefarious

== Fictional characters ==
- Count Nefarious, a Toonstruck character
- Doctor Nefarious, a Ratchet and Clank character
- Doctor Nefarious Tropy, a Crash Bandicoot character

== Entertainment ==
- Nefarious (video game), a 2017 video game
- Nefarious: Merchant of Souls, a documentary film
- Nefarious (film), a 2023 horror film

== Music ==
- Nefarious (EP), an indie rock album
- "Nefarious" (song), a 1996 indie rock song
