= The Way We Get By (song) =

2002 song by Spoon

Single by Spoon

from the album Kill the Moonlight
- Released: 20 August 2002
- Genre: Indie rock
- Length: 2:42
- Label: 12XU
- Songwriter: Britt Daniel
- Producers: Mike McCarthy, Spoon

Spoon singles chronology
"Everything Hits at Once" (2001)	"The Way We Get By" (2002)	"I Turn My Camera On" (2005)

Music video
- "The Way We Get By" on YouTube

“The Way We Get By” is a song by the American indie rock band Spoon, released in 2002 on the group's fourth studio album, Kill the Moonlight. Although it did not chart, the track became one of the band's most recognizable songs and gained wider attention through its use in television and later compilation releases.

== Background and writing ==
“The Way We Get By” was written by Britt Daniel during the sessions for Kill the Moonlight. Daniel has stated that the chorus emerged spontaneously early in the writing process, later forming the basis for the completed track. The lyrics reference several works by Iggy Pop and The Stooges, reflecting Daniel's interest in 1970s punk and proto‑punk influences. The band intentionally scaled back its sound during this period, favoring minimal arrangements and rhythmic focus over dense production. “The Way We Get By” emerged from this approach, built around a repetitive guitar riff, spare percussion, and clipped vocal delivery.

== Recording and production ==
The song was recorded in 2002 and produced by Mike McCarthy alongside the band. Credits associated with digital releases list Daniel and drummer Jim Eno as performers and mixing engineers. A music video directed by Steve Hanft was filmed in New York's Chinatown district during a tour. According to Daniel, a sequence involving a package handoff was removed after MTV determined it appeared too similar to a drug transaction.

== Composition and lyrics ==
“The Way We Get By” is a minimalist indie rock song built around piano, bass, and percussion. The lyrics describe a group of young people engaging in rebellious or escapist behavior as a means of coping with boredom or disaffection. The song includes explicit references to Iggy Pop and The Stooges, including “Shake Appeal,” “Some Weird Sin,” and “Down on the Street.”

== Reception and impact ==
Although the song did not chart, it became one of Spoon's most widely recognized tracks and has been cited as a fan favorite. While not released as a major commercial single in the traditional sense, it received significant airplay on alternative and college radio stations in the United States.

It gained additional visibility through placements in television series, most notably The O.C. Spin magazine put the song eighth on its top 50 songs of 2002. Notably, it appeared in the 2006 film Stranger than Fiction. The trailer for the film A Real Pain featured the song and was nominated for Best Sync Usage at the 2025 Libera Awards.

The track was later included on the band's 2019 compilation Everything Hits at Once: The Best of Spoon, underscoring its continued prominence in the group's catalog.
