= Six Pence for the Sauces =

EP by Drake Tungsten
- Released: 1996
- Genre: Indie rock
- Length: 11:44
- Label: Peek-A-Boo Records
- Producer: Britt Daniel

Drake Tungsten chronology
Clocking Out Is For Suckers (1994)	Six Pence for the Sauces (1996)	Upon Further Consideration (1998)

Six Pence for the Sauces was the second and last record released by Drake Tungsten. The five-song EP included two future Spoon tracks, as well as a Pixies cover. 1996 marked the end of Drake Tungsten, as well as the birth of Spoon - the musical group that Britt Daniel has performed with post-Tungsten.

== Track listing ==
1. "Do the Manta Ray" - 2:12
2. "Cool It You Need" - 3:52
3. "Chicago at Night" - 3:17
4. "He Was Soon To Undergo an Experience for which his Long Training as an Aristocrat, a Gentleman, and an Officer Had Scarcely Prepared Him" - 1:09
5. "I Could Be Underground" - 1:14

=== Notes ===
- "Do the Manta Ray" is an instrumental Pixies cover of "Dancing the Manta Ray", which appears as a B-side on the "Monkey Gone To Heaven" single.
- "Chicago at Night" was later re-recorded and re-released on Spoon's third LP, Girls Can Tell.
- "I Could Be Underground" was later re-recorded and re-released on Spoon's 30 Gallon Tank EP.
