= End of the Day =

End of the Day may refer to:

- End of the Day (The Reivers album), 1989
- End of the Day (Courtney Barnett album), 2023
- "End of the Day", a song by One Direction from their 2015 album Made in the A.M.
- "End of the Day", the English version of the song "Bella Traición" by Belinda
- The End of the Day (La Fin du jour), a 1939 French drama film
