= A Series of Sneaks =

Studio album by Spoon
- Released: April 28, 1998
- Recorded: 1997
- Studios: Dogland, Cedar Creek, Music Lane, The Hit Shack, Blue World, and The Catacomb in Austin, Texas
- Genres: Indie rock; art punk
- Length: 33:14
- Label: Elektra
- Producers: John Croslin; Spoon

Spoon chronology
Soft Effects (1997)	A Series of Sneaks (1998)	30 Gallon Tank (1998)

A Series of Sneaks is the second studio album by the indie band Spoon, released by Elektra Records in April 1998. Despite being overlooked critically and commercially upon its release, the album has since attained cult status.

== Production ==
After Matador Records released the Soft Effects EP in January 1997, Spoon began work on their second full-length album. The band had the option of releasing another album through the label, but by mid-1997 singer Britt Daniel was contemplating leaving Matador, as he felt the indie label viewed Spoon's sound as too commercial. In the fall of 1997, the band agreed to join the major label Elektra Records, officially signing in February 1998, after the new album had been completed. Josh Zarbo, who joined Spoon as bassist in 1997 during work on the album, later pointed out that nearly everything had been recorded prior to the late-1997 deal with Elektra, saying: "that record was pretty much made with Matador in the rearview mirror and Elektra not yet happening."

== Release ==
On its initial release in April 1998, the album did not sell as well as the Elektra had hoped, and by January 1999 it was already an out of print, deleted release. Regarding the record's lack of success, Britt Daniel remarked in 2019: "I remember we sold 1,200 copies [of Girls Can Tell] in the first week, which was almost as much as we had sold of all of A Series of Sneaks."

Spoon's relationship with Elektra was fraught from its beginnings. Though Elektra VP and A&R rep Ron Laffitte had pursued the band for over a year, they said he became less responsive even before they signed with the label in February 1998, a trend that continued through the release of the album. Britt Daniel described Laffitte as being like a different person before and after the band's signing. Laffitte was fired from Elektra not long after A Series of Sneaks came out, and Spoon was dropped from the label four months after its release. Angry with Laffitte, who had promised to stick with the band, Spoon recorded a vindictive, yet humorously-titled, two-song concept single entitled "The Agony of Laffitte", which was released by Saddle Creek Records in 1999. They lamented their experience with the music business executive and questioned his motivations with the songs "The Agony of Laffitte" and "Laffitte Don't Fail Me Now". When A Series of Sneaks was reissued by Merge Records in 2002, both songs from "The Agony of Laffitte" single were included as bonus tracks.

== Reception ==
Professional ratings
Review scores
Source	Rating
AllMusic	4/5 stars
The Austin Chronicle	4/5 stars
Music Story	3.5/5 stars
Pitchfork	9.4/10
Q	4/5 stars
The Rolling Stone Album Guide	3/5 stars
Stylus Magazine	A

A Series of Sneaks was positively received by critics upon its initial release. The songs were praised for their brevity, intelligent lyrics, and abundance of catchy hooks. Nick Mirov of Pitchfork called the album "one of the catchiest albums of the year".

Reviewing Merge's 2002 reissue of the album, David Peisner of Rolling Stone wrote that the album "hasn't lost any bite", and Michael Chamy of The Austin Chronicle called it one of the "great achievements of the late Nineties". Robert Christgau, on the other hand, said the album "doesn't qualify as the instant pleasure hypesters claim. It's too spiky and too cryptic. But it certainly earned its cult".

== Analysis ==
The music on the album has been compared to that of the Pixies, Wire, Pavement, Archers of Loaf, Gang of Four, Robert Pollard, and The Fall. Jonathan Druy of AllMusic called the band "guitar wizards who could package a variety of taut, terse, and inventive guitar sounds and unpredictable melodies into short, tight bursts one could still consider pop songs". Chris Morgan of Treble wrote that, despite "many of this album’s songs [being] two to three minutes or less, [with] some being ambient interludes between actual songs [...] Spoon reminds the listener that short does not necessarily mean incomplete or lazy", and "each song is a meticulous marriage of icy but melodic guitars, rigid bass and drums and Daniel’s assertive vocals." Mark Abraham of Cokemachineglow called the album "a concept-driven album that plays inertia and movement against one another as metaphors for individual growth, communal interaction, and persistence in the face of modernity", and said that "much of the beauty and tension comes from the incredibly interesting way Spoon plays with rhythm."

Daniel's lyricism has been described as "hallucinogenic" and "strangely wordy". Druy wrote in his review on AllMusic that, amidst the album's "sonic engagement, it is the search for meaning in music amidst the open roads and open spaces of the American Southwest that form a central character in Daniel's fragmented and oblique lyrical universe. In a few brief lines, a drive to New York on the interstate becomes a meditation on rock and youth in 'Car Radio,' while 'Metal School' seems to be a reassessment of the purpose of post-punk".

== Legacy ==
The album has been included in several lists of the best albums of the 1990s. Pitchfork ranked the album at #54 on their original "Top 100 Favorite Records of the 1990s" list, though it was later excluded from an updated version of the list. Magnet ranked it at #29 on their "Top 60 Albums, 1993-2003" list. Treble magazine ranked the album the 9th best of the decade.

In 2006, Mark Abraham of Cokemachineglow wrote that, while the album is not "some forgotten ur-masterpiece that would stand high amongst a forest including Loveless, OK Computer or Nevermind [...] Its roots, however, spread wide throughout the ground that bore those same trees, feeding off their energy and yielding a gem of an indie rock album." Chris Morgan of Treble wrote in 2007 that "It would be a bit hasty to say that A Series of Sneaks was ahead of its time, an achievement that is more daunting with every passing decade. Rather Spoon simply dusted off sounds of an era not yet fully appreciated by American audiences and it could be said that albums of this type were catalysts that made it possible for a band like Modest Mouse to become the next Green Day." Discussing the album in relation to the rest of the band's discography, in 2010 Bryan Sanchez of Delusions of Adequacy called the album a "game-changer that’s always overlooked because it’s not from this decade, because it’s rough around the edges, and because it’s probably the boldest – all reasons why it may just be their best", and he went on to state that "it has everything any music fan could love." In 2013, Stereogum ranked it the 5th-best Spoon album.

== Track listing ==
All tracks are written by Britt Daniel except where noted.

No.	Title	Length
1.	"Utilitarian"	1:51
2.	"The Minor Tough"	2:43
3.	"The Guestlist/The Execution"	2:03
4.	"Reservations"	2:36
5.	"30 Gallon Tank" (Daniel, Jim Eno)	4:00
6.	"Car Radio"	1:30
7.	"Metal Detektor"	3:39
8.	"June's Foreign Spell"	3:00
9.	"Chloroform"	1:10
10.	"Metal School" (Daniel, Josh Zarbo)	2:54
11.	"Staring at the Board"	0:54
12.	"No You're Not"	1:43
13.	"Quincy Punk Episode"	2:17
14.	"Advance Cassette"	2:54
Total length:		33:14

2001 UK release bonus tracks
No.	Title	Length
15.	"Revenge!"	2:38
16.	"Shake It Off"	2:44
17.	"I Could Be Underground"	2:06
Total length:		40:42

2002 Merge reissue bonus tracks
No.	Title	Length
15.	"Laffitte Don't Fail Me Now"	3:45
16.	"The Agony of Laffitte"	3:27
Total length:		40:26

== Personnel ==
- Britt Daniel
- Joshua Zarbo
- Jim Eno
