= Metal School =

Metal School may refer to:

- "Metal School", a song by Spoon from their 1998 album A Series of Sneaks
- Metal Skool, a Los Angeles-based glam metal cover band that became Steel Panther
