= Nefarious (EP) =

EP by Spoon
- Released: 1994
- Recorded: February 6, 1994 in Austin, Texas
- Genre: Indie rock
- Length: 10:50
- Label: Fluffer Records

Spoon chronology
Nefarious (1994)	Telephono (1996)

Nefarious is an EP by indie rock band Spoon, their debut recording. It was released in 1994 on a tiny Texas-based imprint called Fluffer Records.

== Track listing ==
All songs written by Britt Daniel, except "This Damn Nation" by The Godfathers.

1. "Government Darling" – 2:33
2. "This Damn Nation" – 2:31
3. "Nefarious" – 2:45
4. "Not Turning Off" – 3:01
- "Government Darling", "Nefarious" and "Not Turning Off" were later re-recorded and released on Telephono.

== Personnel ==
Personnel taken from The Nefarious EP liner notes.

Spoon

- Britt Daniel
- Jim Eno
- Andy Maguire
- Wendel Stivers

Additional personnel

- Jim Andrews – engineer
- Stan Nuevo – second engineer
- Wonderboy Ltd. – cover art
