= Cape Dory (disambiguation) =

Cape dory (Zeus capensis), a fish of the genus Zeus.

Cape Dory may also refer to:

- Cape Dory (album), by American indie pop band Tennis
- Cape Dory Yachts, a Massachusetts-based fiberglass boat builder
