= Young & Old =

Studio album by Tennis
- Released: February 13, 2012
- Genres: Indie pop, surf pop
- Length: 32:59
- Label: Fat Possum

Tennis chronology
Cape Dory (2011)	Young & Old (2012)	Small Sound (2013)

Professional ratings
Review scores
Source	Rating
AllMusic	3.5/5 stars
Consequence of Sound	3.5/5 stars
Paste	6.7/10
Slant Magazine	3/5 stars

Young & Old is the second studio album by American indie pop band Tennis, released in 2012 on Fat Possum Records.

== Track listing ==
No.	Title	Length
1.	"It All Feels the Same"	3:23
2.	"Origins"	3:28
3.	"My Better Self"	3:44
4.	"Traveling"	3:01
5.	"Petition"	3:11
6.	"Robin"	3:04
7.	"High Road"	3:03
8.	"Dreaming"	3:14
9.	"Take Me to Heaven"	3:25
10.	"Never to Part"	3:26
Total length:		32:59

== Charts ==
Chart (2012)	Peak position
US Billboard 200	148
US Independent Albums (Billboard)	18
US Top Alternative Albums (Billboard)	20
US Top Rock Albums (Billboard)	32
