= Say Something (album) =

Studio album by Via Audio
- Released: September 25, 2007
- Recorded: 2007
- Studios: Public Hi-Fi; Convergence Recording
- Genre: Indie pop
- Length: 41:15
- Label: SideCho
- Producers: Jim Eno; Dan Molad

Via Audio chronology
Via Audio (EP) (2004)	Say Something (2007)	Animalore (2010)

Professional ratings
Review scores
Source	Rating
AbsolutePunk	8/10
Pitchfork Media	(7.7/10)
Tiny Mix Tapes	3.5/5 stars

Say Something (full title Say Something Say Something Say Something) is the first full-length album by the American indie pop band Via Audio. It was released on September 25, 2007, by indie Sidecho Records in the United States and Kurofone Records in Japan.

== Critical reception ==
The Pitch called the album "a blanket of fuzzy pop to warm the blustery days ahead." Paste praised the "conclusive" and "strongly-willed" songs, calling them a departure from indie-rock song-writing norms.

== Track listing ==
1. "Developing Active People" – 3:31
2. "Modern Day Saint" – 4:19
3. "Harder on Me" – 3:14
4. "Numb" – 3:50
5. "We Can Be Good" – 4:41
6. "Presents" - 3:32
7. "From Clouds" – 3:36
8. "Enunciation" – 3:35
9. "Collaboration" – 4:42
10. "I Can't Focus" – 3:49
11. "Hazmat" – 3:09

The names for tracks 10 & 11 were mixed up on the release of the album.
