= Kill the Moonlight =

Studio album by Spoon
- Released: August 20, 2002
- Recorded: January – March 2002
- Studio: The Garage (Public Hi-Fi) (Austin, Texas)
- Genres: Indie rock; art rock; post-punk revival
- Length: 34:50
- Labels: Merge; 12XU
- Producers: Britt Daniel; Jim Eno; Mike McCarthy

Spoon chronology
Girls Can Tell (2001)	Kill the Moonlight (2002)	Gimme Fiction (2005)

Singles from Gimme Fiction
- 1. "Someone Something" Released: 2002; 2. "Jonathan Fisk" Released: 2002; 3. "Stay Don't Go" Released: 2003; 4. "The Way We Get By" Released: 2003

Kill the Moonlight is the fourth studio album by American rock band Spoon released on August 20, 2002, through Merge Records. The album features a stripped-down, minimal sound that incorporates various different instruments such as tambourines and pianos along with an idiosyncratic production style. The album has gone on to receive critical acclaim with its lead single "The Way We Get By" being used in various television shows, and is regarded as one of Spoon's best albums.

== Composition ==
On the first couple of albums, I thought the idea of having piano was very embarrassing. It didn’t seem like something Wire would do; it didn’t seem cool [...] But that was just our very limited frame of mind… We started realizing there’s nothing not cool about Marvin Gaye, there’s nothing not cool about Plastic Ono Band, and there’s piano all over those things, so why not fucking loosen up a little bit?

— Britt Daniel

The album has been noted for its minimal and rhythm-driven sound. Eric Carr of Pitchfork described it as "an adventure in starkness", going on to write: "Like some of the best minimalists in music, Spoon use the null and void to create tension which bolsters and sets apart every nuance of the music-- every handclap, every reverberating crash, every beep from the synthesizer." Heather Phares of AllMusic wrote that the group "follow(ed up) such a cathartic album as Girls Can Tell with a collection of tougher, leaner, and meaner songs like "All the Pretty Girls Go to the City," which sounds like the inverse of Girls' "Everything Hits at Once"". Daniel Pike of BBC found the album to be "terribly, terribly British" in sound, characterizing it as a "distinctly lo-fi post-punk offering" and noting "an air of tenderness and sincerity about" it. Tom Breihan of Stereogum noted elements of "toothy Wire minimalism, mid-period Motown strut, Kinks-y melodic twinkle" in the album's sound, even going on to suggest the influence of Timbaland "since (his music) brought the same sense that empty space was a virtue, that a perfectly-placed sound-effect could be the most memorable part of a song".

The opener "Small Stakes" features "Steve Nieve-style keyboards and (a) shoutout to Har Mar Superstar" with lyrics "alluding to class concerns". It features a fast-paced and syncopated tambourine part throughout, primarily in lieu of drums, which Daniel later confirmed was played by him. "The Way We Get By", the lead single from the album, is "built on a rollicking piano line and handclaps" with lyrics that "had its roots in the (Daniel)’s more recent memories of scraping together enough cash to go to shows, alter his mind and find salvation in Iggy Pop". In an interview with Pitchfork, Daniel revealed that the song initially started out as "off-the-cuff" before turning into "a glorified, fucked-up-relationship song about a scrappy couple getting high in the backseat, making love with the song ‘Some Weird Sin,’ seeking out people that don’t speak very much [...]". The aforementioned BBC article noted "shades of Tim Burgess falsetto on "Something To Look Forward To" and "Stay Don't Go"". The former has been described by the Stereogum article as a "nicely knotty, a too-short spurt of sass" whilst the latter track "sports a human beatbox rhythm" or "just a guy breathing funny", the music on top of it described as being "made up of Depeche Mode type flourishes and Prince meets Bowie vocals" The song "Jonathan Fisk" is based on a bullying middle school classmate of the songwriter Britt Daniel. According to Daniel, "Fisk" is now a fan of the band, and "came to all of [Spoon's] shows for about two or three years". It has been musically described as being "more punk-ish but still relatively spare, even when a saxophone surfaces". "Paper Tiger" has been singled out by many critics as being the album's best track, Tiny Mix Tapes describing it as "a minimalist ditty [...] With orchestral swells, reversed effects, rim clicks, piano chords, and a haunting vocal melody". Doug Wallen of PopMatters wrote that the song breathed "sweet new life into classic love-song fodder -- "I'm not dumb / Just want to hold your hand" and "I will be there with you when you turn out the light"".

"Someone Something" features a heavy Elvis Costello influence (of whom Daniel is an "ardent admirer"), Delusions of Adequacy describing it as " jump(ing) and hop(ping) along [...] a neat piano and nicely placed drum fills". The following track "Don't Let It Get You Down" too has piano "but also with newfound bluesy twang", the intro described as "part Stones and part Elvis Costello". "All The Pretty Girls Go To The City" has been described as "another fun song highlighted by good piano work that mimics the vocal lines". The PopMatters article writes that the song is "haunted by brooding keys and, finally, lush instrumentation, like a Motown 45 transmitted from the wrong side of the tracks. "You Gotta Feel It" has been described as "eternally bluesy" and features "distant backing vocals and baritone saxes". "Back To The Life" features a tambourine and handclaps that "come in at the exact right moments". The song "opens with a demented cackle, then laying on heavy rhythmic sampling and melodic trickery". The closing track "Vittorio E" has been described as "an undulating, vaguely psychedelic ballad" and an "anti-ballad", the aforementioned Pitchfork article describing it as "a 3-minute synopsis of the album's emotional heft".

== Release ==
Released on August 20, 2002, through Merge Records, Kill the Moonlight was one of the record label's biggest records, behind Neutral Milk Hotel's In the Aeroplane Over the Sea and Magnetic Fields' 69 Love Songs, with 75,000 copies sold by July 2004 and roughly 153,000 by December 2009.

== Reception ==
Professional ratings
Aggregate scores
Source	Rating
Metacritic	88/100
Review scores
Source	Rating
AllMusic	4/5 stars
Blender	4/5 stars
Entertainment Weekly	A
Los Angeles Times	3.5/4 stars
NME	7/10
Pitchfork	8.9/10
Rolling Stone	3/5 stars
Spin	7/10
Uncut	4/5 stars
The Village Voice	A

The album received "universal critical acclaim" upon release, with many critics and fans alike later on considering it to be one of Spoon's best albums.

== Accolades ==
The album received end-of-year accolades from a variety of publications in both the US and the UK, continuing to receive end-of-decade ones as well after it came to an end. The majority of the latter, as shown below, came from US publications.

Publication	Country	Accolade	Rank
Blender	US	100 Greatest Indie Albums	49
Rhapsody	US	Alt/Indie's Best Albums of the Decade	5
Pitchfork	US	200 Greatest Albums of the '00s	19
Rolling Stone	US	100 Best Albums of the Decade	51
The A.V. Club	US	The best music of the decade	15
Paste	US	The best albums of the decade	12
Slant	US	100 Best Albums of the Aughts	26
Consequence of Sound	US	Top Albums of the 2000s	57
Spin	US	300 Best Albums of the Past 30 Years (1985–2014)	163
Cokemachineglow	Canada	Top 100 Albums of the 2000s	16
Pure Pop	Mexico	The 25 Best Albums Since Kurt Cobain Left Us (2003)	10

== Use in other media ==
"The Way We Get By" was used on the television shows The O.C., Shameless and Hustle as well as in the films Mean Creek, The Puffy Chair and Stranger Than Fiction. It is also played in a 2020 YouTube commercial. "Don't Let It Get You Down" can be heard in the 2005 comedy Waiting....

== Track listing ==
All tracks are written by Britt Daniel except where noted.

No.	Title	Length
1.	"Small Stakes"	3:00
2.	"The Way We Get By"	2:38
3.	"Something to Look Forward To" (Daniel, Miles Zuniga)	2:17
4.	"Stay Don't Go"	3:35
5.	"Jonathon Fisk"	3:15
6.	"Paper Tiger"	3:07
7.	"Someone Something"	2:48
8.	"Don't Let It Get You Down" (Daniel, Mel Larson, Jerry Marcellino, Deke Richards)	3:29
9.	"All the Pretty Girls Go to the City"	3:12
10.	"You Gotta Feel It"	1:29
11.	"Back to the Life"	2:21
12.	"Vittorio E."	3:39
Total length:		34:50

== Personnel ==
Personnel taken from Kill the Moonlight liner notes.

Spoon

- Britt Daniel – vocals, guitar
- Jim Eno – drums
- Joshua Zarbo – bass guitar

Additional musicians

- Matt Brown – saxophone
- John Clayton – bass guitar
- Eggo Johanson – keys, piano, tambourine
- Roman Kuebler – bass guitar
- Mike McCarthy – 12 string guitar
- Brad Shenfield – dabouke

Production

- Britt Daniel – production, mixing, engineering (The Catacomb)
- Jim Eno – production, mixing, engineering (The Garage)
- Mike McCarthy – production, mixing, engineering (The Garage)
- Robbie Adams – additional engineering (The Catacomb)
- John Golden – mastering
- JJ Golden – editing

== Charts ==
The album peaked at number 23 on the US Independent album charts.

Year	Chart	Position
2002	Billboard Top Independent Albums	23
