= Ritual in Repeat =

Studio album by Tennis
- Released: September 9, 2014
- Genres: Indie pop; surf pop
- Length: 38:05
- Label: Communion
- Producers: Patrick Carney; Jim Eno; Richard Swift

Tennis chronology
Small Sound (2013)	Ritual in Repeat (2014)	Yours Conditionally (2017)

Professional ratings
Aggregate scores
Source	Rating
Metacritic	77/100
Review scores
Source	Rating
Consequence of Sound	B
Exclaim!	8/10
musicOMH	3.5/5 stars
Paste	7.9/10
Pitchfork	7.0/10
Sputnikmusic	4/5
Under the Radar	6/10 stars

Ritual in Repeat is the third album by American indie pop band Tennis, released on September 9, 2014, on Communion Records. The album was produced by Patrick Carney, Jim Eno and Richard Swift.

== Track listing ==
No.	Title	Length
1.	"Night Vision"	4:17
2.	"Never Work for Free"	3:29
3.	"Needle and a Knife"	3:24
4.	"I'm Callin'"	3:34
5.	"Bad Girls"	4:31
6.	"Timothy"	4:07
7.	"Viv Without the N"	3:44
8.	"Wounded Heart"	1:47
9.	"This Isn't My Song"	3:31
10.	"Solar on the Rise"	3:08
11.	"Meter and Line"	2:32
Total length:		38:05

== Personnel ==
Personnel adapted from Ritual in Repeat liner notes:

Tennis

- Alaina Moore – vocals, keyboards, piano, guitar
- Patrick Riley – guitar, bass guitar, keyboards, percussion
- James Barone – drums, percussion

Additional musicians

- Jim Eno – drums

== Charts ==
Chart (2014)	Peak position
US Billboard 200	189
US Independent Albums (Billboard)	30
