= Via Audio =

American indie pop band

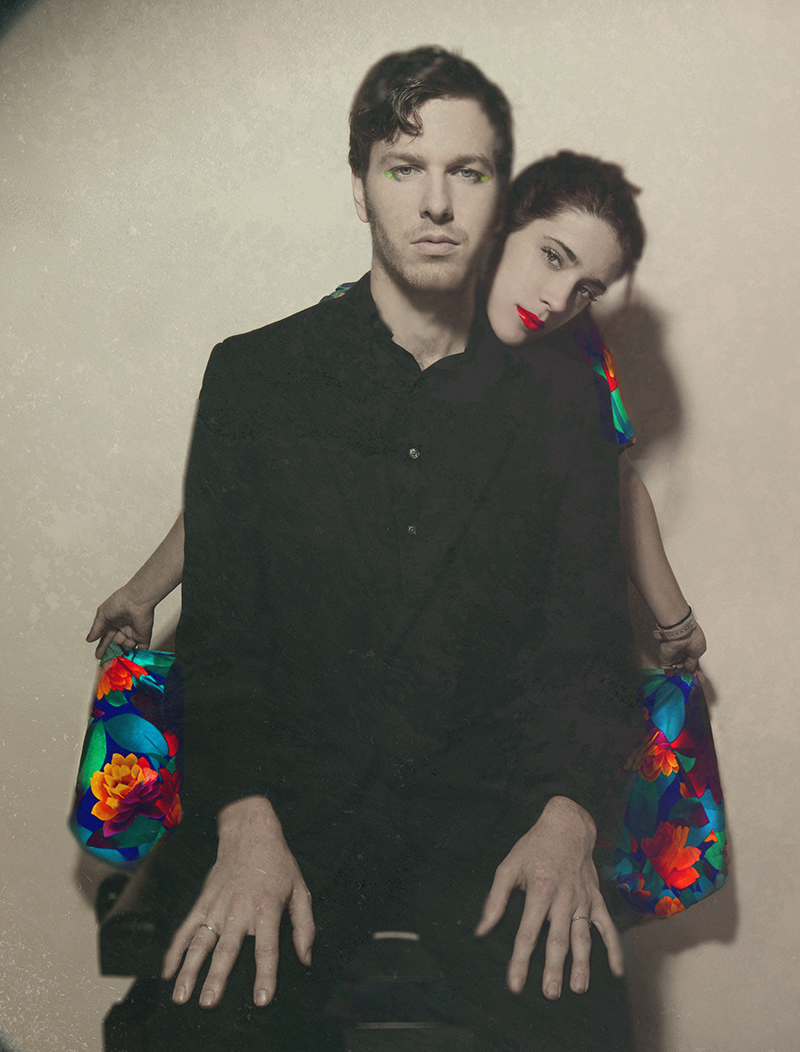
- Tom Deis & Jessica Martins of Via Audio

Background information
- Origin: Boston, MA, Brooklyn, NY, United States
- Genres: Indie pop Alternative rock
- Years active: 2002–present
- Labels: Undertow Music; Sidecho Records; Kill Normal Records
- Members: Tom Deis; Jessica Martins
- Past members: Dan Molad; David Lizmi; Adam Sturtevant
- Website: http://iloveviaaudio.com

Via Audio is an American indie pop band from Brooklyn, New York. Their first full-length album Say Something, was released in 2007 by Sidecho Records, to positive reviews from prominent independent music publications such as Pitchfork Media, Alternative Press, Spin Magazine, & Tiny Mix Tapes. The band met while attending college at Berklee College of Music in Boston, Massachusetts, later moving to Brooklyn, New York. They released their second full-length album titled Animalore on Undertow Music on March 9, 2010; it was produced by Spoon's Jim Eno. Their third full-length album titled "Natural Language" was self-released on March 25, 2014. It was produced and recorded by Dan Molad (of Lucius) in Brooklyn, NY.

== Biography ==
Via Audio met and formed in 2003 while attending Berklee College of Music in Boston, Massachusetts and released a self-titled EP on Connecticut-based record label Kill Normal Records the following year. The lineup at that time consisted of Jessica Martins (vocals, keys, guitar), Dan Molad (vocals, guitar, drums), David Lizmi (Bass), and Tom Deis (Vocals, Guitar). The band toured regionally through the northeastern United States and gained a strong following in their then hometown of Boston.

In 2007, the band signed to California-based label Sidecho Records, and garnered much attention from various music blogs, zines, and critics after Death Cab for Cutie guitarist Chris Walla called them his "new favorite band" in his column in Under the Radar Magazine, an Independent Music publication.

Sidecho released the band's debut full-length album, Say Something, recorded earlier that year in Austin, Texas with Spoon drummer and producer Jim Eno, on September 25, 2007, in the United States. Additionally, Kurofone Records released the album in Japan. The album was met with praise from prominent Independent Music publications such as Pitchfork Media, who rated the album a 7.7/10 and called the album.

"a catchy pop record that's serious: not gloomy, not mournful, and not pretentious. It's serious and earnest, it's occasionally sad, but there is such a beautiful gloss over everything that it sticks, hurts, and feels delicious."

The band has toured extensively in the past two years, including tours through North America with acts such as White Rabbits, Someone Still Loves You Boris Yeltsin, and Jukebox The Ghost, as well as a brief tour of Japan supporting Spoon. The band has also played at numerous festivals including the SXSW Music Festival in Austin, Texas, the Monolith Festival in Denver, Colorado, and the CMJ Music Showcase in New York City, where Spin.com named them "one of the nine hottest bands playing CMJ".

In 2007 Drummer, Guitarist, and co-vocalist Dan Molad left the group to pursue other projects. Molad was replaced as the band's live drummer by Adam Sturtevant, with Deis (Guitar) and Martins (Guitar, Keys) remaining on lead vocals, and Lizmi remaining on Bass.

Via Audio released their second full-length album titled Animalore on Undertow Music on March 9, 2010; it was also produced by Spoon's Jim Eno. The first single, "Babies", is available for download now at Filter Magazine's website, filtermagazine.com.

They self-released a new record, titled "Natural Language", on March 25, 2014. It is available in limited edition CD or 12" vinyl formats, as well as on all major digital platforms, and was produced and recorded by Dan Molad (Lucius) in Brooklyn, NY.

== Members ==
- Tom Deis - Singer/Songwriter/Guitar
- Jessica Martins - Singer/Songwriter/Guitar/Synthesizer

Former

- Dan Molad - Singer/Songwriter/Drums/Guitar (2003–2007)
- David Lizmi - Bass/Synthesizer (2003-2013)
- Adam Sturtevant - Drums

== Discography ==
Studio albums

- 2004 Via Audio - EP (Kill Normal)
- 2007 Say Something (Sidecho)
- 2010 Animalore (Undertow Music Collective)
- 2014 "Natural Language" (March 25, 2014)
