= The Alien Beats =

The Alien Beats is a band created by Britt Daniel.

Before creating Spoon, Britt Daniel toyed around with a few musical acts in the Austin area. After his stint with Skellington, fellow KTSB (now KVRX) DJ Brad Shenfeld asked Britt if he would be interested in starting a country/rockabilly band. Britt declined, but then called Brad back a week later and agreed. Britt played bass and Brad played guitar; they both shared vocal duties. They called the band The Alien Beats. During a demo recording session drummer Jim Eno was brought in as a fill-in when the original drummer could not make it. Jim soon after became the band's permanent drummer. This association led to the formation of Spoon in the following year.

== Releases ==
Cavin' In

EP by The Alien Beats
- Released: 1993
- Genre: Indie rock
- Length: 9:48
- Label: Syncretic Records

=== Cavin' In ===
1. "Cavin' In" - 3:13
2. "Under The Table" - 2:07
3. "Time Won't Tell" - 4:28

=== Notes ===
Britt Daniel wrote and sang lead for track 2: "Under The Table".
