= Saturday (The Reivers album) =

Studio album by The Reivers
- Released: 1987
- Genre: Rock
- Length: 44:51
- Label: Capitol (re-released 2002 by Dualtone)
- Producer: Don Dixon

The Reivers chronology
| Translate Slowly (1985) | Saturday (1987) | End Of The Day (1989) |

Professional ratings
Review scores
| Source | Rating |
|---|---|
| Allmusic | 3/5 stars |

Saturday is a 1987 album by The Reivers. It was their major label debut on Capitol Records. Notable tracks include “In Your Eyes,” which is the only song for which the band produced an official video (directed by Kevin Kerslake); and "Wait for Time," which Rolling Stone's Michael Azerrad described as "an amazing moment on an amazing album." Los Angeles Times critic Don Waller called "In Your Eyes" "one of the most disarmingly charming, guitars-chime-like-freedom-flashing non-hit singles of 1988 or any other year." The packaging of the 2002 Dualtone Vintage CD reissue includes a brief essay about the band by TV writer-producer Rob Thomas, who had himself been a musician in Austin. However, the CD reissue packaging does not include the lyrics that had been included with the original Capitol release.

== Track listing ==
1. "What Am I Doing?" (John Croslin) – 2:35
2. "A Test" (John Croslin) – 3:31
3. "Once in a While" (John Croslin) – 3:08
4. "Electra" (John Croslin) – 2:50
5. "In Your Eyes" (John Croslin, Kim Longacre) – 3:38
6. "Karate Party" (John Croslin) – 2:31
7. "Wait for Time" (John Croslin, Kim Longacre) – 4:03
8. "Secretariat" (John Croslin) – 4:07
9. "Baby" (John Croslin) – 2:48
10. "Saturday" (John Croslin) – 3:47
11. "Ragamuffin Man" (John Croslin) – 3:26
12. "Jeanie" (John Croslin) – 3:13
13. "Bidin' Time" (Kim Longacre) – 2:59
14. "True Love" (Daniel Johnston) – 2:08

The last three tracks are "bonus" songs on the 2002 Dualtone re-release. They were not included on the original album.
