= Animalore =

Studio album by Via Audio
- Released: February 23, 2010
- Recorded: 2009
- Genre: Indie pop
- Label: Undertow Music
- Producer: Jim Eno

Via Audio chronology
Say Something (2007)	Animalore (2010)

Professional ratings
Review scores
Source	Rating
Pitchfork	4.8/10

Animalore is the second studio album by the rock band Via Audio. It was released in 2010 by the independent record label Undertow Music.

== Critical reception ==
Exclaim! wrote: "If you are willing to overlook the band's sometimes pedestrian take on indie pop, Animalore is, at best, an album that contains some of the most carefree and sunny verse/chorus/verse music this side of MGMT."

== Track listing ==
1. "Hello"
2. "Goldrush"
3. "Babies"
4. "Tigers"
5. "Digital"
6. "Wanted"
7. "Too Quiet"
8. "Lizard"
9. "Summer Stars"
10. "Oh Blah Wee"
11. "Olga"
12. "Happening"

== Personnel ==
Jessica Martins: keyboards, guitars and vocals
David Lizmi: bass guitar
Tom Deis: guitar, vocals
Adam Sturtevant: drums
