= Pollen (album) =

Studio album by Tennis
- Released: February 10, 2023
- Genre: Pop
- Length: 35:23
- Label: Mutually Detrimental
- Producers: Alaina Moore; Patrick Riley

Tennis studio albums chronology
Swimmer (2020)	Pollen (2023)	Face Down in the Garden (2025)

Singles from Pollen
- 1. "One Night with the Valet" Released: November 15, 2022; 2. "Let's Make a Mistake Tonight" Released: January 10, 2023; 3. "Forbidden Doors" Released: February 1, 2023

Pollen is the sixth studio album by the musical duo Tennis, released via their own label Mutually Detrimental on February 10, 2023. It was preceded by the singles "One Night with the Valet", "Let's Make a Mistake Tonight", and "Forbidden Doors". The album received acclaim from critics.

== Critical reception ==
Professional ratings
Aggregate scores
Source	Rating
Metacritic	76/100
Review scores
Source	Rating
AllMusic	4/5 stars
Exclaim!	8/10
Gigwise	9/10 stars
Pitchfork	6.7/10
Slant Magazine	3.5/5 stars

Pollen received a score of 76 out of 100 based on seven critics' reviews on review aggregator Metacritic, indicating "generally favorable reviews". Reviewing the album for AllMusic, Tim Sendra opined that Pollen's main point of difference in Tennis' catalogue is its "occasional distorted guitar, a little more bump in the rhythm section, and overall punchier production" and that while the "small deviations might feel drastic at first, [...] the sum of the parts is still as pleasant as ever once the album ends".

Everett Amber Ellis of Exclaim! found the album, along with its predecessor Swimmer, to be "indebted to the sparkle of the '80s—albeit the more restrained and sophisticated side of a decade infamous for its more gaudy tastes", and "front-heavy as most Tennis albums are", writing that its "highlights lie largely in its singles". Evie Gower of Gigwise described the album as "filled to the brim with dream pop synthesisers and a melding of strings, a mixture of classical and contemporary components that make Alaina Moore's voice as ethereal as ever", as well as a "funky backdrop of various instruments and vocal tones" with lyrics that feel like "a love letter to the highs and lows of life".

Eric Mason of Slant Magazine wrote that Moore and Riley "take one step closer to the present by interspersing their 20th-century callbacks with nods to turn-of-the-millennium pop-rock" on Pollen, finding the "common thread" that ties the album's songs together is "escapism, whether it be the isolation of the open sea or the insular behind-the-scenes goings on of a hotel". Adlan Jackson of Pitchfork felt that the duo's "persistent melodies quiver with the same earnestness as always, and their self-production continues to hit its stride", elaborating that "the overall airiness on Pollen gives the sense that Tennis are continuing to have a blast making music that glides from one hook to the next."

== Track listing ==
All tracks are written by and produced by Alaina Moore and Patrick Riley.

Pollen track listing
No.	Title	Length
1.	"Forbidden Doors"	3:54
2.	"Glorietta"	4:01
3.	"Let's Make a Mistake Tonight"	4:14
4.	"One Night with the Valet"	1:53
5.	"Pollen Song"	3:53
6.	"Hotel Valet"	3:54
7.	"Paper"	3:00
8.	"Gibraltar"	3:57
9.	"Never Been Wrong"	3:26
10.	"Pillow for a Cloud"	3:11
Total length:		35:23

== Personnel ==
- Alaina Moore – vocals, synthesizers, piano, guitar and production
- Patrick Riley – guitars, bass guitars, synthesizers, auxiliary percussion, drum programming and production
- Steve Voss – drums and engineering assistance
- Griffith James – ambient noise on "Gibraltar"
- Alan Sumler – Latin translation on "Never Been Wrong"
- Claudius Mittendorfer – mixing
- Joe LaPorta – mastering
- Luca Venter – artwork
- Allison Freeman – artwork

== Charts ==
Chart performance for Pollen
Chart (2023)	Peak position
US Top Album Sales (Billboard)	65
