= Face Down in the Garden =

Studio album by Tennis
- Released: April 25, 2025
- Length: 29:18
- Label: Mutually Detrimental
- Producer: Alaina Moore; Patrick Riley

Tennis chronology
Pollen (2023)	Face Down in the Garden (2025)

Face Down in the Garden is the seventh and final studio album by the American indie pop duo Tennis. It was released on April 25, 2025, under their own label Mutually Detrimental.

== Background ==
On April 11, 2025, two weeks prior to the release of Face Down in the Garden, Tennis announced that they would be going on an indefinite hiatus following a farewell tour in promotion of this album. The husband-and-wife duo of Alaina Moore and Patrick Riley came to this decision following the completion of the album, saying in a press release that they have came to the conclusion that "we had said everything we wanted to say and achieved everything we wanted to achieve with our band" in addition to stating that this album will be their last "in this configuration as Tennis".

== Promotion ==
The album's lead single, "Weight of Desire", was released on February 7, 2025, simultaneously with the album's announcement. A music video for this song directed by Blossom Liu and Danny Gray was also released. The second single, "At the Wedding", was released on March 7, 2025. The third and final single, "12 Blown Tires", was released in April 2025.

== Track listing ==
All tracks are written by and produced by Alaina Moore and Patrick Riley.

Face Down in the Garden track listing
No.	Title	Length
1.	"At the Apartment"	2:15
2.	"Weight of Desire"	3:40
3.	"At the Wedding"	4:37
4.	"Always the Same"	3:17
5.	"Sister"	3:46
6.	"Through the Mirror"	3:33
7.	"I Can Only Describe You"	2:04
8.	"12 Blown Tires"	4:12
9.	"In Love (Release the Doves)"	1:54
Total length:		29:18

== Personnel ==
Credits adapted from the album's liner notes.

=== Tennis ===
- Alaina Moore – vocals, piano, synthesizers, production
- Patrick Riley – guitar, bass, drum programming, synthesizers, auxiliary percussion, production, engineering

=== Additional contributors ===
- Steve Voss – drums, auxiliary percussion (tracks 1, 6)
- Dash Hutton – drums, auxiliary percussion (2–5, 7, 8)
- Odessa Jorgensen – strings (1, 3)
- Claudius Mittendorfer – mixing
- Dave Cooley – mastering
- Jake Supple – assistant engineering (2, 3, 5)
- Darren Vargas – cover photo
- Blossom Liu – art direction, packaging design
- Danny Gray – art direction, packaging design

== Reception ==
It received 6.8/10 review from Pitchfork.
