= Translate Slowly =

- Original cover art

Studio album by The Reivers
- Released: 1985
- Genre: Rock
- Length: 46:05
- Label: DB
- Producer: John Croslin and John Viehweg

The Reivers chronology
Translate Slowly (1985)	Saturday (1987)

Professional ratings
Review scores
Source	Rating
Allmusic	4.5/5 stars
Robert Christgau	B−

Translate Slowly is the 1985 debut album by The Reivers. This album was originally released under the band's original name, Zeitgeist, but was remixed in 1988 and re-released under the band name The Reivers, after another band claimed rights to the name "Zeitgeist."

The album received positive attention from many critics. The Austin Chronicle's Austin Music Awards ranked it the third best album of 1985, and Los Angeles Times critic Robert Hilburn included it on his year-end list of the best 100 records of the year. Ted Simons of Spin magazine called it "one of the better independent releases of the year", although he expressed reservations about what he found to be "heavy-handed" harmonies on some tracks.

The album's opening track, "Araby", was later covered by Hootie and the Blowfish on their 2000 collection Scattered, Smothered and Covered. Ryan Adams has named this album as a leading influence on his own musical style.

== Track listing ==
All songs written by the Reivers except where noted

1. "Araby" – 2:38
2. "Cowboys" – 2:39
3. "Legendary Man" – 4:37
4. "Blue Eyes" (Fred Rose) – 2:57
5. "She Digs Ornette" – 2:44
6. "Things Don't Change" – 4:08
7. "Translate Slowly" – 3:05
8. "Sound and the Fury" – 2:43
9. "Without My Sight" – 3:08
10. "I Knew" – 4:40
11. "Freight Train Rain" – 2:28
12. "Hill Country Theme" (Glenn Paxton) – 2:35
13. "Electra" – 3:04
14. "Wherehaus Jamb" – 1:51
15. "Walking the Cow" (Daniel Johnston) – 2:36

The last three tracks are "bonus" songs on the CD, which were not included on the original release of the album. Three tracks--"Wherehaus Jamb," "Freight Train Rain," and "Electra"—had been released previously on a 1984 EP entitled Zeitgeist, produced by John Croslin, recorded by John Viehweg, and released by DB Records.
