= Telephono =

Studio album by Spoon
- Released: April 23, 1996
- Recorded: Spring 1995
- Genres: Indie rock; alternative rock
- Length: 35:07
- Label: Matador
- Producer: John Croslin

Spoon chronology
Nefarious (1994)	Telephono (1996)	Soft Effects (1997)

Telephono is the debut studio album by the indie rock band Spoon. It was released on April 23, 1996, by Matador, then re-released in a two-disc package with the Soft Effects EP in 2006 by Merge Records. The album was produced by John Croslin, who had been one of the leaders of Austin's the Reivers, recording in Croslin's garage studio on a budget of $3,000.

"Idiot Driver" had previously appeared in an "alternate mix" form on the Peek-A-Boo Records November 1995 compilation album Bicycle Rodeo.

== Reception ==
Professional ratings
Review scores
Source	Rating
AllMusic	3.5/5 stars
Pitchfork Media	7.5/10
Rolling Stone	2/5 stars
Tom Hull – on the Web	A−

The album drew mainly positive critical attention, and in particular many comparisons to the Pixies. Texas Monthly called it "a snarling, devious suite of ultra-catchy songs that are simultaneously vivid and opaque." Initially, Telephono sold only a few thousand copies on LP, but later interest prompted a CD reissue.

== Track listing ==
All tracks are written by Britt Daniel except where noted.

No.	Title	Length
1.	"Don't Buy the Realistic"	3:54
2.	"Not Turning Off"	3:08
3.	"All the Negatives Have Been Destroyed"	2:37
4.	"Cvantez"	2:45
5.	"Nefarious"	2:47
6.	"Claws Tracking" (Daniel, Andy Maguire)	2:32
7.	"Dismember"	1:45
8.	"Idiot Driver"	1:37
9.	"Towner" (aMiniature)	3:05
10.	"Wanted to Be Your"	1:52
11.	"Theme to Wendel Stivers"	1:58
12.	"Primary"	1:10
13.	"The Government Darling"	2:23
14.	"Plastic Mylar"	3:26
Total length:		35:07

== Personnel ==
Spoon

- Britt Daniel
- Jim Eno
- Andy Maguire

Additional personnel

- John Croslin – production
- Greg Calbi – mastering
- Spoon – design
- Mark Ohe – design
- Frank Longo – design

== Charts ==
Chart (2006)	Peak position
Billboard Top Independent Albums	35
