= Love Ways =

EP by Spoon
- Released: October 24, 2000
- Recorded: June–July 2000
- Genre: Indie rock
- Length: 15:34
- Label: Merge Records
- Producer: Britt Daniel; Jim Eno

Spoon chronology
| 30 Gallon Tank (1998) | Love Ways (2000) | Girls Can Tell (2001) |

Professional ratings
Review scores
| Source | Rating |
|---|---|
| AllMusic | 3.5/5 stars |
| Pitchfork | 7.9/10 |

Love Ways is the fourth EP by the indie rock band Spoon. It was released on October 24, 2000, by Merge Records.

== Track listing ==
1. "Change My Life" – 4:29
2. "I Didn't Come Here to Die" – 3:08
3. "Jealousy" – 2:09
4. "The Figures of Art" – 1:46
5. "Chips and Dip" – 4:02

== Personnel ==
- Britt Daniel – all vocals, guitars, bass guitar, piano and all kinds of keyboards
- Jim Eno – big old drum kit
