= Pop Beloved =

Studio album by The Reivers
- Released: 1991
- Genre: Rock
- Length: 42:40
- Label: DB
- Producer: John Croslin

The Reivers chronology
End Of The Day (1989)	Pop Beloved (1991)	Second Story (2013)

Professional ratings
Review scores
Source	Rating
Allmusic	3/5 stars

Pop Beloved is the fourth album released by The Reivers, in 1991. After two albums on major label Capitol Records that were critically well-reviewed but commercially underperforming, they returned to the independent DB Records.

In her review of this record, Entertainment Weekly writer Gina Arnold gave it an "A" grade and said that "songwriter John Croslin sympathetically evokes the minuscule pleasures within the boredom of everyday life." Michael Corcoran of the Chicago Sun-Times also gave the album a strong review, saying that it contained "six or seven of the best songs that John Croslin and Kim Longacre have ever written" and was "irrefutable evidence that the Reivers are one of the best bands in existence."

After this album, the band dissolved and did not release another album until 2013.

== Track listing ==
1. "Breathin' Easy" (4:45)
2. "Over And Over" (3:34)
3. "Dragon Flies" (3:51)
4. "What You Wanna Do" (3:17)
5. "Keep Me Guessing" (3:39)
6. "Chinatown" (3:48)
7. "If I Had A Little Time Without You" (2:36)
8. "Katie" (2:41)
9. "Other Side" (3:20)
10. "Pop Beloved" (3:00)
11. "It's All One" (5:04)
12. "Second Chance" (2:41)
