= Tennis (band) =

American indie pop band

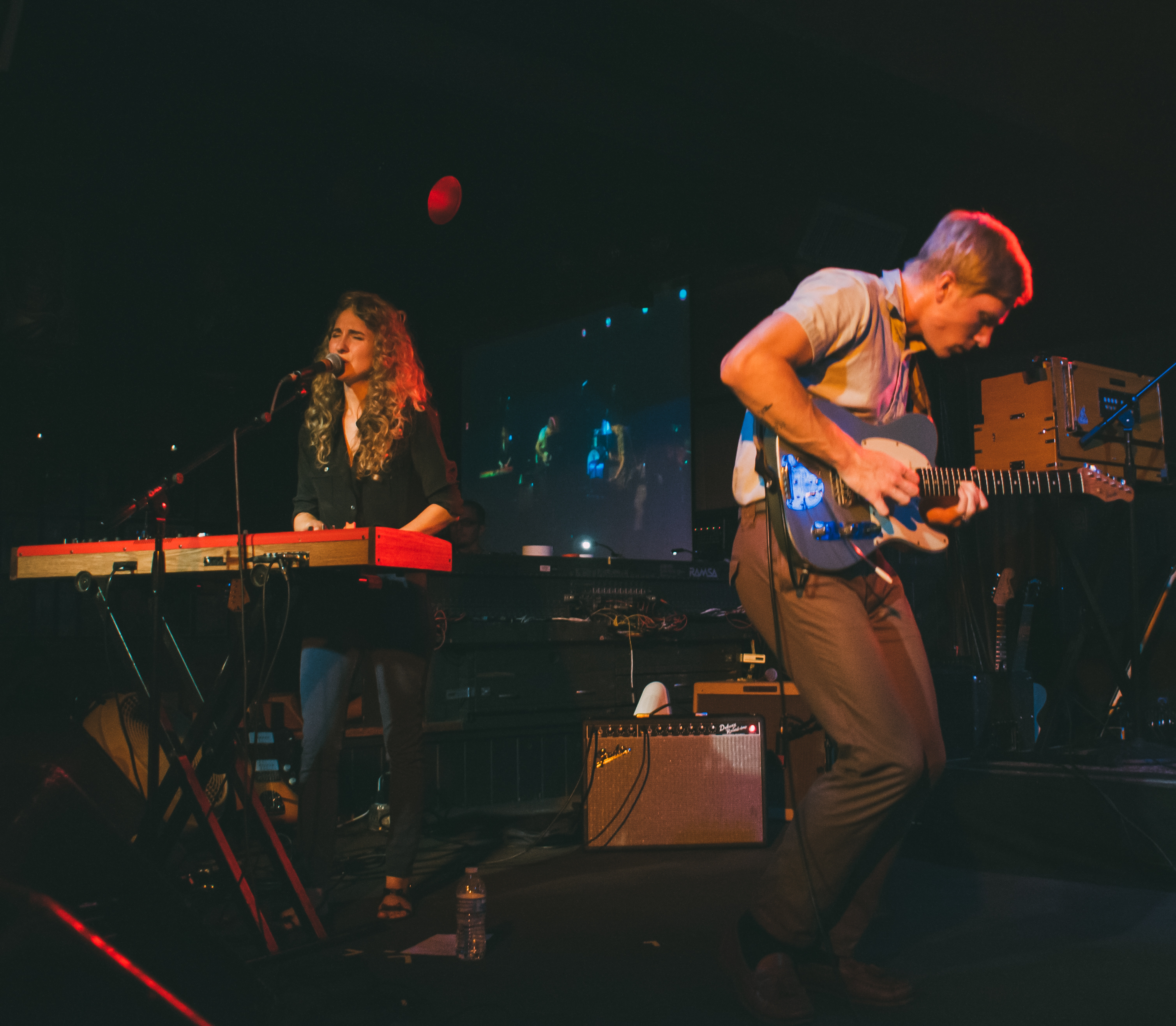
- Tennis performing in August 2012

Background information
- Origin: Denver, Colorado, U.S.
- Genres: Indie pop; dream pop; surf pop; lo-fi
- Years active: 2010–2025
- Labels: Fat Possum; Communion; Mutually Detrimental
- Members: Patrick Riley; Alaina Moore
- Website: tennis-music.com

Tennis was an American indie pop band from Denver made up of husband-and-wife duo Alaina Moore and Patrick Riley. The duo formed in 2010 and released their debut album, Cape Dory, in 2011. A second album, Young & Old, was released in 2012. Their third album, Ritual in Repeat (2014), was released on Communion Records.

The band's fourth album, Yours Conditionally, was released in 2017, and their fifth, Swimmer, followed in 2020. Swimmer was named one of the best albums of 2020 by USA Today. Their sixth studio album, Pollen, was released in 2023. In 2025, after announcing an indefinite hiatus, Tennis released their final studio album, Face Down in the Garden, on April 25, 2025.

Tennis' musical style combined elements of 1950s pop music with the soft rock of the 1970s. Lyrical topics explored by the band included sailing.

== Background ==
Alaina Moore (born May 9, 1985) and Patrick Riley (born September 9, 1986) met in a philosophy class as students at the University of Colorado Denver in 2008. The couple started the band after returning from an eight-month sailing expedition on the Eastern Atlantic Seaboard after their graduation. Moore initially had intended to go to law school. The songs on the band's first album document their experiences sailing. Before forming Tennis, Moore's earliest singing experience was in church choirs during her youth.

== Career ==
=== 2010–2013: Cape Dory and Young & Old ===
Tennis's first releases, both in July 2010, were the "Baltimore" EP on the Underwater Peoples label and the "South Carolina" single on Fire Talk. Tennis released their first studio album, Cape Dory, on Fat Possum Records in January 2011. The album, featured on NPR, was based on the couple's experiences during their sailing trip. During their first tour, James Barone joined the band on drums.

The second Tennis album, Young & Old, was released on Fat Possum Records on February 14, 2012, produced by Patrick Carney of The Black Keys, preceded by the single "Origins", which was issued on Forest Family Records on December 6, 2011. Tennis released a number of covers as self-released (digital) singles during 2011-2012, including versions of "Tell Her No" by the Zombies, "Is It True?" by Brenda Lee, "Tears in the Typing Pool" by Broadcast and "Guiding Light" by Television. American Songwriter named Tennis their Writer of the Week for the week of April 23, 2012. The band made several television appearances during 2012, performing "Origins" on The Tonight Show with Jay Leno on March 21, "It All Feels the Same" on Late Night with David Letterman on April 9, and "My Better Self" and "High Road" on Conan on July 25.

=== 2014–2015: Small Sound and Ritual in Repeat ===
In November 2013, Tennis released a 5-song EP, Small Sound, on Communion Records. It was previewed in Pitchfork Advance on October 29, 2013. In May 2014, the band supported sister-act Haim on their North American spring tour.

Tennis's third album, Ritual in Repeat, was released on Communion in September 2014 to critical acclaim. In a feature on the album, NPR Fresh Air's Terry Gross said, "Can you reinvent lively pop from the distant past?...songwriting team Tennis does just that with their new third album, Ritual in Repeat". NPR critic Milo Miles said, "On Ritual in Repeat, it's like Moore and Riley discover just how much ancient Latin, or in this case extinct pop styles, is their natural language". Barone left the group in 2015.

On March 29, 2015, Tennis performed at Burger Records' Burgerama 4 festival in Santa Ana, California. Two songs from the set, "I'm Callin" and "Never Work for Free", aired on the May 7 episode of Last Call with Carson Daly. Tennis was also selected to perform on April 1 at the United Artists Theater at the Ace Hotel in Los Angeles for "The Music of David Lynch" event, hosted by the David Lynch Foundation.

=== 2016–2018: Yours Conditionally and We Can Die Happy ===
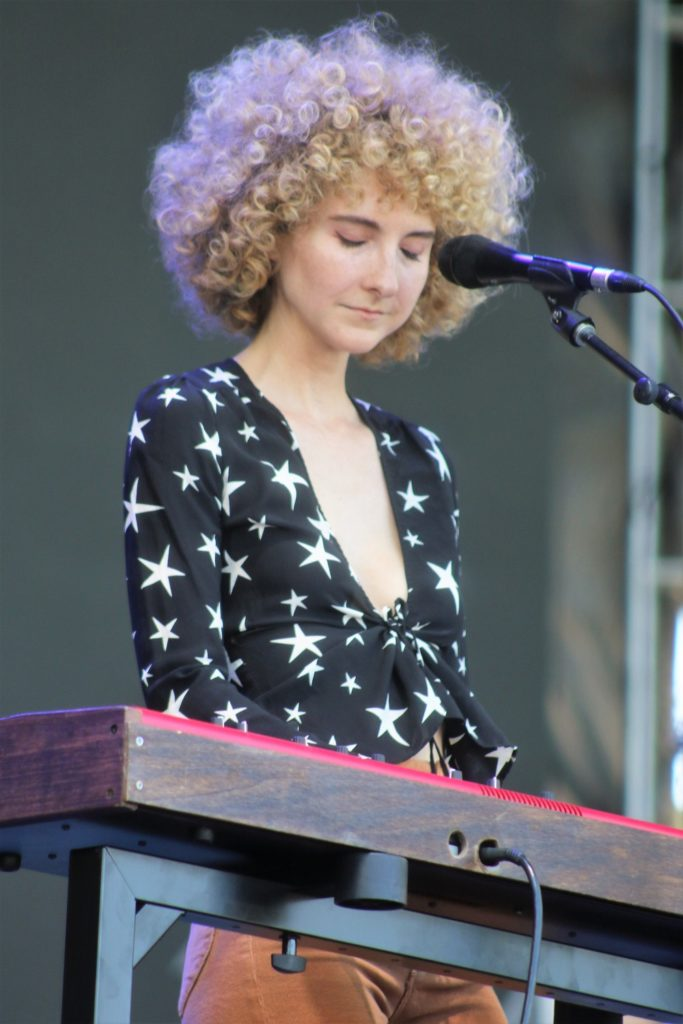
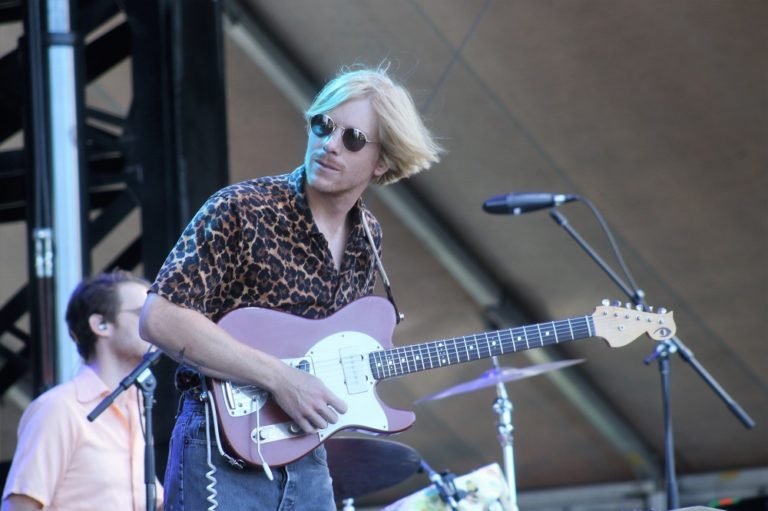
Alaina Moore (left) and Patrick Riley (right) performing at Grandoozy in Denver, September 2018

In early 2016, Moore and Riley again took a sailboat journey in the Pacific Ocean, intended to provide inspiration for their next album. The experience was blogged by Urban Outfitters.

The band's fourth and first self-produced album, Yours Conditionally, was released on March 5, 2017, on the band's own label, Mutually Detrimental. Record club Vinyl Me, Please chose Yours Conditionally as its album of the month, and the album debuted at No. 3 on Billboard's Alternative Albums chart and No. 2 on the Vinyl Albums chart.

Tennis appeared at the 2017 Coachella Valley Music and Arts Festival, and toured supporting Spoon and the Shins. On November 9, 2017, Tennis released the EP We Can Die Happy, preceded by the singles "No Exit" and "I Miss That Feeling". The band toured North America from November 2017 to February 2018 in support of the project.

=== 2019–2022: Swimmer ===
On November 8, 2019, Tennis released a new single, "Runner," followed by "Need Your Love" on January 20, 2020, and "How to Forgive" four days later. The three songs appeared as tracks 4, 2, and 3 (respectively) on Tennis's fifth album, titled Swimmer, released February 14, 2020.

Swimmer was again self-produced on Moore and Riley's Mutually Detrimental label. On October 9, 2020, Tennis released a cover of the song "Superstar."

Due to the COVID-19 pandemic, the band postponed its 2020 tour for Swimmer, with plans to tour the United States with Molly Burch from June 3 to November 17, 2021. In 2021 Tennis collaborated with the cartoon show Rick and Morty to produce the song “Borrowed Time”, which aired on episode 9 of Season 5, “Forgetting Sarick Mortshall”. The song was credited to “Rick and Morty and Tennis”.

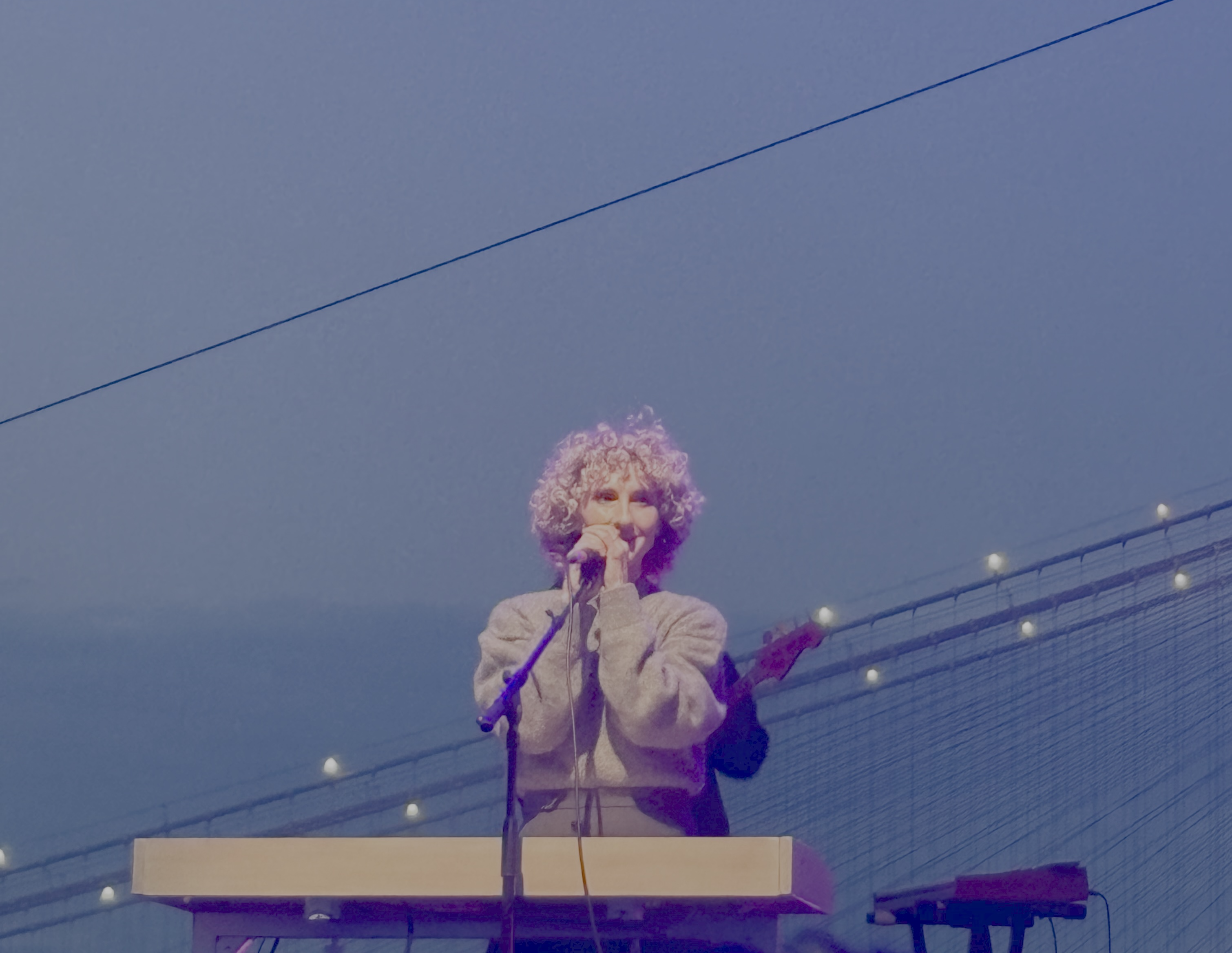
Alaina Moore performing at Pier 17 in New York

=== 2022–present: Pollen, Face Down in the Garden. ===
On November 15, 2022, Tennis released the single "One Night with the Valet" and announced their sixth studio album, Pollen, which was released on February 10, 2023 by Mutually Detrimental, Moore and Riley's label. A video for the song was released on December 13. The band released the second single, "Let's Make a Mistake Tonight", alongside a video for the track on January 10, 2023. The duo went on a month-long sailing trip to record the demos for this album. They often go on extended sailing trips for creative inspiration. On April 11, 2025, Tennis announced that they would release their final studio album, Face Down in the Garden. Tennis gave a farewell tour from May through September 2025.

== Band members ==
Core members

- Alaina Moore – vocals, keyboards, guitar (2010–2025)
- Patrick Riley – guitar, bass guitar (2010–2025)

Touring musicians

- James Barone – drums (2011–2015)
- Steve Voss – drums (2015–2025)
- Ryan Tullock – bass (2017–2025)

== Discography ==
=== Studio albums ===
- Cape Dory (Fat Possum, January 2011)
- Young & Old (Fat Possum, February 2012)
- Ritual in Repeat (Communion, September 2014)
- Yours Conditionally (Mutually Detrimental, March 2017)
- Swimmer (Mutually Detrimental, February 2020)
- Pollen (Mutually Detrimental, February 2023)
- Face Down in the Garden (Mutually Detrimental, April 2025)

=== EPs ===
- Small Sound (Communion, November 2013)
- We Can Die Happy (Mutually Detrimental, November 2017)

=== Singles ===
- "Baltimore" (Underwater Peoples, July 2010)
- "South Carolina" (Fire Talk, July 2010)
- "Is It True?" (self-released, June 2011)
- "Tell Her No" (self-released, October 2011)
- "Tears in the Typing Pool" (self-released, December 2011)
- "Origins" (Forest Family, December 2011)
- "My Better Self" / "Petition" (ATP, May 2012)
- "Guiding Light" (self-released, September 2012)
- "I'm Callin'" (Communion Records, August 2014)
- "Easter Island" (Universale Music Group North America, May 2015)
- "Ladies Don't Play Guitar" (Mutually Detrimental, August 2016)
- "In the Morning I'll Be Better" (Mutually Detrimental, December 2016)
- "Modern Woman" (Mutually Detrimental, January 2017)
- "My Emotions Are Blinding" (Mutually Detrimental, February 2017)
- "No Exit" (Mutually Detrimental, August 2017)
- "I Miss That Feeling" (Mutually Detrimental, October 2017)
- "Runner" (Mutually Detrimental, November 2019)
- "Need Your Love" (Mutually Detrimental, January 2020)
- "How to Forgive" (Mutually Detrimental, January 2020)
- "Superstar" (Mutually Detrimental, October 2020)
