= Dozy vs. Drake – Upon Further Consideration =

"Dozy Vs. Drake - Upon Further Consideration"

Single by Drake Tungsten
- Released: 1998
- Recorded: 1994–1996
- Genre: Indie rock Electronica
- Length: 33:55
- Label: Revival Records
- Producer: Chris Elles (aka Dozy)

"Dozy Vs. Drake - Upon Further Consideration" is a limited edition remix album released on CD5 through Revival Records. Dozy (aka Chris Elles) collaborated with Drake Tungsten to create a 33:55 minute long electronica-based track. According to AMG, "a DJ who called himself Dozy borrowed a handful of Tungsten's songs and remixed them to the point that they sounded nothing like the original."

== Track listing ==
1. "Upon Further Consideration" - 33:55
