= End of the Day (The Reivers album) =

Studio album by the Reivers
- Released: January 1989
- Genre: Rock
- Length: 45:49
- Label: Capitol
- Producers: John Croslin and Andy Metcalfe

The Reivers chronology
Saturday (1987)	End of the Day (1989)	Pop Beloved (1991)

Professional ratings
Review scores
Source	Rating
Allmusic	3/5 stars

End of the Day is a 1989 album by the Reivers. It was their second (and last) album for Capitol Records. Many of the songs on the album deal with themes of home and family, including "Star Telegram", which writer Sarah Vowell called "one of the prettiest evocations of the lovely, lazy side of the American dream, a family unwinding in a Fort Worth back yard"; and "Almost Home," which was later covered by Hootie and the Blowfish. Bill Wyman of the Chicago Sun-Times rated this album as the band's best, "a gently chiming river of an album".

== Track listing ==
1. "It's About Time" (John Croslin) – 2:55
2. "Star Telegram" (John Croslin) – 4:45
3. "Lazy Afternoon" (Jerome Moross, John LaTouche) – 3:01
4. "He Will Settle It" (John Croslin) – 2:51
5. "Cut Above" (John Croslin) – 2:47
6. "Discontent of Winter" (John Croslin, Kim Longacre) – 4:50
7. "Almost Home" (John Croslin) – 3:41
8. "Truth to Tell" (John Croslin) – 2:55
9. "Inside Out" (John Croslin) – 3:17
10. "Dude Man Hey" (John Croslin) – 1:47
11. "Your Secrets Are Not Safe" (John Croslin) – 3:22
12. "End of the Day" (John Croslin) – 3:47
13. "Tell Me So" (John Croslin) – 3:14
14. "On Green Dolphin Street" (Ned Washington, Bronisław Kaper) – 2:42

The last two tracks are "bonus" songs on the 2002 Dualtone re-release. They were not included on the original album.
