= Swimmer (Tennis album) =

Studio album by Tennis
- Released: February 14, 2020
- Length: 31:12
- Label: Mutually Detrimental
- Producers: Alaina Moore; Patrick Riley

Tennis studio albums chronology
We Can Die Happy (2017)	Swimmer (2020)	Pollen (2023)

Singles from Swimmer
- 1. "Runner" Released: November 8, 2019; 2. "Need Your Love" Released: January 9, 2020; 3. "How to Forgive" Released: January 24, 2020

Professional ratings
Aggregate scores
Source	Rating
AnyDecentMusic?	7.5/10
Metacritic	78/100
Review scores
Source	Rating
AllMusic	4/5 stars
Paste	7.8/10
Pitchfork	6.9/10
The Times	4/5 stars
Under the Radar	7.5/10

Swimmer is the fifth studio album by the musical duo Tennis, released via their own label Mutually Detrimental on February 14, 2020.

== Background and release ==
"Runner" was released as the lead single from the album on November 8, 2019. It was released alongside a music video directed by Luca Venter. Along with the release of "Runner", Tennis announced the album would be titled Swimmer, revealing the album cover and a release date of February 14, 2020. Tour dates for 2020 were also announced.

"Need Your Love" was released as the second single from the album on January 9, 2020, alongside a music video directed by Luca Venter.

"How to Forgive" was released as the third single from the album on January 24, 2020, alongside a visualizer directed and edited by Luca Venter.

== Track listing ==
All tracks are written by Alaina Moore and Patrick Riley.

Swimmer track listing
No.	Title	Length
1.	"I'll Haunt You"	2:32
2.	"Need Your Love"	3:51
3.	"How to Forgive"	3:36
4.	"Runner"	3:36
5.	"Echoes"	3:24
6.	"Swimmer"	4:10
7.	"Tender as a Tomb"	2:42
8.	"Late Night"	3:34
9.	"Matrimony II"	3:47
Total length:		31:12

== Personnel ==
Tennis

- Alaina Moore – vocals, keyboards, piano, engineering, production
- Patrick Riley – bass, drum programming, guitar, keyboards, engineering, production

Additional contributors

- Johnny Payne – string arrangements
- Steve Voss – engineering assistance, drums
- Josh Zubot – strings
- Joe LaPorta – mixing
- Claudius Mittendorfer – mixing
- Luca Venter – artwork

== Charts ==
Chart performance for Swimmer
Chart (2020)	Peak position
US Top Album Sales (Billboard)	39
US Indie Store Album Sales (Billboard)	15
US Vinyl Albums (Billboard)	17
