= Cape Dory (album) =

Studio album by Tennis
- Released: January 18, 2011
- Genres: Indie pop, surf pop
- Length: 28:33
- Label: Fat Possum

Tennis chronology
Cape Dory (2011)	Young & Old (2012)

Cape Dory is the debut studio album by American indie pop band Tennis, released on January 18, 2011, on Fat Possum Records.

== Critical reception ==
Professional ratings
Aggregate scores
Source	Rating
Metacritic	76/100
Review scores
Source	Rating
AllMusic	4/5 stars
The A.V. Club	A−
Consequence of Sound	A−
NME	6/10
Paste	8.8/10
Pitchfork	6.2/10
PopMatters	8/10 stars
Prefix	9.0/10

Cape Dory was generally well received. At Metacritic, which assigns a normalized rating out of 100 to reviews from mainstream critics, the album received an average score of 76, based on 24 reviews, which indicates "generally favorable reviews". Cape Dory was listed at number five on Spinner's 40 Best Albums of 2011. No Ripcord placed the album at number 41 on its of Top 50 Albums of 2011, commenting that "for a brief thirty minutes, [Patrick] Riley and [Alania] Moore opt to share a reliable set of savory pop nostalgia."

== Track listing ==
No.	Title	Length
1.	"Take Me Somewhere"	2:48
2.	"Long Boat Pass"	2:59
3.	"Cape Dory"	2:23
4.	"Marathon"	2:45
5.	"Bimini Bay"	3:12
6.	"South Carolina"	2:32
7.	"Pigeon"	3:02
8.	"Seafarer"	3:03
9.	"Baltimore"	2:51
10.	"Waterbirds"	2:59
Total length:		28:33

== Charts ==
Chart (2011)	Peak position
US Billboard 200	135
US Independent Albums (Billboard)	20
US Top Alternative Albums (Billboard)	22
US Top Rock Albums (Billboard)	33
