= Britt Daniel =

American musician

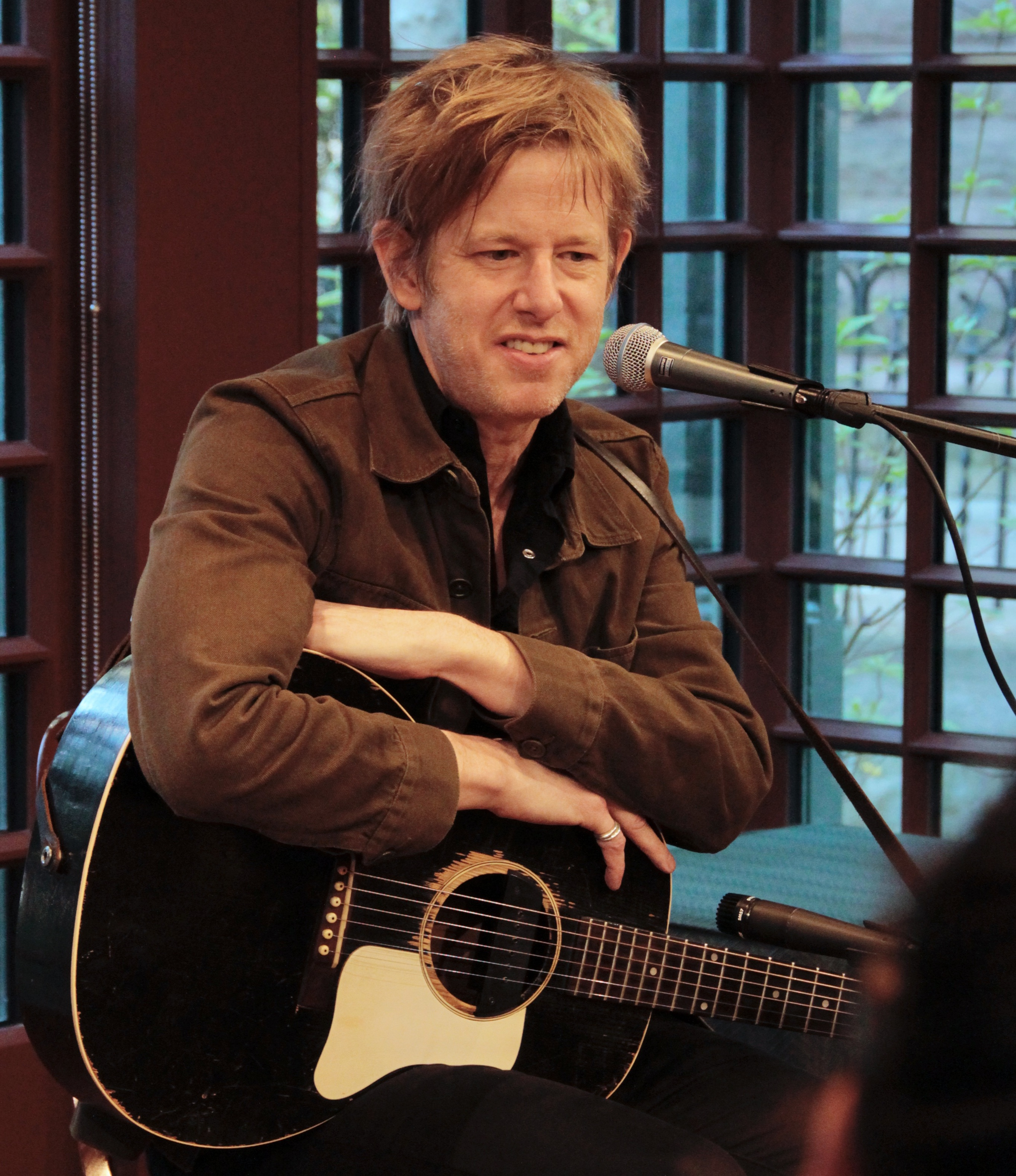
- Daniel in 2023

Background information
- Born: John Britt Daniel; April 14, 1971 (age 55); Galveston, Texas, U.S.
- Genres: Indie rock
- Occupations: Musician; singer; songwriter; record producer
- Instruments: Vocals; guitar; bass guitar; keyboards
- Years active: 1991–present
- Labels: Merge; Peek-A-Boo; Matador; Elektra; Syncretic Records

John Britt Daniel (born April 14, 1971) is an American musician. He is the co-founder, lead singer and guitarist of the indie rock band Spoon, as well as the co-founder, guitarist, bassist, and singer of the band Divine Fits. Daniel also founded numerous other bands in the early 1990s.

== Early life ==
John Britt Daniel was born in Galveston, Texas, and grew up in Temple, Texas, a city about an hour north of Austin. Daniel is the oldest of three children from his parents' marriage. He also has two younger half-siblings. His father, a neurologist, was a fan of the Beatles and the Rolling Stones and a collector of guitars; Daniel himself reportedly picked up the guitar in high school after his college-bound girlfriend ended their relationship.

== Career ==
In 1988, Britt Daniel formed his first band, The Zygotes, while in high school. In 1990, while a student at the University of Texas at Austin, Daniel formed his second band, Skellington, with Travis Hartnett, Mac Stringfellow, "Paul Cannon", and Mike Hurewitz. Skellington recorded and self-released This Town's Gone Dry in 1991, and the Skellington EP was released a year later in 1992. Before breaking up, the band released Skellington Rex, which contained songs that were re-recorded on Spoon's debut album Telephono.

The following year, Daniel joined a three-piece rockabilly band named The Alien Beats with Brad Shenfeld. During a 1993 Alien Beats recording session, computer-chip designer and percussionist Jim Eno was brought in as a substitute drummer, and was later made the permanent drummer. The Alien Beats released a 7" single in May 1993, disbanding soon after.

=== Spoon ===
In 1993, Daniel and ex-Alien Beats drummer Eno, along with guitarist Greg Wilson and bassist Andy McGuire, formed Spoon. Spoon has served as Daniel's primary musical focus.

=== Drake Tungsten ===
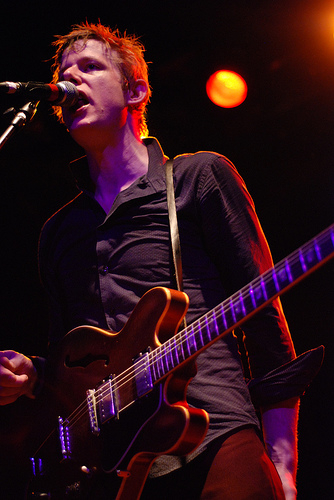
Drake Tungsten (aka Britt Daniel)

Drake Tungsten was the pseudonym which Daniel performed under from 1994 to 1996 as a solo artist. When The Alien Beats disbanded in 1993, he decided to focus his music career on solo material that he had written over the previous years - songs that were more experimental and unfit for the styles of bands that he had previously played. Rather than releasing them under his proper name, Daniel decided to release them under the pseudonym Drake Tungsten. His first such album, Clocking Out Is For Suckers, was released in 1994 on cassette, and was distributed around his home town of Austin, Texas. Two years later, Tungsten released the five-song EP Six Pence for the Sauces on local label Peek-A-Boo Records. Also in 1996, Daniel began working again with drummer Jim Eno (previously from The Alien Beats) and began writing music under the moniker Spoon.

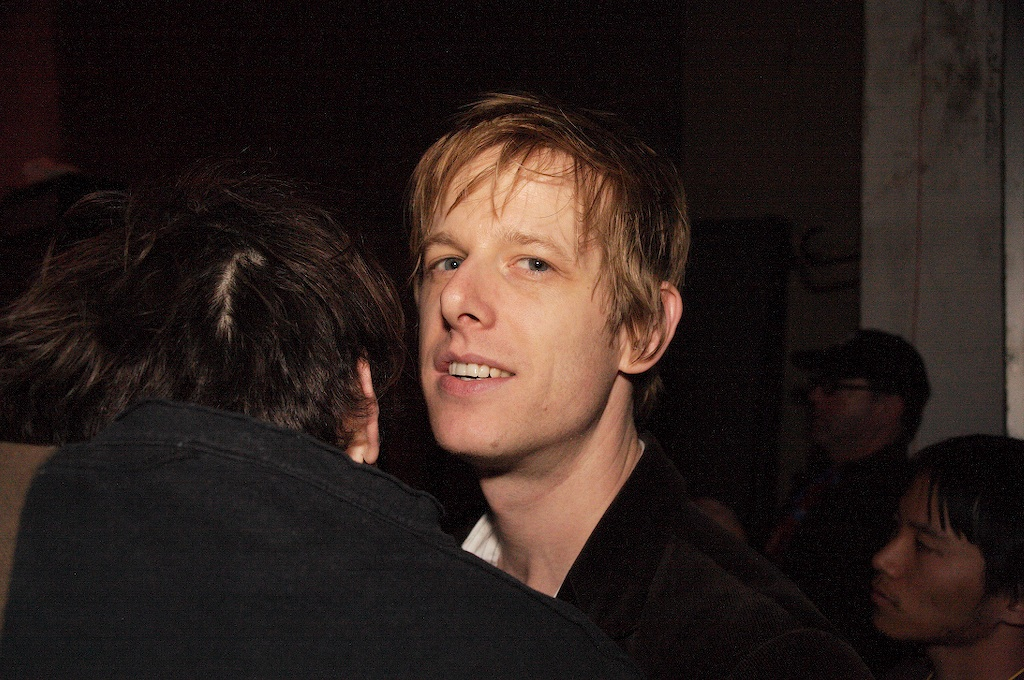
Britt Daniel at SXSW in 2006

=== Divine Fits ===
From 2011 to 2013, Daniel was involved in a new band called Divine Fits, consisting of members from Spoon, Wolf Parade and New Bomb Turks. The group's debut, A Thing Called Divine Fits, was released on August 28, 2012 through Merge Records. The first single from the album, "My Love Is Real", was released on July 10, 2012.

=== Collaborations ===
- In 1999, Daniel played bass for two gigs in the glam rock supergroup Golden Millennium, composed of fellow Peek-A-Boo Records labelmates.
- In 2002, Daniel worked with Bright Eyes on the fourth volume of Post-Parlo's Home Series.
- In 2002, Daniel recorded bass, keyboards and backing vocals on the first Sally Crewe & The Sudden Moves album, "Drive It Like You Stole It" (12XU).
- Daniel has produced songs for the bands I Love You But I've Chosen Darkness and Interpol.
- In 2004, Daniel remixed Interpol's "Slow Hands", which appears on the "Slow Hands" single.
- He previously worked as a sound designer and composer for the computer game company Origin Systems.
- In 2006, Daniel teamed up with Brian Reitzell and helped create some of the original music for the film Stranger Than Fiction.
- He also appeared in the Veronica Mars episode "Rashard and Wallace Go to White Castle", air date February 1, 2006, in which he sang a karaoke version of Elvis Costello's "Veronica".
- In 2009, he produced the White Rabbits album It's Frightening.
- In 2014, he collaborated with Chipotle Mexican Grill on a viral marketing campaign for the album, They Want My Soul.
- In 2015, he collaborated with Austin band Sweet Spirit on the song "Have Mercy" and a cover of Spoon's Paper Tiger.
- On 5 May 2018, Daniel appeared on NPR's news quiz show Wait Wait... Don't Tell Me! for the regular celebrity question segment "Not My Job".
- In 2022, he sings harmonies with Conrad Keely on the song "Growing Divide" by the band ...And You Will Know Us by the Trail of Dead, from the album XI: Bleed Here Now.

== Discography ==
=== Skellington ===
- The Town's Gone Dry (1991) Self-Released
- Skellington EP (1992) Self-Released
- Skellington Rex (1992) Self-Released

=== The Alien Beats ===
- Cavin' In (1993) Syncretic Records

=== Drake Tungsten ===
- Clocking Out Is For Suckers LP (1994, self-released)
- Six Pence for the Sauces EP (1996, Peek-A-Boo Records)
- "Dozy Vs. Drake - Upon Further Consideration" Single (1998, Revival Records)
- A song entitled "This is a Whipping" appeared on the Peek-A-Boo Records 1995 Compilation Bicycle Rodeo Bicycle Rodeo.

=== Golden Millennium ===
- Golden Millennium (1999) Peek-A-Boo Records

=== Spoon ===
- Telephono (1996) Matador Records
- Soft Effects (1997) Matador Records
- A Series of Sneaks (1998) Elektra Records
- The Agony of Laffitte (1998) Saddle Creek
- Love Ways (2000) Merge Records
- Girls Can Tell (2001) Merge Records
- Kill the Moonlight (2002) Merge Records
- Gimme Fiction (2005) Merge Records
- Ga Ga Ga Ga Ga (2007) Merge Records
- Transference (2010) Merge Records
- They Want My Soul (2014) Loma Vista Recordings
- Hot Thoughts (2017) Matador Records
- Lucifer on the Sofa (2022) Matador Records

=== Divine Fits ===
- A Thing Called Divine Fits (2012) Merge Records

=== Solo recordings ===
- Home: Volume IV (2002) Post-Parlo
