= Girls Can Tell =

Studio album by Spoon
- Released: February 20, 2001
- Recorded: 2000
- Studio: Jim Eno's home studio in Austin, Texas
- Genres: Indie pop; art rock
- Length: 36:03
- Labels: Merge; 12XU
- Producers: Britt Daniel; Jim Eno; Mike McCarthy

Spoon chronology
Love Ways (2000)	Girls Can Tell (2001)	Kill the Moonlight (2002)

Singles from Girls Can Tell
- 1. "Anything You Want" Released: 2001; 2. "Everything Hits at Once" Released: September 10, 2001

Girls Can Tell is the third studio album by American indie rock band Spoon. Intended as a stylistic departure from the band's previous work, Girls Can Tell features classic rock and new wave influences absent on their major label albums.

The album was released on Merge Records on February 20, 2001. Spoon frontman Britt Daniel described the album as "a turning point stylistically, and it was a turning point in terms of us being able to put out a record and not feeling like as soon as it came out the wheels fell off the cart."

Girls Can Tell, up to December 2009, has sold slightly fewer than 100,000 copies, according to Nielsen SoundScan.

== Background ==
After the band was dropped from their major record deal with Elektra in August 1998, Spoon finished the first version of Girls Can Tell in May 1999 with ten songs. Spoon frontman Britt Daniel moved to New York for a change of pace from Austin and to work temp jobs while drummer Jim Eno stayed in Austin, designing semiconductor chips. Despite Daniel thinking the album was the band's best, the band's lawyer and manager reported no interest in the record week after week, a personal low point for Daniel. He later described the record as the band's hardest to record, given the emotional toll of his indigence, lack of external interest in the record, and the length of time it took to create. Daniel thought this emotional vulnerability came across in the record. The only interest came from Mike McCarthy, who would come to produce the record's second incarnation, and Matador Records's Gerard Cosloy. The second version reworked "Anything You Want" and "Take a Walk", removed the band's spurned songs about their Elektra A&R rep, and added "Everything Hits at Once", "Believing Is Art", and "10:20 AM".

After writing more songs, Daniel and producer Mike McCarthy returned to Austin and began working on a new album in Eno's garage studio. The band eventually signed with Merge to release the new album, entitled Girls Can Tell.

According to Daniel, Girls Can Tell was intended to be a departure from the band's established style: "The big idea behind Girls Can Tell was to take stock of the band's MO from inception until that point, to carefully consider all the things we'd been trying to do and the way we'd been doing them, and then set out to specifically avoid all of that." He cited the Kinks, the Supremes, and Elvis Costello as inspirations for the album; specifically, Costello's Get Happy!! album, which he had borrowed from his then-girlfriend Eleanor Friedberger.

Daniel saw the album as a last-ditch attempt to find success. He explained:

Girls Can Tell was the Hail Mary pass that absolutely no one thought was gonna find a receiver. It was the record where the colors changed, trains collided, and suddenly we sounded a lot more like us than we'd ever sounded before. At the time it felt like a last chance and it also felt like the last gasp of youth, which seems a little funny now considering how shaped it was by oldies radio.

The track "Me and the Bean" is a cover of a mid-1990s Austin, Texas band called The Sidehackers. The songwriter of The Sidehackers, John Clayton, played bass on Spoon's subsequent album, Kill the Moonlight.

== Reception ==
Professional ratings
Aggregate scores
Source	Rating
Metacritic	85/100
Review scores
Source	Rating
AllMusic	4.5/5 stars
Alternative Press	4/5
Entertainment Weekly	B
Pitchfork	8.0/10
The Rolling Stone Album Guide	4/5 stars
Uncut	4/5 stars
Under the Radar	9/10
The Village Voice	B+

Girls Can Tell saw significant critical acclaim and was heralded for its change in style from the band's previous work. Pitchfork's Nick Mirov said of the album "It's a great thing, hearing a band grow up without losing sight of what made them so vital in the first place; and seeing as how Girls Can Tell might not have ever seen the light of day, it makes it even better. It's worth cherishing."

The A.V. Club commented, "Few outside the band would deny the irony of releasing such a strong album after such an unceremonious major-label dumping." Stereogum's Tom Breihan, on the album's twentieth anniversary, noted, "The album hasn't lost any of that simple but hard-to-describe coolness."

Pitchfork placed Girls Can Tell at number 96 on its list of top 200 albums of the 2000s (decade).

== Track listing ==
All tracks are written by Britt Daniel except where noted.

No.	Title	Length
1.	"Everything Hits at Once"	4:04
2.	"Believing Is Art"	4:19
3.	"Me and the Bean" (John Clayton)	3:33
4.	"Lines in the Suit"	3:47
5.	"The Fitted Shirt"	3:12
6.	"Anything You Want"	2:16
7.	"Take a Walk"	2:26
8.	"1020 AM"	2:10
9.	"Take the Fifth"	3:56
10.	"This Book Is a Movie"	3:33
11.	"Chicago at Night"	2:47
Total length:		36:03

== Personnel ==
Spoon

- Britt Daniel – guitar, voice, keyboards
- Jim Eno – drums
- Joshua Zarbo – bass

Additional musicians

- Conrad Keely – Mellotron on "Everything Hits At Once" and "1020 AM"
- Laura Phelan – vibes on "Everything Hits At Once" and "This Book Is a Movie"
- Lee Spencer – harpsichord on "Fitted Shirt"
- Ames Asbell – viola on "This Book Is a Movie"

Production

- Mike McCarthy – production, engineering
- Britt Daniel – production
- Jim Eno – production, engineering
- John Golden – mastering
- John Croslin – engineering on "Me and the Bean" and "Chicago at Night"
- Craig Ross – mixing on "Chicago at Night"
- Amy Bowman – "spinning record" photo

== Charts ==
Year	Chart	Position
2002	Billboard Top Independent Albums	46
