= The Reivers (band) =

American pop group

- Origin: Austin, Texas, United States
- Genres: Indie rock; alternative rock; pop
- Years active: 1984–1991, 2008–2016
- Labels: DB, Capitol, Dualtone
- Members: John Croslin; Kim Longacre; Cindy Toth; Garrett Williams; Eric Friend

The Reivers were an American pop band from Austin, Texas. Formed in 1984 as Zeitgeist, they were forced to change their name before releasing their second album in 1987, due to another group claiming prior rights to the name. They chose the name The Reivers from the title of the William Faulkner novel.

The band included John Croslin, songwriter, vocalist, guitars; Kim Longacre, vocals, guitars; Cindy Toth, bass, violin; and Garrett Williams, drums. They were the best-known of a cluster of Austin-based bands loosely grouped under the name New Sincerity. Writing for No Depression in 2008, critic Peter Blackstock described The Reivers as "a classic pop band...They balanced memorable melodies and unstoppable energy with seemingly effortless ease, contrasting the rough and sweet vocals of frontfolks John Croslin and Kim Longacre (respectively) amid an infectious swirl of chiming guitars and the unbelievably lively rhythms of drummer Garrett Williams and bassist Cindy Toth."

The band released four albums, all of which received critical praise but not much commercial success, then disbanded in 1991. Croslin worked as producer and engineer on records for a number of bands, notably Spoon and Guided by Voices. Two Reivers songs, "Almost Home" and "Araby," were covered by Hootie and the Blowfish on their 2000 collection Scattered, Smothered and Covered. In 1998, Stereophile critic Robert Baird called The Reivers "one of America's great lost bands."

Croslin later co-founded an Austin band called The Fire Marshals of Bethlehem. In 2005, this band released an album titled Songs for Housework, and Croslin subsequently left the band.

The Reivers reunited in 2008 for occasional performances around Austin. On August 28, 2008, The Reivers played a benefit concert in Austin, and John Croslin announced that the re-formed band would be called Right or Happy. Under the new name, and including keyboardist Eric Friend, the band played at the 2009 South by Southwest. In January 2013 the band (once again calling itself The Reivers) released a new album, their first in more than 20 years.

In July 2017, the band announced on their website that their show in November 2016 would be the last for the foreseeable future, and that they were on "indefinite hiatus". While the band has not broken up, there are no plans to play shows or record for the time being.

== Discography ==
- Zeitgeist (EP, 1984)
- Translate Slowly (1985)
- Saturday (1987)
- End of the Day (1989)
- Pop Beloved (1991)
- Second Story (2013)
