= Jim Eno =

American drummer

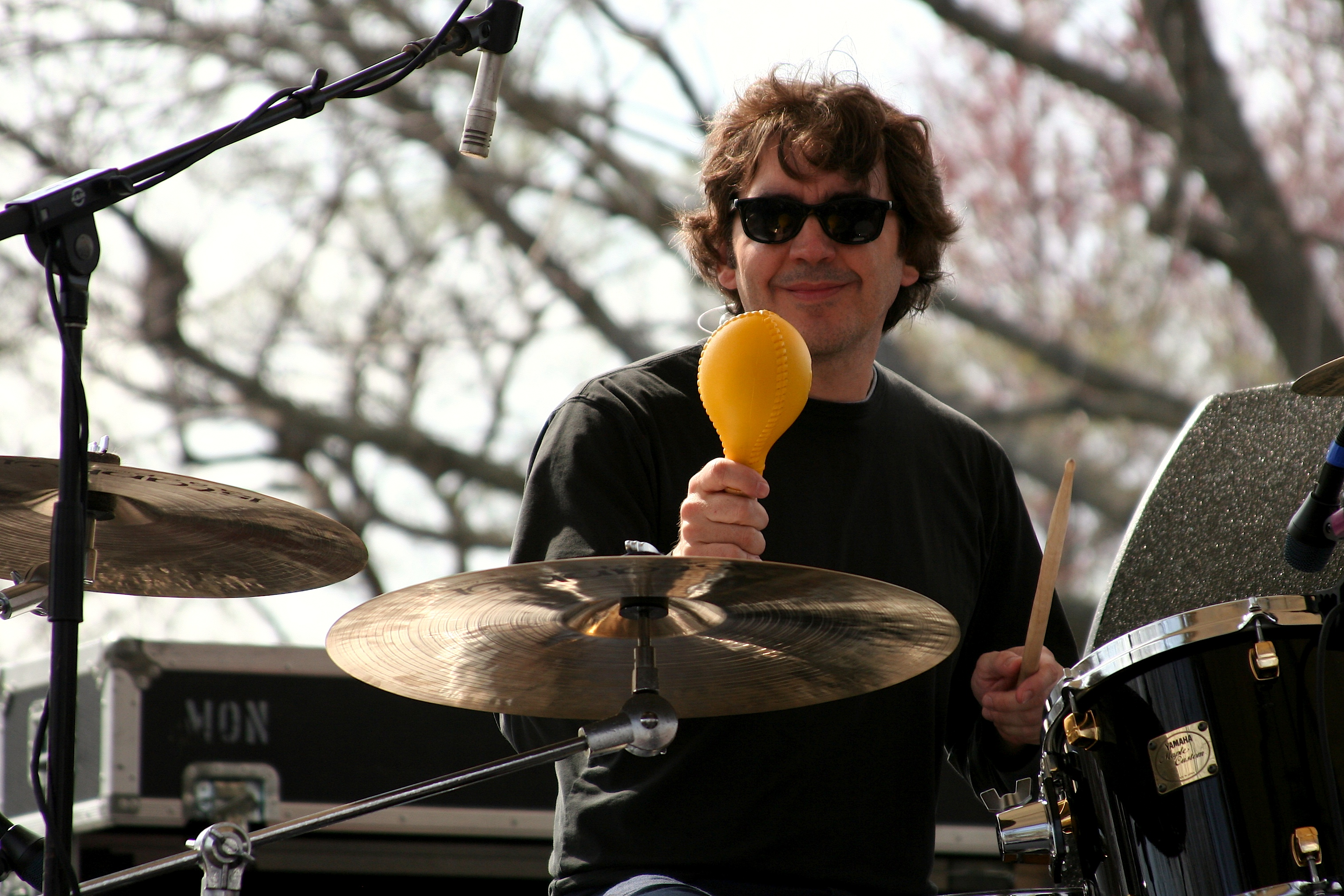
- Eno In 2007

Background information
- Born: February 8, 1966 (age 60); Warwick, Rhode Island, U.S.
- Origin: Austin, Texas
- Genres: Indie rock
- Instrument: Drums
- Years active: 1992–present
- Website: Public Hi-Fi

Jim Eno (born February 8, 1966) is an American drummer and one of the founding members of the Austin, Texas band Spoon. He is also a record producer and a semiconductor chip designer.

== Overview ==
Eno was born in Rhode Island. He studied electrical engineering at North Carolina State University and worked as a hardware design engineer at Compaq Computer Corporation in Houston before moving to Austin in 1992 to design microchips for Motorola. Since joining Spoon he has also worked for Metta Technology as an electrical engineer, but has worked entirely in music since mid-2006.

Eno met the lead singer of Spoon, Britt Daniel, when replacing the drummer of Daniel's former band The Alien Beats. He owns and operates a studio called Public Hi-Fi in Austin, Texas, where the band has often recorded. He has co-produced albums for Spoon and has produced albums for other bands, including !!!, Heartless Bastards, The Relatives and The Strange Boys (discography below). Eno is also an accomplished engineer, working alongside producers Tony Visconti and Steve Berlin. He recently produced two songs for the solo debut of former Voxtrot frontman, Ramesh Srivastava, and mixed all three of the "EP 1" songs.

Starting at the Austin City Limits Festival in 2012 and continuing with SXSW 2013, 2014 and 2015, Jim Eno has been curating exclusive sessions for Spotify. Artists featured include: The Shins, Palma Violets, Father John Misty, The 1975, Phantogram, Poliça, Jagwar Ma, The Hold Steady, Rag'n'Bone Man and more.

He was ranked 31st in Stylus magazine's list of fifty greatest rock drummers.

=== Selected discography ===
Release year	Album	Artist	Role	Citation
2000	Love Ways	Spoon	drums	
2000	Living on the Outside	Eliza Wren		
2001	Girls Can Tell	Spoon	drums; production, engineering	
2002	Kill the Moonlight	Spoon		
2003	Drive It Like You Stole It	Sally Crewe		
2003	Team Boo	Mates of State	additional percussion; production, engineering	
2003	Unite Tonight	Those Peabodys		
2004	Comedy Horn	Zykos		
2004	Home, Vol. 4	Bright Eyes		
2004	Trying to Never Catch Up (Bonus Tracks)	What Made Milwaukee Famous	production, engineering, mixing	
2005	Gimme Fiction	Spoon	drums; production, engineering	
2005	Shortly After Take-Off	Sally Crewe		
2007	Cover Yourself	Blues Traveler	additional percussion; production, engineering, mixing	
2007	The Spirit of Giving - EP	The New Pornographers		
2007	Say Something	Via Audio	toms (track 1); production, mixing, recording	
2007	Ga Ga Ga Ga Ga	Spoon	drums; songwriting (track 6); production, engineering	
2007	Lynn Teeter Flower	Maria Taylor	drums, percussion; production, mixing, recording	
2008	Re-Arrange Us	Mates of State	co-production, recording	
2008	Your Nearest Exit May Be Behind You	Sally Crewe		
2008	Welcome to the Follow Through	Benko		
2008	National Anthem of Nowhere	Apostle of Hustle		
2009	Birds (Song for Multiple Sarcasms)	Diane Birch		
2009	Trepanation Party (Song)	Voxtrot		
2009	Taller Children (Song)	Elizabeth & the Catapult		
2009	Tell 'Em What Your Name Is!	Black Joe Lewis & the Honeybears		
2009	Got Nuffin'	Spoon		
2010	Lay Down (Song)	John Vanderslice		
2010	Animalore	Via Audio	production	
2010	Transference	Spoon	drums; production, additional engineering	
2011	The King EP	Ramesh		
2011	Little Raider EP	Will Johnson		
2011	I'm Alright	Cornell Dupree		
2011	Cover Song - TBD	Gayngs		
2011	Give You the Ghost	Poliça	mixing	
2011	The Orientalist	Daniel Hart		
2011	Scandalous	Black Joe Lewis & the Honeybears		
2011	Love Notes/Letter Bombs	The Submarines		
2011	Live Music	Strange Boys		
2012	Solo - Full Length - TBD	Juston Stens		
2012	Preachers	My Jerusalem		
2012	Oozy	Brownout		
2012	Echoland	Echocentrics		
2012	Natives	Bright Moments		
2012	Self-titled EP	RAMESH		
2012	Nein!	Locas in Love		
2012	Butter	Turbo Fruits		
2012	Big Station	Alejandro Escovedo		
2012	Arrow	Heartless Bastards	production, mixing	
2012	Jim Eno Spotify Sessions	Tennis		
2012	Jim Eno Spotify Sessions	Gardens & Villa		
2012	Jim Eno Spotify Sessions	Father John Misty		
2012	Jim Eno Spotify Sessions	Michael Kiwanuka		
2012	Jim Eno Spotify Sessions	Polica		
2012	Jim Eno Spotify Sessions	The Shins		
2013	Small Sounds EP	Tennis		
2013	"Unofferable" (track)	Half Moon Run		
2013	"Bye Bye 17"	Har Mar Superstar		
2013	Nuestro Camino	Dupree		
2013	The Electric Word	The Relatives		
2013	Dormarion	Telekinesis		
2013	Thr!!!er	!!!	piano (track 1), drums (track 4), organ (track 9)	
2013	Jim Eno Spotify Sessions	Joe Banfi		
2013	Jim Eno Spotify Sessions	Haim		
2013	Jim Eno Spotify Sessions	Palma Violets		
2013	Jim Eno Spotify Sessions	The 1975		
2013	Jim Eno Spotify Sessions	Frank Turner		
2013	Jim Eno Spotify Sessions	Willy Moon		
2014	Shiner (EP)	Mainland		
2014	Palmless (EP)	Dana Falconberry		
2014	Ritual in Repeat	Tennis	drums	
2014	"Tomorrow Is a Long Time"	Phosphorescent	from Sweetheart 2014	
2014	Lies (Track)	Wild Cub		
2014	Jim Eno Spotify Sessions	Phantogram		
2014	Jim Eno Spotify Sessions	Lucius		
2014	Jim Eno Spotify Sessions	Jagwar Ma		
2014	Jim Eno Spotify Sessions	The Hold Steady		
2014	Jim Eno Spotify Sessions	Cody Chesnutt		
2014	Jim Eno Spotify Sessions	Magic Man		
2014	Jim Eno Spotify Sessions	Haerts		
2014	They Want My Soul	Spoon		
2014	Blue Planet Eyes	The Preatures		
2015	The Chase + Haunted By You	Future Islands		
2015	Jim Eno Spotify Sessions	Catfish and the Bottlemen		
2015	Jim Eno Spotify Sessions	Courtney Barnett		
2015	Jim Eno Spotify Sessions	Twin Peaks		
2015	Sorry All Over The Place	The Kickback		
2016	Jim Eno Spotify Sessions	Everything Everything		
2016	From The Forest Came The Fire	Dana Falconberry and Medicine Bow		
2017	Jim Eno Spotify Sessions	Sohn		
2017	Jim Eno Spotify Sessions	Mondo Cozmo		
2017	Jim Eno Spotify Sessions	Spoon		
2017	Jim Eno Spotify Sessions	Rag'n'Bone Man		
