= Merge Records discography =

The following is a list of releases by Merge Records. Merge Records was established in 1989 and released its first album (Tossing Seeds: Singles 1989–91, MRG020) in 1992. By 2012, the label had released more than 450 releases.

Each item in the list includes the artist, the release name, the release medium or media, and (in most cases) the release date.

== 1989–2000 ==
- MRG001 – Bricks – Winterspring – Cassette – 1989
- MRG002 – Wwax – Live / Left – Cassette – 1989
- MRG003 – Metal Pitcher – A Careful Workman Is The Best Safety Device – 7” – 1989
- MRG004 – Superchunk – What Do I b/w My Noise and The Train From Kansas City – 7” – 1989
- MRG005 – Bricks – Girl With The Carrot Skin b/w The Mountain Goes To Mohammed and The Sturgeon – 7” – 1989
- MRG006 – Angels of Epistemology – Angels of Epistemology – 7” – 1990
- MRG007 – Superchunk – Slack Motherfucker b/w Night Creatures – 7” – 1990
- MRG008 – Wwax – Like It Or Not – Double 7” – August, 1990
- MRG009 – Erectus Monotone – Vertigogo b/w En Este Momente and Bakin' Bread – 7” – October, 1990
- MRG010 – Breadwinner – 232 S. Laurel St. – 7” – November, 1990
- MRG012 – Finger – Everywhere b/w Awful Truth – 7” – November, 1990
- MRG013 – Pure – Ballard – 7” – April, 1991
- MRG014 – Superchunk – Cool b/w Fishing – 7” – February, 1991
- MRG015 – Coral – Filling A Hole b/w Your Reward and Snow – 7” – May, 1991
- MRG016 – Erectus Monotone – Cathode Gumshoe – 7” – May, 1991
- MRG017 – Breadwinner – ‘‘ ‘‘ b/w Prescott and Mac's Oranges – 7” – August, 1991
- MRG018 – Superchunk – The Freed Seed – 7” – August, 1991
- MRG019 – Seam – Granny 9X b/w Look Back In Anger – 7” – March, 1992
- MRG020 – Superchunk – Tossing Seeds: Singles 1989–91 – CD/LP/Cassette – April 1, 1992
- MRG021 – Polvo / Erectus Monotone – El Cid – Split 7” – March, 1992
- MRG022 – Polvo – Cor-Crane Secret – CD/LP/Cassette – July 13, 1992
- MRG023 – Drive Like Jehu – Bullet Train To Vegas b/w Hand Over Fist – 7” – April, 1992
- MRG024 – Fuckers – Quick Cash b/w Coming Home – 7” – April, 1992
- MRG025 – Bricks – The Getting Wet Part – 7” – July, 1992
- MRG026 – Honor Role – Purgatory b/w Jank – 7” – August, 1992
- MRG027 – Superchunk – Mower b/w On The Mouth – 7”/CD single – October 19, 1992
- MRG028 – Erectus Monotone – Glider b/w Soul Taker – 7” – October, 1992
- MRG029 – Butterglory – Alexander Bends + 4 – 7” – October, 1992
- MRG030 – Bricks – A Microphone And A Box Of Dirt – CD/Cassette – November 16, 1992
- MRG031 – Angels of Epistemology – Fruit – CD/Cassette – November 16, 1992
- MRG033 – Alf Danielson – Mary Had A Steamboat b/w Glover – 7” – October, 1992
- MRG034 – Superchunk – The Question Is How Fast b/w Forged It & 100,00 Fireflies – 7”/CD Single – January 11, 1993
- MRG035 – Rocket From the Crypt – Pigeon Eater b/w (The) Paste That You Love – 7” – March, 1993
- MRG036 – The Renderers – A Million Lights b/w Primitive Country – 7” – February, 1993
- MRG037 – Pipe – Ashtray b/w Warsaw – 7” – March, 1993
- MRG038 – Polvo – Tilebreaker b/w The Chameleon & Tiara Fetish – 7” – February, 1993
- MRG039 – The 6ths – Heaven In A Black Leather Jacket b/w Rot In The Sun – 7” – March, 1993
- MRG040 – Polvo – Today's Active Lifestyles – CD/LP/Cassette – April 19, 1993
- MRG041 – Honor Role – Album – CD – April 1, 1997
- MRG042 – The Meanies – Rhyming Logic b/w Operator and Darkside Of My Mind – 7” – August, 1993
- MRG043 – The 3Ds – Beautiful Things b/w Summer Stone – 7” – July, 1993
- MRG044 – Erectus Monotone – Close Up – CDEP/12”/Cassette – August 16, 1993
- MRG045 – Coral – Boxtruck b/w Half The Time – 7”October, 1993
- MRG046 – Butterglory – Our Heads – 7” – October, 1993
- MRG047 – Superchunk – Ribbon b/w Who Needs Light – 7” – February, 1994
- MRG048 – Lambchop – Nine b/w Moody Fucker – 7” – February, 1994
- MRG049 – Rocket From the Crypt – UFO, UFO, UFO b/w Birdman – 7” – April, 1994
- MRG050 – Superchunk – Precision Auto Part 2 b/w Precision Auto Part 3 – 7” – April, 1994
- MRG051 – Portastatic – I Hope Your Heart Is Not Brittle – CD/LP/Cassette – February 14, 1994
- MRG052 – Breadwinner – Burner – CDEP/Cassette – March 14, 1994
- MRG52.5 – Breadwinner – Supplementary Cig – 7” – March, 1994
- MRG053 – Archers of Loaf – What Did You Expect? b/w Ethel Merman – 7” – January, 1994
- MRG054 – Pipe – Human Gutterball b/w Figure 8 – 7” – January, 1994
- MRG055 – The Magnetic Fields – The Charm of the Highway Strip – CD/Cassette – April 18, 1994 / LP – May 6, 2008
- MRG056 – Polvo – Celebrate the New Dark Age – CDEP/Cassette/Triple 7” – May 2, 1994 / 12-inch – November 4, 2008
- MRG057 – Squirrel Nut Zippers – Roasted Right – 7”/CDEP – May, 1994
- MRG058 – The Bats – Live at WFMU – 7” – May, 1994
- MRG059 – Superchunk – The First Part – 7”/CD Single – March 14, 1994
- MRG060 – Superchunk – Foolish – CD/LP/Cassette – April 18, 1994 / CD/LP remastered reissue - September 13, 2011
- MRG061 – Velocity Girl – Your Silent Face b/w You're So Good to Me – 7” – May, 1994
- MRG062 – Labradford – Julius b/w Columna de la Independencia – 7” – July 25, 1994
- MRG063 – Odes – Meltaway b/w Honey Gets Hard – 7” – June 20, 1994
- MRG064 – The 3Ds – Hey Seuss b/w River Burial – 7” – March, 1994
- MRG065 – The 3Ds – The Venus Trail – CD/Cassette – May 2, 1994
- MRG066 – Lambchop – Soaky in the Pooper b/w Two Kittens Don't Make a Puppy – 7” – July 25, 1994
- MRG067 – Various Artists – Rows of Teeth – CD/Cassette – July 25, 1994
- MRG068 – Cornershop – Born Disco, Died Heavy Metal + 3 – 7” – November 15, 1994
- MRG069 – Superchunk – Driveway to Driveway – 7”/CDEP – October 24, 1994
- MRG070 – Lambchop – I Hope You're Sitting Down aka Jack's Tulips – CD/Cassette – September 19, 1994
- MRG071 – Butterglory – Crumble – CD/LP/Cassette – October 3, 1994
- MRG072 – The Mad Scene – The Greatest Time EP – 7” – October, 1994
- MRG073 – The Magnetic Fields – All The Umbrellas in London b/w Rats In The Garbage Of The Western World – 7” – October, 1994
- MRG074 – Cornershop – Hold on It Hurts – CD/Cassette – January 23, 1995
- MRG075 – The Magnetic Fields – The Wayward Bus / Distant Plastic Trees – CD/Cassette – January 23, 1995
- MRG076 – East River Pipe – Bring On The Loser – 7” – March, 1995
- MRG077 – The Mad Scene – Sealight – CD – May 8, 1995
- MRG078 – Spent – Songs of Drinking and Rebellion – CD/LP/Cassette – March 6, 1995
- MRG079 – Cakekitchen – Stompin' Thru the Boneyard – CD/Cassette – March 6, 1995
- MRG080 – Portastatic – Scrapbook – CDEP/Double 7” – March 6, 1995
- MRG081 – East River Pipe – Poor Fricky – CD/LP – May 8, 1995
- MRG082 – Guv'ner – Knight Moves – CDEP/Double 7” – June 19, 1995
- MRG083 – Bio Ritmo – Piraguero b/w Asia Minor – 7” – August 29, 1995
- MRG084 – Butterglory – Wait for Me – Double 7” – June 19, 1995
- MRG085 – Superchunk – Incidental Music 1991–95 – CD/Double LP/Cassette – June 20, 1995
- MRG086 – Portastatic – Slow Note from a Sinking Ship – CD/LP – June 20, 1995
- MRG087 – Butterglory – Downed: A Singles Compilation – CD – July 25, 1995
- MRG088 – Verbena – I Say So b/w Silver Queen – 7” – June 20, 1995
- MRG089 – Superchunk – Hyper Enough – 7”/CD Single – August 29, 1995
- MRG090 – Superchunk – Here's Where the Strings Come In – CD/LP/Cassette – September 19, 1995 / CD/LP remastered reissue - April 16, 2011
- MRG091 – The Magnetic Fields – Get Lost – CD – September 19, 1995 / LP – November 4, 2008
- MRG092 – The Wedding Present – Sucker b/w Waiting on the Guns – 7” – October 24, 1995
- MRG093 – The Karl Hendricks Trio – What Everyone Else Calls Fun b/w A Boy Who Plays With Dolls – 7” – October 24, 1995
- MRG094 – The Karl Hendricks Trio – Some Girls Like Cigarettes – CDEP – September 19, 1995
- MRG095 – Polvo – This Eclipse – CDEP – November 14, 1995
- MRG096 – Verbena – Everyday Shoes + 2 – 7” – October 24, 1995
- MRG097 – Lambchop – How I Quit Smoking – CD/Double LP – January 30, 1996
- MRG098 – Butterglory – Are You Building a Temple In Heaven? – CD/LP – February 20, 1996
- MRG099 – Odes – Me and My Big Mouth – CDEP – February 20, 1996
- MRG100 – Various Artists – Merge 100 – CDEP – April 22, 1997
- MRG101 – Cakekitchen – Bald Old Bear – CDEP – January 30, 1996
- MRG102 – Verbena – Pilot Park – CDEP – January 30, 1996
- MRG103 – Neutral Milk Hotel – On Avery Island – CD/LP – March 26, 1996
- MRG104 – Butterglory – She's Got the Akshun! – CD Single – January 30, 1996
- MRG105 – Spent – Revenging b/w Foreign Like a Car – 7” – March 26, 1996
- MRG106 – The Mad Scene – Chinese Honey – CDEP – March 26, 1996
- MRG107 – The Karl Hendricks Trio – For a While, It Was Funny – CD/LP – May 21, 1996
- MRG108 – Lambchop – Hank – CDEP/10” – July 9, 1996
- MRG109 – Guv'ner – The Hunt – CD/LP – August 20, 1996
- MRG110 – East River Pipe – Kill the Action – CD Single – July 30, 1996
- MRG111 – East River Pipe – Mel – CD/LP – September 10, 1996
- MRG112 – Guv'ner – Break a Promise – CD Single – July 30, 1996
- MRG113 – Cakekitchen – The Devil and the Deep Blue Sea – CD – October 1, 1996
- MRG114 – Spent – A Seat Beneath the Chairs – CD/Double LP – October 1, 1997
- MRG115 – Verbena – Souls for Sale – CD/LP – April 1, 1997
- MRG116 – Spent – Umbrella Wars – CD Single – September 10, 1996
- MRG117 – Portastatic – Spying on the Spies b/w Do You Want To Buy A Bridge? – 7” – November 1, 1996
- MRG118 – Superchunk – The Laughter Guns – CDEP – October 22, 1996
- MRG119 – The Third Eye Foundation – Ghost – CD/LP – April 22, 1997
- MRG120 – Portastatic – The Nature of Sap – CD/LP – March 11, 1997
- MRG121 – The Ladybug Transistor – Beverley Atonale – CD/LP – February 11, 1997
- MRG122 – Beatnik Filmstars – Off-White Noize – 7” – May 27, 1997
- MRG123 – Pipe – Slowboy – CD/LP – July 8, 1997
- MRG124 – Lambchop – Cigaretiquette b/w Mr. Crabby – 7” – May 27, 1997
- MRG125 – Beatnik Filmstars – Inhospitalable – CD – September 9, 1997
- MRG126 – Lambchop – Whitey b/w Playboy, The Shit – 7” – July 8, 1997
- MRG127 – The Gothic Archies – The New Despair – CDEP – November 4, 1997
- MRG128 – Superchunk – Watery Hands 7”/CD Single – July 8, 1997
- MRG129 – Superchunk – Indoor Living – CD/LP – September 9, 1997 / CD/LP remastered reissue - February 25, 2014
- MRG130 – Lambchop – Thriller – CD – September 23, 1997
- MRG131 – Shark Quest – Blontzo’s Revenge b/w Pig River Minor – 7” – October 14, 1997
- MRG132 – The Rock*A*Teens – Turn On The Waterworks – 7” – October 14, 1997
- MRG133 – Butterglory – Rat Tat Tat – CD/LP – October 14, 1997
- MRG134 – The Third Eye Foundation – The Sound Of Violence – CDEP – November 25, 1997
- MRG135 – The Karl Hendricks Trio – The Worst Coffee I’ve Ever Had Part II b/w Out On The Weekend – 7” – November 25, 1997
- MRG136 – Neutral Milk Hotel – In the Aeroplane Over the Sea – CD/LP – February 20, 1998
- MRG137 – The Karl Hendricks Trio – Declare Your Weapons – CD/LP – February 20, 1998
- MRG138 – Dynamic Truths – You Take It All b/w Exit Screaming – 7” – April 21, 1998
- MRG139 – Shark Quest – Battle of the Loons – CD – March 10, 1998
- MRG140 – The Rock*A*Teens – Baby, A Little Rain Must Fall – CD – April 21, 1998
- MRG141 – The Ladybug Transistor – Today Knows b/w Massachusetts – 7” – April 21, 1998
- MRG142 – Guv'ner – Spectral Worship – CD – August 11, 1998
- MRG143 – The Magnetic Fields – I Don’t Believe You b/w When I’m Not Looking, You’re Not There – 7” – July 21, 1998
- MRG144 – Pram – The North Pole Radio Station – CD – July 21, 1998
- MRG145 – Beatnik Filmstars – Boss Disque – CD – August 11, 1998
- MRG146 – Lambchop – What Another Man Spills – CD – September 8, 1998
- MRG147 – Ganger – Hammock Style – CD – September 29, 1998
- MRG148 – Superchunk – The Majestic b/w Reg – 7” – February 9, 1999
- MRG149 – The Third Eye Foundation- You Guys Kill Me – CD/LP – October 20, 1998
- MRG150 – Seaweed – Actions and Indications – CD/LP – January 12, 1999
- MRG151 – The Magnetic Fields – Holiday – CD – January 12, 1999 / LP – October 24, 2011
- MRG152 – The Magnetic Fields – The House of Tomorrow – CDEP – January 12, 1999
- MRG153 – Ashley Stove – New Scars – CD – February 9, 1999
- MRG154 – The Ladybug Transistor – The Albemarle Sound – CD/LP – March 23, 1999
- MRG155 – The Rock*A*Teens – Golden Time – CD – March 23, 1999
- MRG156 – Versus – Afterglow – CDEP – February 16, 1999
- MRG157 – Spaceheads – Angel Station – CD – March 23, 1999
- MRG158 – The Music Tapes – First Imaginary Symphony for Nomad – CD/LP – July 6, 1999
- MRG159 – Superchunk – Hello Hawk – CDEP – July 6, 1999
- MRG160 – The Spinanes – Imp Years – CDEP – April 4, 2000
- MRG161 – Various Artists – Oh, Merge: A Merge 10 Year Anniversary Compilation – CD – July 6, 1999
- MRG162 – Superchunk – Superchunk (reissue) – CD – August 10, 1999
- MRG163 – Superchunk – Come Pick Me Up – CD/LP – August 10, 1999
- MRG164 – East River Pipe – The Gasoline Age – CD – August 10, 1999
- MRG165 – Superchunk – No Pocky for Kitty (reissue) – CD – August 10, 1999 / CD/LP remastered reissue - August 17, 2010
- MRG166 – The Magnetic Fields – 69 Love Songs vol. 1 – CD – June 8, 1999
- MRG167 – The Magnetic Fields – 69 Love Songs vol. 2 – CD – June 8, 1999
- MRG168 – The Magnetic Fields – 69 Love Songs vol. 3 – CD – June 8, 1999
- MRG169 – The Magnetic Fields – 69 Love Songs – Triple CD Box Set – June 8, 1999 / 6×10″ box set – April 17, 2010
- MRG170 – Superchunk – On The Mouth (reissue) – CD – August 10, 1999 / CD/LP remastered reissue - August 17, 2010
- MRG171 – ...And You Will Know Us By the Trail Of Dead – Madonna – CD/LP – October 19, 1999
- MRG172 – Ganger – Canopy – CDEP – September 14, 1999

== Since 2000 ==
MRG160 (listed above) was released in 2000

- MRG173 – Superchunk – 1,000 Pounds – CD Single – February 8, 2000
- MRG174 – The Third Eye Foundation – Little Lost Soul – CD – February 8, 2000
- MRG175 – Lambchop – Nixon – CD – February 8, 2000 / Double CD/LP remastered reissue - January 28, 2014
- MRG176 – Versus – Shangri-La – CD Single – April 25, 2000
- MRG177 – Matt Suggs – Golden Days Before They End – CD – June 6, 2000
- MRG178 – Future Bible Heroes – I'm Lonely (And I Love It) – CDEP – July 18, 2000
- MRG179 – Shark Quest – Man on Stilts – CD – August 8, 2000
- MRG180 – Portastatic – De Mel, De Melão – CDEP – May 9, 2000
- MRG181 – The Rock*A*Teens – Sweet Bird of Youth – CD – October 3, 2000
- MRG182 – Paul Burch and the WPA Ballclub – Blue Notes – CD – August 8, 2000
- MRG183 – Spaceheads – Low Pressure – CD – June 4, 2002
- MRG184 – Pram – The Museum of Imaginary Animals – CD – September 5, 2000
- MRG185 – The 6ths – Hyacinths and Thistles – CD – September 5, 2000
- MRG186 – Versus – Hurrah – CD – October 3, 2000
- MRG187 – The Clientele – Suburban Light – CD – April 24, 2001
- MRG188 – The Clean – Getaway – CD – August 21, 2001
- MRG189 – The Ladybug Transistor – Argyle Heir – CD/LP – May 22, 2001
- MRG190 – Portastatic – Looking For Leonard soundtrack – CD – May 22, 2001
- MRG191 – Spoon – Loveways – CDEP – October 17, 2000
- MRG192 – Ashley Stove – All Summer Long – CD – March 23, 2001
- MRG193 – Annie Hayden – The Rub – CD – February 20, 2001
- MRG194 – Pram – Somniloquy – CDEP – August 21, 2001
- MRG195 – Spoon – Girls Can Tell – CD/LP – February 20, 2001 / LP reissue – May 6, 2008
- MRG196 – Paul Burch – Last of My Kind – CD – April 24, 2001
- MRG197 – David Kilgour – A Feather in the Engine – CD – January 22, 2002
- MRG198 – Superchunk – Late Century Dream – CD Single – August 21, 2001
- MRG199 – The Third Eye Foundation – I Poo Poo on Your JuJu – CD – May 22, 2001
- MRG200 – Lambchop – Tools in the Dryer – CD – September 18, 2001
- MRG201 – Superchunk – Here's to Shutting Up – CD/LP – September 18, 2001
- MRG202 – The Clientele – A Fading Summer – CDEP – October 23, 2001
- MRG203 – East River Pipe – Shining Hours In A Can – CD – March 19, 2002
- MRG204 – Lambchop – Is A Woman – CD – February 19, 2002
- MRG205 – Stephin Merritt – Eban And Charley soundtrack – CD – January 22, 2002
- MRG206 – Imperial Teen – On – CD/LP – April 9, 2002
- MRG207 – Superchunk – Art Class – CD5 – April 9, 2002
- MRG208 – Crooked Fingers – Reservoir Songs – CDEP – May 7, 2002
- MRG209 – Radar Brothers – And the Surrounding Mountains – CD – May 7, 2002
- MRG210 – Portastatic featuring Ken Vandermark and Tim Mulvenna – The Perfect Little Door – CDEP – October 23, 2001
- MRG211 – Spoon – A Series of Sneaks – CD reissue – June 4, 2002 / LP reissue – May 6, 2008
- MRG212 – Eric Bachmann – Short Careers: Music From the Film Ball of Wax soundtrack – CD – August 20, 2002
- MRG213 – Spoon – Someone Something + 2 – 7” – July 23, 2002
- MRG214 – The Clientele – Haunted Melody b/w Fear of Falling – 7” – November 5, 2002
- MRG215 – Spoon – Kill the Moonlight – CD/LP – August 20, 2002 / LP reissue – August 3, 2010
- MRG216 – Various Artists – Survive and Advance, Vol. 1 – CD – July 23, 2002
- MRG217 – The Clientele – The Violet Hour – CD – July 8, 2003
- MRG218 – Destroyer – This Night – CD – October 8, 2002 / Double LP – April 20, 2013
- MRG219 – Various Artists – Survive and Advance, Vol. 2 – CD – February 18, 2003
- MRG220 – The Clean – Anthology – Double CD – January 21, 2003
- MRG221 – Superchunk – Cup of Sand – Double CD – August 19, 2003
- MRG222 – Crooked Fingers – Red Devil Dawn – CD – January 21, 2003
- MRG223 – M. Ward – Transfiguration of Vincent – CD – March 18, 2003
- MRG224 – Pram – Dark Island – CD – February 18, 2003
- MRG225 – Portastatic – Summer of the Shark – CD – April 8, 2003
- MRG226 – Matt Suggs – Amigo Row – CD – August 19, 2003
- MRG227 – Buzzcocks – Buzzcocks – CD – March 18, 2003
- MRG228 – The Essex Green – The Long Goodbye – CD – April 8, 2003
- MRG229 – The Ladybug Transistor – The Ladybug Transistor – CD – October 7, 2003
- MRG230 – Superchunk – Crowding Up Your Visual Field – DVD – January 20, 2004
- MRG231 – Various Artists – Survive and Advance, Vol. 3 – CD – July 29, 2003
- MRG232 – Matt Elliott – The Mess We Made – CD – May 6, 2003
- MRG233 – David Kilgour – Frozen Orange – CD – August 24, 2004
- MRG234 – East River Pipe – Garbageheads on Endless Stun – CD – September 9, 2003
- MRG235 – The Rosebuds – The Rosebuds Make Out – CD – October 7, 2003
- MRG236 – Portastatic – Autumn Was a Lark – CDEP – October 7, 2003
- MRG237 – The Karl Hendricks Trio – The Jerk Wins Again – CD – July 29, 2003
- MRG238 – Destroyer – Your Blues – CD – March 9, 2004
- MRG239 – Camera Obscura – Underachievers Please Try Harder – CD – January 20, 2004 / LP – November 4, 2008
- MRG240 – Lambchop – Aw Cmon – CD – February 17, 2004
- MRG241 – Lambchop – No You Cmon – CD – February 17, 2004
- MRG242 – Shark Quest – Gods And Devils – CD – August 24, 2004
- MRG243 – Dinosaur – Dinosaur (reissue) – CD – March 22, 2005
- MRG244 – Dinosaur Jr – You're Living All Over Me (reissue) – CD – March 22, 2005
- MRG245 – Dinosaur Jr – Bug (reissue) – CD – March 22, 2005
- MRG246 – Dinosaur Jr – Chocomel Daze (Live 1987) – LP – November 19, 2012
- MRG248 – Crooked Fingers – Dignity and Shame – CD/Double LP – February 22, 2005
- MRG249 – Richard Buckner – Dents And Shells – CD – October 12, 2004
- MRG250 – Various Artists – Old Enough To Know Better: 15 Years of Merge Records – Triple CD – July 13, 2004
- MRG251 – Radar Brothers – Fallen Leaf Pages – CD – March 22, 2005
- MRG252 – American Music Club – Love Songs for Patriots – CD – October 12, 2004
- MRG253 – Arcade Fire/Alvino Rey Orchestra – Neighborhood #1 (Tunnels) b/w My Buddy – 7” – June 8, 2004
- MRG254 – Lou Barlow – Emoh – CD – January 25, 2005
- MRG255 – Arcade Fire – Funeral – CD/LP – September 14, 2004
- MRG256 – Camera Obscura – Biggest Bluest Hi Fi (reissue) – CD – October 12, 2004
- MRG257 – Lambchop & Hands Off Cuba – CoLAB – CDEP – October 11, 2005
- MRG258 – Destroyer – Notorious Lightning & Other Works – CDEP – January 25, 2005
- MRG259 – The Rosebuds – The Rosebuds Unwind – CDEP – April 12, 2005
- MRG260 – M. Ward – Transistor Radio – CD/LP – February 22, 2005
- MRG261 – Tenement Halls – Knitting Needles and Bicycle Bells – CD – August 23, 2005
- MRG262 – Teenage Fanclub – Man-Made – CD – June 7, 2005
- MRG263 – Portastatic – Bright Ideas – CD – August 23, 2005
- MRG264 – The Rosebuds – Birds Make Good Neighbors – CD – September 13, 2005
- MRG265 – Spoon – Gimme Fiction – CD/LP – May 10, 2005
- MRG266 – Annie Hayden – The Enemy Of Love – CD – September 13, 2005
- MRG267 – The Clientele – Strange Geometry – CD/LP – October 11, 2005
- MRG268 – Destroyer – Destroyer's Rubies – CD – January 24, 2006 / Double LP – April 21, 2012
- MRG269 – Arcade Fire – Arcade Fire – CDEP – July 12, 2005
- MRG270 – Arcade Fire – Miroir Noir – DVD – April 7, 2009
- MRG271 – East River Pipe – What Are You On? – CD – January 24, 2006
- MRG272 – Robert Pollard – From a Compound Eye – CD/Double LP – January 24, 2006
- MRG273 – Spoon – Sister Jack – CD Single – November 8, 2005
- MRG274 – Lambchop – The Decline of Country & Western Civilization Part II: The Woodwind Years – CD – April 11, 2006
- MRG275 – Arcade Fire – Cold Wind – 7” – August 9, 2005
- MRG276 – Camera Obscura – Let's Get Out of This Country – CD/LP – June 6, 2006
- MRG277 – Portastatic – Who Loves the Sun soundtrack – CD – June 6, 2006
- MRG278 – The Essex Green – Cannibal Sea – CD – February 21, 2006
- MRG279 – Richard Buckner – Meadow – CD – September 12, 2006
- MRG280 – M. Ward – Post-War – CD/LP – August 22, 2006
- MRG281 – White Whale – WWI – CD – July 25, 2006
- MRG282 – Robert Pollard – Normal Happiness – CD/LP – October 10, 2006
- MRG283 – Portastatic – Be Still Please – CD – October 10, 2006
- MRG284 – Lambchop – Damaged – CD/LP – August 22, 2006
- MRG285 – Arcade Fire – Neon Bible – CD – March 6, 2007 / Double LP – May 8, 2007
- MRG286 – Camera Obscura – Lloyd, I'm Ready to Be Heartbroken – CD Single – May 9, 2006
- MRG287 – David Kilgour – The Far Now – CD – January 23, 2007
- MRG288 – M. Ward – To Go Home – CDEP – February 20, 2007
- MRG289 – The Broken West – I Can't Go On, I'll Go On – CD – January 23, 2007
- MRG290 – Spoon – Telephono / Soft Effects (reissue) – Double CD – July 25, 2006
- MRG291 – The Ladybug Transistor – Here Comes the Rain – Digital EP – October 31, 2006
- MRG292 – The Ladybug Transistor – Can't Wait Another Day – CD – June 6, 2007
- MRG293 – Portastatic – Sour Shores – Digital EP – September 12, 2006
- MRG294 – The Rosebuds – Night of the Furies – CD – April 10, 2007
- MRG295 – Spoon – Ga Ga Ga Ga Ga – CD/LP – July 10, 2007
- MRG296 – Camera Obscura – If Looks Could Kill – CD Single – January 23, 2007
- MRG297 – The Clientele – God Save The Clientele – CD/LP – May 8, 2007
- MRG298 – M. Ward – "Early Morning Rain" – digital single – April 10, 2007
- MRG299 – David Kilgour – The Before Now: A David Kilgour Retrospective – Digital Album – January 9, 2007
- MRG300 – Arcade Fire – Neon Bible – Deluxe CD – March 6, 2007
- MRG301 – M. Ward – Duet For Guitars #2 (reissue) – CD – July 10, 2007
- MRG302 – Superchunk – Misfits and Mistakes – 7” – June 5, 2007 (Re-release as autographed picture disc on April 17, 2010)
- MRG303 – Big Dipper – Supercluster: The Big Dipper Anthology – Triple CD – March 18, 2008
- MRG304 – Arcade Fire – Keep the Car Running b/w Broken Window – 7” – May 8, 2007
- MRG305 – Oakley Hall – I'll Follow You – CD/LP – September 11, 2007
- MRG306 – Imperial Teen – The Hair the TV the Baby & the Band – CD – August 21, 2007
- MRG307 – Robert Pollard – Coast to Coast Carpet of Love – CD/LP – October 9, 2007
- MRG308 – Caribou – Andorra – CD/LP – August 21, 2007
- MRG309 – American Music Club – The Golden Age – CD – February 19, 2008
- MRG310 – Shout Out Louds – Our Ill Wills – CD/LP – September 11, 2007
- MRG311 – Shout Out Louds – Tonight I Have to Leave It – CDEP – June 5, 2007
- MRG312 – Caribou – Melody Day – CD Single – July 10, 2007
- MRG313 – Arcade Fire / LCD Soundsystem – Poupée De Cire, Poupée De Son b/w No Love Lost – Split 7” – September, 2007
- MRG314 – Arcade Fire / Calexico – Intervention b/w Ocean of Noise – Split 7” – July 10, 2007
- MRG315 – Radar Bros – Auditorium – CD – January 29, 2008
- MRG316 – Arcade Fire – No Cars Go b/w Surf City Eastern Bloc – 7” – September 11, 2007
- MRG317 – Robert Pollard – Standard Gargoyle Decisions – CD/LP – October 9, 2007
- MRG318 – The Clientele – Bookshop Casanova – Digital Single – August 28, 2007
- MRG319 – Destroyer – Trouble in Dreams – CD/Double LP – March 18, 2008
- MRG320 – Spoon – Don't You Evah – CDEP – April 8, 2008
- MRG321 – Wye Oak – If Children – CD – April 8, 2008
- MRG322 – The Ladybug Transistor – Always On The Saxophone – Digital Single – October 9, 2007
- MRG323 – M. Ward – Hold Time – CD/LP – February 17, 2009
- MRG324 – She & Him – Volume One – CD/LP – March 18, 2008
- MRG325 – The Clean – Mister Pop – CD – September 8, 2009
- MRG326 – Destroyer – Bay of Pigs b/w Ravers – 12-inch Single – August 18, 2009
- MRG327 – Caribou – She's The One – Digital Single – August 21, 2007
- MRG328 – The Rosebuds – Sweet Beats, Troubled Sleep (Night of the Furies Remixed) – Digital Album – April 10, 2008
- MRG329 – The Broken West – Now or Heaven – CD – September 9, 2008
- MRG330 – Julian Koster – The Singing Saw at Christmastime – CD/LP – October 7, 2008
- MRG331 – Shout Out Louds – Impossible – CD Single – April 8, 2008
- MRG332 – Lou Barlow – Goodnight Unknown – CD – October 6, 2009
- MRG333 – Portastatic – Some Small History – Double CD – September 9, 2008
- MRG334 – The Rosebuds – Life Like – CD/LP – October 7, 2008
- MRG335 – Lambchop – Ohio – CD – October 7, 2008
- MRG336 – Volcano Suns – The Bright Orange Years (reissue) – CD – January 27, 2009
- MRG337 – Volcano Suns – All-Night Lotus Party (reissue) – CD – January 27, 2009
- MRG338 – The Music Tapes – Music Tapes for Clouds and Tornadoes – CD/LP – August 19, 2008
- MRG339 – Richard Buckner – Our Blood – CD/LP – August 2, 2011
- MRG340 – Conor Oberst – Conor Oberst – CD/LP – August 5, 2008
- MRG341 – Conor Oberst – Gentleman's Pact – EP – May 5, 2009
- MRG342 – East River Pipe – We Live in Rented Rooms – CD – February 15, 2011
- MRG343 – Arcade Fire – Miroir Noir – Deluxe DVD – April 7, 2009
- MRG344 – Telekinesis – Telekinesis! – CD – April 7, 2009 / LP reissue – August 20, 2013
- MRG345 – Spoon – Got Nuffin – CDEP/12" EP – June 30, 2009
- MRG346 – Wye Oak – The Knot – CD – July 21, 2009 / LP – October 24, 2011
- MRG347 – The Clientele – Bonfires on the Heath – CD/LP – October 6, 2009
- MRG348 – Caribou – Swim – CD/LP – April 20, 2009
- MRG349 – Conor Oberst and the Mystic Valley Band – Outer South – CD/Double LP – May 5, 2009
- MRG350 – Various Artists – SCORE! – Box Set – 2009
- MRG351 – Various Artists – SCORE! 20 Years of Merge Records: The Covers! – CD – April 7, 2009
- MRG352 – Various Artists – SCORE! 20 Years of Merge Records: The Remixes! – CD – November 17, 2009
- MRG354 – She & Him – Volume Two – CD/LP – March 23, 2010
- MRG355 – Richard Buckner – Bloomed (reissue) – Digital Album – March, 2009 / Double CD/LP remastered reissue - March 18, 2014
- MRG356 – Richard Buckner – The Hill (reissue) – Digital Album – March 3, 2009
- MRG357 – Richard Buckner – Impasse (reissue) – Digital Album – March 3, 2009
- MRG358 – Superchunk – Leaves In The Gutter – CDEP – April 7, 2009
- MRG359 – Superchunk – Crossed Wires b/w Blinders – 7-inch – July 7, 2009
- MRG360 – Polvo – In Prism – CD/Double LP – September 8, 2009
- MRG363 – Radar Bros. – The Illustrated Garden – CD – March 23, 2010
- MRG364 – She & Him – In the Sun b/w I Can Hear Music – 7-inch – February 23, 2010
- MRG365 – Spoon – Transference – CD/LP – January 19, 2010
- MRG366 – The Love Language – Libraries – CD/LP – July 13, 2010
- MRG367 – Various Artists – Stroke: Songs for Chris Knox – Double CD – February 23, 2010
- MRG368 – The Music Tapes – Mary's Voice – CD/LP – September 4, 2012
- MRG369 – Destroyer – Kaputt – CD/Double LP – January 25, 2011
- MRG370 – Shout Out Louds – Work – CD – February 23, 2010
- MRG371 – Destroyer – City of Daughters (reissue) – CD – March 23, 2010
- MRG372 – Destroyer – Thief (reissue) – CD – March 23, 2010
- MRG373 – Destroyer – Streethawk: A Seduction (reissue) – CD/LP – March 23, 2010
- MRG374 – Let's Wrestle – In the Court of the Wrestling Let's – CD – March 23, 2010
- MRG375 – Lambchop – Live at XX Merge – CD – November 17, 2009
- MRG376 – Spoon – Written in Reverse b/w Mean Red Spider – 7-inch – January 12, 2010
- MRG377 – The Ladybug Transistor – Clutching Stems – CD – June 7, 2011
- MRG378 – Versus – On the Ones and Threes – CD/Double LP – August 3, 2010
- MRG379 – Tracey Thorn – Love and Its Opposite – CD – May 18, 2010
- MRG380 – Superchunk – Majesty Shredding – CD/LP – September 14, 2010
- MRG381 – Shout Out Louds – Fall Hard – Digital Single – February 2, 2010
- MRG382 – Telekinesis – Dirty Thing b/w Non Toxic and "Drawback – 7-inch – April 17, 2010
- MRG383 – Portastatic – Make It Sound In Tune – Digital EP – December 22, 2009
- MRG384 – The Rosebuds – Loud Planes Fly Low – CD/LP – June 7, 2011
- MRG385 – Arcade Fire – The Suburbs – CD/Double LP – August 2, 2010
- MRG386 – Let's Wrestle / The Love Language – Brittany's Back b/w I'm So Lazy – Split 7” – April 17, 2010
- MRG388 – Wye Oak – My Neighbor / My Creator - CDEP – March 12, 2010 / 12-inch – November 19, 2012
- MRG389 – Tracey Thorn – Oh, the Divorces! b/w Taxi Cab – Digital Single – April 19, 2010
- MRG390 – Superchunk – Digging For Something b/w February Punk – 7-inch – July 13, 2010
- MRG391 – Fucked Up – Year of the Ox – 12-inch – September 28, 2010
- MRG392 – Teenage Fanclub – Shadows – CD – June 8, 2010
- MRG393 – Arcade Fire – The Suburbs b/w Ready to Start – 12-inch EP – May 27, 2010
- MRG394 – Telekinesis – 12 Desperate Straight Lines – CD/LP – February 15, 2011
- MRG395 – Apex Manor – The Year of Magical Drinking – CD – January 25, 2011
- MRG396 – Lou Barlow + Missingmen – Too Much Freedom = Sentridoh III – Digital EP – June 7, 2010
- MRG397 – The Clientele – Minotaur – CDEP – August 31, 2010
- MRG398 – Various Artists – Merge Records 2010 Digital Sampler – Digital Album – May 4, 2010
- MRG399 – Tracey Thorn – Why Does the Wind? – Digital EP – June 15, 2010
- MRG400 – Wye Oak – Civilian – CD/LP – March 8, 2011
- MRG401 – Destroyer – Archer on the Beach b/w Grief Point – 12-inch single – November 2, 2010
- MRG402 – Telekinesis – Parallel Seismic Conspiracies – CDEP – October 26, 2010
- MRG403 – Let's Wrestle – Getting Rest b/w When I Was in the Hospital – Digital Single – September 7, 2010
- MRG404 – She & Him – Thieves b/w I Knew It Would Happen This Way – 7-inch – August 31, 2010
- MRG405 – The Mountain Goats – All Eternals Deck – CD/LP – March 29, 2011
- MRG406 – The Extra Lens – Undercard – CD/LP – October 19, 2010
- MRG407 – She & Him – I Put a Spell On You – Digital Single – December 7, 2010
- MRG408 – Caribou – Swim Remixes – 12-inch EP / Digital Album – October 26, 2010
- MRG409 – Tracey Thorn – Opposites – Digital EP – August 31, 2010
- MRG410 – Polvo – Siberia – CD/LP – September 30, 2013
- MRG411 – Wild Flag – Wild Flag – CD/LP – September 13, 2011
- MRG412 – Wild Flag – Future Crimes b/w Glass Tambourines – 7-inch – April 16, 2011
- MRG413 – Jonny – Jonny – CD – April 12, 2011
- MRG414 – Let's Wrestle – Nursing Home – CD/LP – May 17, 2011
- MRG415 – Archers of Loaf – Icky Mettle (Remastered) (reissue) – Double-CD/LP – August 2, 2011
- MRG416 – Superchunk / Coliseum – Horror Business b/w Bullet – split 7-inch – April 16, 2011
- MRG417 – Amor de Días – Street of the Love of Days – CD/LP – May 17, 2011
- MRG418 – Times New Viking – Dancer Equired – CD/LP – April 26, 2011
- MRG419 – David Kilgour & the Heavy Eights – Left by Soft – CD – April 26, 2011
- MRG420 – Arcade Fire – Scenes from the Suburbs – Double-CD and DVD – May 17, 2011
- MRG421 – Eleanor Friedberger – Last Summer – CD/LP – July 12, 2011
- MRG422 – Tracey Thorn – You Are a Lover – Digital EP – April 25, 2011
- MRG423 – Imperial Teen – Feel the Sound – CD/LP – January 31, 2012
- MRG424 – She & Him – A Very She & Him Christmas – CD/LP – October 25, 2011
- MRG425 – Archers of Loaf – Vee Vee (Remastered) (reissue) – Double CD/LP – February 21, 2012
- MRG426 – The Music Tapes – Purim's Shadows (The Dark Tours the World) – Kazoo and Digital EP – June 14, 2011
- MRG427 – Polvo – Heavy Detour b/w Anchoress – 7-inch – July 26, 2011
- MRG428 – Crooked Fingers – Breaks in the Armor – CD/LP – October 11, 2011
- MRG430 – Stephin Merritt – Obscurities – CD/LP – August 23, 2011
- MRG431 – Hospitality – Hospitality – CD/LP – January 31, 2012
- MRG432 – Wye Oak – Strangers b/w Mother – 7-inch – November 21, 2011
- MRG433 – M. Ward – A Wasteland Companion – CD/LP – April 10, 2012
- MRG434 – Lambchop – Mr. M – CD/Double LP – February 21, 2012
- MRG435 – Archers of Loaf – All the Nation's Airports (Remastered) (reissue) – Double CD/LP – August 7, 2012
- MRG436 – The Love Language – Ruby Red – CD/LP – July 23, 2013
- MRG437 – Tracey Thorn – Night Times – Digital EP – November 1, 2011
- MRG438 – Tracey Thorn – Extended Plays 2010-2011 – Digital Album – November 8, 2011
- MRG439 – The Magnetic Fields – Love at the Bottom of the Sea – CD/LP – March 6, 2012
- MRG440 – The Magnetic Fields – Andrew in Drag b/w When Next In Love I Fall – 7-inch – January 31, 2012
- MRG441 – The Barren Girls – Hell Hymns – 7-inch – April 2, 2013
- MRG442 – Arcade Fire – Sprawl II (Mountains Beyond Mountains) b/w Ready to Start (Remixed By Damain Taylor and Arcade Fire) – 12-inch EP – April 21, 2012
- MRG443 – Richard Buckner – Willow b/w Lost – 7-inch – April 21, 2012
- MRG444 – Telekinesis – Dormarion – CD/LP – April 2, 2013
- MRG445 – Archers of Loaf – White Trash Heroes (Remastered) (reissue) – Double CD/LP – August 7, 2012
- MRG446 – The Mountain Goats – Transcendental Youth – CD/LP – October 2, 2012
- MRG447 – Eleanor Friedberger – Personal Record – CD/LP – June 4, 2013
- MRG448 – M. Ward – Primitive Girl b/w The Twist and Roll Over Beethoven – 7-inch – April 12, 2012
- MRG449 – Superchunk – This Summer b/w Last Summer – 7-inch – June 12, 2012
- MRG450 – Bob Mould – The Silver Age – CD/LP – September 4, 2012
- MRG451 – Sugar – Copper Blue / Beaster (reissue') – Triple CD/Double LP – July 24, 2012
- MRG452 – Sugar – Beaster (reissue) – Digital EP – July 24, 2012
- MRG453 – Sugar – File Under: Easy Listening (reissue) – Double CD/Double LP – July 24, 2012
- MRG454 – Redd Kross – Researching the Blues – CD/LP – August 7, 2012
- MRG455 – Divine Fits – A Thing Called Divine Fits – CD/LP – August 28, 2012
- MRG456 – Mount Moriah – Mount Moriah – LP – October 2, 2012
- MRG457 – Divine Fits – My Love Is Real b/w I Was Born in a Laundromat – 7-inch – July 31, 2012
- MRG458 – Various Artists – Merge Records Sampler 2012 – CD – May 29, 2012
- MRG459 – Tracey Thorn – Tinsel and Lights – CD/LP – October 30, 2012
- MRG460 – Shout Out Louds – Optica – CD/LP – February 26, 2013
- MRG461 – Hospitality – Monkey b/w The Drift – 7-inch – October 30, 2012
- MRG462 – Mark Eitzel – Don't Be a Stranger – CD/LP – October 2, 2012
- MRG463 – Radar Bros. – Eight – LP – January 29, 2013
- MRG464 – Coco Hames – Coco Hames – CD/LP – March 31, 2017
- MRG465 – William Tyler – Impossible Truth – CD/Double LP – March 19, 2013
- MRG466 – Mount Moriah – Miracle Temple – CD/LP – February 26, 2013
- MRG467 – Amor de Días – The House at Sea – CD/LP – January 29, 2013
- MRG468 – Flock of Dimes – Curtain b/w Apparition – 7-inch – September 25, 2012
- MRG469 – The Mountain Goats – Steal Smoked Fish b/w In the Shadow of the Western Hills – 7-inch – October 2, 2012
- MRG470 – Reigning Sound – Falling Rain – CD/LP – July 15, 2014
- MRG471 – Hospitality – Trouble – CD/LP – January 28, 2014
- MRG472 – Future Bible Heroes – Partygoing – CD – June 4, 2013
- MRG473 – Future Bible Heroes – Memories of Love, Eternal Youth, and Partygoing. – Quadruple CD/Triple LP – June 4, 2013
- MRG474 – She & Him – Volume 3 – CD/LP/Cassette – June 4, 2013
- MRG475 – Mikal Cronin – MC II – CD/LP – June 4, 2013
- MRG476 – Mount Moriah – Rdio Session – Digital Album – May 28, 2013
- MRG477 – Various Artists – Merge Records Sampler Winter 2012 – CD – October 2, 2012
- MRG478 – Daphni – Jiaolong – CD/Double LP – October 16, 2012
- MRG479 – Superchunk – Me and You and Jackie Mittoo b/w Sunset Arcade – 7-inch – July 23, 2013
- MRG480 – Superchunk – I Hate Music – CD/LP – August 20, 2013
- MRG481 – The Mountain Goats – All Hail West Texas – CD/LP – June 4, 2013
- MRG482 – Telekinesis – Ghosts and Creatures (demo) – flexi 7-inch – April 2, 2013
- MRG483 – David Kilgour & the Heavy Eights – Columbus b/w Shifting Sands – 7-inch – June 25, 2013
- MRG484 – Arcade Fire – Reflektor – 12-inch – September 9, 2013
- MRG485 – Arcade Fire – Reflektor – Double CD/Double LP – October 29, 2013
- MRG486 – King Khan & The Shrines – Idle No More – CD/LP – September 3, 2013
- MRG488 – Caribou – "Our Love" - CD/LP - October 7, 2014
- MRG489 – Tracey Thorn – Joy – Digital Single – December 10, 2012
- MRG490 – Superchunk – Void b/w Faith – 7-inch – April 20, 2013
- MRG491 – Saint Rich – Beyond the Drone – CD/LP - September 30, 2013
- MRG492 – Teenage Fanclub – CD/LP – September 9, 2016
- MRG493 – Various Artists – Merge Records 2013 Summer Sampler – CD – July 1, 2013
- MRG494 – Vertical Scratchers – Daughter of Everything – CD/LP – February 25, 2014
- MRG495 – Ex Hex – Hot and Cold b/w Waterfall and Everywhere – 7-inch – March 18, 2014
- MRG496 – Shout Out Louds – Rdio Session – Digital Album – June 25, 2013
- MRG497 – Divine Fits – Chained to Love b/w Ain't That the Way – 12-inch – July 23, 2013
- MRG498 – Destroyer – Five Spanish Songs – 12-inch/CDEP – November 29, 2013
- MRG499 – Richard Buckner – Surrounded – CD/LP - September 3, 2013
- MRG500 – Various Artists – Or Thousands of Prizes – CD – December 2014
- MRG501 – Mikal Cronin / Superchunk – "Take It Easy" b/w "Good Morning" – 7-inch – December 2014
- MRG502 – Mount Moriah / The Mountain Goats – "Revolution Blues" b/w "Shot In The Dark" – 7-inch – December 2014
- MRG503 – The Clientele – "Falling Asleep" b/w "Orpheus Avenue" – 7-inch – December 2014
- MRG504 – King Khan & The Shrines / Destroyer – "Know Your Product" b/w "Te Recuerdo Amanda" – 7-inch – December 2014
- MRG505 – Lambchop / Hospitality – "FA-Q" b/w "Inauguration (Super Timeline Version)" – 7-inch – December 2014
- MRG506 – Wye Oak / Telekinesis! – "Better" b/w "Sebastian" – 7-inch – December 2014
- MRG507 – Redd Kross / Vertical Scratchers – "Leave It Where You Found It" b/w "Jackie's Favorite" – 7-inch – December 2014
- MRG508 – East River Pipe / Reigning Sound – "Did The Bank Boys Fool Ya?" b/w "Falling Rain (Acoustic)" – 7-inch – December 2014
- MRG509 – Eleanor Friedberger / Spoon – "Open Your Soul To Me" b/w "Waiting To Know You" – 7-inch – December 2014
- MRG510 – Hiss Golden Messenger / Matt Suggs – "Rock Holy" b/w "This Is My Light" – 7-inch – December 2014
- MRG511 – Crooked Fingers / Spider Bags – "Western Line" b/w "Into A Tree" – 7-inch – December 2014
- MRG512 – Ex Hex / Twerps – "All Kindsa Girls" b/w "Science" – 7-inch – December 2014
- MRG513 – Various Artists – Or Thousands of Prizes, The Covers – EP – December 2014
- MRG514 – She & Him – The Capitol Studio Sessions – Digital EP – December 2, 2013
- MRG515 – Wye Oak – Shriek – CD/LP – April 29, 2014
- MRG516 – The Mountain Goats – Beat the Champ – CD/LP – April 7, 2015
- MRG517 – The Love Language – Black Mt. Demos – Cassette – July 23, 2013 / Digital Album – October 8, 2013
- MRG518 – William Tyler – Lost Colony – 12-inch – April 29, 2014
- MRG519 – David Kilgour and the Heavy Eights – End Times Undone – CD/LP – August 5, 2014
- MRG520 – Bob Mould – Beauty & Rain – CD/LP – June 3, 2014
- MRG521 – Spider Bags – Frozen Letter – CD/LP – August 5, 2014
- MRG522 – Flesh Wounds – "Bitter Boy" b/w "Kennel Cough" and "Let Me Be Clear" – 7-inch – May 13, 2014
- MRG523 – Hiss Golden Messenger – Lateness of Dancers – CD/LP – September 9, 2014
- MRG524 – Various Artists – M-25 Sampler – CD – May 2014
- MRG525 – Ex Hex – Rips – CD/LP – October 7, 2014
- MRG526 – Hiss Golden Messenger – "Brother, Do You Know The Road" – Digital single – May 14, 2014
- MRG527 – Titus Andronicus – The Most Lamentable Tragedy – CD/LP – July 28, 2015
- MRG528 – Twerps – Underlay EP – Digital – August 19, 2014
- MRG529 – Superchunk & Eleanor Friedberger – "Oh Oh I Love Her So" b/w "Free Money" – 7-inch – July 25, 2014
- MRG530 – HeCTA – The Diet – CD/LP – September 18, 2015
- MRG532 – Twerps – Back To You" b/w "Always Waiting" – 7-inch – November 4, 2014
- MRG533 – M. Ward – More Rain – CD/LP – March 4, 2016
- MRG534 – Lambchop – FLOTUS – CD/LP – November 4, 2016
- MRG535 – William Tyler – Deseret Canyon (Reissue) – LP – April 18, 2015
- MRG536 – Mount Moriah – How to Dance – CD/LP – February 26, 2016
- MRG537 – Little Scream – Cult Following – CD/LP – May 6, 2016
- MRG538 – Twerps – Range Anxiety – CD/LP – January 27, 2015
- MRG539 – Mike Krol – Turkey – CD/LP – August 28, 2015
- MRG540 – Will Butler – Policy – CD/LP – March 10, 2015
- MRG542 – Various Artists – Fall Sampler 2014 – CD – September 2014
- MRG543 – Hiss Golden Messenger – Southern Grammar – 12-inch – February 3, 2015
- MRG544 – Telekinesis – Ad Infinitum – CD/LP – September 18, 2015
- MRG545 – William Tyler – Modern Country – CD/LP – June 3, 2016
- MRG546 – The Mountain Goats – "Blood Capsules" b/w "Dub Capsules – 12-inch – May 19, 2015
- MRG548 – Eric Bachmann – Eric Bachmann – CD/LP – March 25, 2016
- MRG549 – Waxahatchee – Ivy Tripp – CD/LP – April 7, 2015
- MRG550 – Mikal Cronin – MCIII – CD/LP/Cassette – May 4, 2015
- MRG551 – Benji Hughes – "Songs in the Key of Animals" – CD/LP – January 29, 2016
- MRG552 – Various Artists – Spring-Summer Sampler 2015 – CD – April 2015
- MRG553 – The Clientele – Alone and Unreal: The Best of the Clientele – LP – September 4, 2015
- MRG554 – Mac McCaughan – "Box Batteries" b/w "Whatever Light" – 7-inch – April 7, 2015
- MRG555 – Mac McCaughan – Non-Believers – CD/LP – May 4, 2015
- MRG556 – Benji Hughes – "Shark Attack" b/w "Mama, I'm a Zombie" – 7-inch – October 9, 2015
- MRG557 – Benji Hughes – "Freaky Feedback Blues" b/w "Jazz x 10-inch – 7-inch – October 9, 2015
- MRG558 – Various Artists – Fall Sampler 2015 – CD – September 2015
- MRG560 – Crooked Fingers – Crooked Fingers (Reissue) – CD/LP – January 29, 2016
- MRG561 – Crooked Fingers – Bring On the Snakes (Reissue) – CD/LP – January 29, 2016
- MRG562 – A Giant Dog – Pile – CD/LP – May 6, 2016
- MRG564 – Wye Oak – Tween – CD/LP – August 5, 2016
- MRG565 – Spoon – Gimmie Fiction (Deluxe Reissue) – CD/LP – December 11, 2015
- MRG566 – Mount Moriah – "Calvander" and "Baby Blue (Garage Demo)" b/w "Plane (Live)" – 7-inch – October 9, 2015
- MRG567 – King Khan & The Shrines – "Children of the World" b/w "Gone Are the Times" – 7-inch – June 3, 2016
- MRG568 – Various Artists – 2016 Spring-Summer Sampler – CD – May 2015
- MRG569 – Destroyer – Poison Season – CD/LP – August 28, 2015
- MRG570 – Destroyer – "Forces From Above (Remix)" b/w "Times Square, Poison Season" – 12-inch – August 28, 2015
- MRG571 – Destroyer – "My Mystery" b/w "My Mystery (DJ johnedwardcollinsgmail.com remix)" – 7-inch – May 6, 2016
- MRG572 – Titus Andronicus – S+@dium Rock – LP – July 29, 2016
- MRG573 – Waxahatchee – Early Recordings – Cassette – June 17, 2016
- MRG574 – Will Butler – Friday Night – CD/LP – June 17, 2016
- MRG575 – Hiss Golden Messenger – Heart Like a Levee – CD/LP – October 7, 2016
- MRG577 – Sneaks – Gymnastics (Reissue) – CD/LP – September 9, 2016
- MRG578 – Sneaks – It's A Myth – CD – March 31, 2017
- MRG579 – The Mountain Goats – Goths – CD – Release Date May 19, 2017
- MRG580 – Bob Mould – Patch The Sky – CD/LP – March 25, 2016
- MRG581 – Bob Mould – Live from Studio X – CD – April 16, 2016
- MRG582 – Mark Eitzel – Hey Mr Ferryman – CD/LP – January 27, 2017
- MRG584 – Allison Crutchfield – Tourist in This Town – CD/LP/Cassette – January 27, 2017
- MRG585 – Ibibio Sound Machine – Uyai – CD/LP – March 3, 2017
- MRG587 – Various Artists – Fall Sampler 2016 – CD – September 2016
- MRG588 – Hollie Cook – Vessel of Love – CD/LP – January 26, 2018
- MRG589 – Mike Krol – Mike Krol Is Never Dead: The First Two Records – 2×LP/CD – July 14, 2017
- MRG590 – Hollie Cook – "Superstar" – 7-inch – April 22, 2017
- MRG592 – A Giant Dog – Toy – CD/LP – August 25, 2017
- MRG593 – The Music Tapes – The Orbiting Human Circus – MP3 – February 10, 2017
- MRG594 – Waxahatchee – Out In The Storm – CD/LP – July 14, 2017
- MRG595 – Spoon – Ga Ga Ga Ga Ga (10th Anniversary) – 2×LP – October 20, 2017
- MRG596 – The Love Language – Baby Grand – CD/LP – August 3, 2018
- MRG598 – Waxahatchee – Out In The Storm Demos – LP – July 14, 2017
- MRG599 – Destroyer – ken – CD/LP – October 20, 2017
- MRG600 – Superchunk – "I Got Cut" b/w "Up Against the Wall" – 7-inch – June 2, 2017
- MRG601 – Various Artists – 2017 Spring Sampler – CD – April 2017
- MRG602 – H.C. McEntire – Lionheart – CD/LP – January 26, 2018
- MRG603 – Superchunk – "Break The Glass" b/w "Mad World" – 7-inch – October 17, 2017
- MRG604 – Hiss Golden Messenger – "Standing in the Doorway" – Digital single – June 30, 2017
- MRG605 – Hiss Golden Messenger – Hallelujah Anyhow – CD/LP – September 22, 2017
- MRG606 – Titus Andronicus – A Productive Cough – CD/LP – March 2, 2018
- MRG607 – The Clientele – Music For The Age Of Miracles – CD/LP – September 22, 2017
- MRG608 – Ought – Room Inside The World – CD/LP – February 16, 2018
- MRG610 – Shout Out Louds – Ease My Mind – CD/LP – September 22, 2017
- MRG612 – Destroyer – "A Light Travels Down The Catwalk (Acoustic)" b/w "Stay Lost (Acoustic)" – 7-inch – October 20, 2017
- MRG613 – Escape-Ism – Introduction To Escape-Ism – CD/LP – November 10, 2017
- MRG614 – Wye Oak – "Spiral" b/w "Wave Is Not The Water" – 7-inch – September 22, 2017
- MRG615 – Wye Oak – The Louder I Call, The Faster It Runs – CD/LP – April 6, 2018
- MRG616 – Shout Out Louds – "Angel" – Flexi – September 22, 2017
- MRG617 – Various Artists – I Only Listen To The Mountain Goats: All Hail West Texas – LP – April 6, 2018
- MRG618 – Various Artists – 2017 Fall Sampler – CD – September 2017
- MRG619 – Tracey Thorn – Record – CD/LP – March 2, 2018
- MRG620 – Superchunk – What A Time To Be Alive – CD/LP – February 16, 2018
- MRG621 – Spider Bags – Someday Everything Will Be Fine – CD/LP – August 3, 2018
- MRG627 – Tracyanne & Danny – Tracyanne & Danny – CD/LP – May 25, 2018
- MRG628 – Eric Bachmann – No Recover – CD/LP – September 7, 2018
- MRG629 – Apex Manor – Heartbreak City - Peak Vinyl/CD - May 31, 2019
- MRG630 – The Rock*A*Teens – Sixth House – CD/LP – June 29, 2018
- MRG631 – Superchunk – "What A Time To Be Alive (Acoustic)" b/w "Erasure (Acoustic)" – 7-inch – April 21, 2018
- MRG632 – Mt. Wilson Repeater – V'Ger – Digital single – January 23, 2018
- MRG633 – The Essex Green – Hardly Electronic – CD/LP – June 29, 2018
- MRG636 – Martin Frawley – Undone at 31 - CD/LP - February 22, 2019
- MRG639 – Escape-ism – The Lost Record – CD/LP – September 7, 2018
- MRG641 – Various Artists – A Merge Group Plays "Heroes" - LP - February 8, 2019
- MRG643 – A Giant Dog – Neon Bible - LP - September 19, 2019
- MRG644 – Various Artists – You Wish: A Merge Records Holiday Album - LP - November 22, 2019
- MRG651 – Waxahatchee – Great Thunder – CD/EP – September 7, 2018
- MRG653 – Various Artists – Spring Sampler 2018 – CD – April 2018
- MRG657 – Superchunk / Wye Oak – "Break The Glass (Acoustic)" b/w "The Louder I Call, The Faster It Runs (Acoustic)" – 7-inch – July 2, 2018
- MRG659 – Ought – Four Desires – EP – August 21, 2018
- MRG660 – Ex Hex – It's Real - LP/CD - March 22, 2019
- MRG669 – Mike Krol – "An Ambulance" b/w "Never Know" – 7-inch – August 3, 2018
- MRG679 – The Mountain Goats – In League with Dragons – CD/LP – April 26, 2019
- MRG700 – Mikal Cronin – Seeker - LP/CD - October 25, 2019
- MRG708 – Caribou – Suddenly - CD/LP - February 28, 2020
- MRG709 – Destroyer – Have We Met - LP/CD - January 31, 2020
- MRG711 – Mikal Cronin – Switched-On Seeker - LP - June 30, 2020
- MRG716 – The Mountain Goats – Getting Into Knives - Peak Vinyl/Double LP/CD/Cassette - October 23, 2020
- MRG719 – Apex Manor – Blueprints - EP - September 6, 2019
- MRG720 – Will Butler – Generations - Peak Vinyl/LP/CD - September 25, 2020
- MRG721 – Sneaks – Happy Birthday - LP/CD - August 21, 2020
- MRG722 – H. C. McEntire – “Eno Axis” - Peak Vinyl/LP/CD - August 21, 2020
- MRG723 – Cable Ties – Far Enough - Peak Vinyl/LP/CD - March 27, 2020
- MRG724 – Archers of Loaf – "Raleigh Days" b/w "Street Fighting Man" - 7-inch - April 18, 2020
- MRG725 – Archers of Loaf – "Talking Over Talk" b/w "Cruel Reminder" - 7-inch - June 26, 2020
- MRG727 – Wye Oak – No Horizon - EP - July 31, 2020
- MRG730 – Bob Mould – Blue Hearts - LP/CD - September 25, 2020
- MRG734 – Redd Kross – Redd Cross - 12”/CD - June 26, 2020
- MRG735 – William Tyler – Music from First Cow - LP - July 31, 2020
- MRG740 – Lambchop – TRIP - Peak Vinyl/LP/CD - November 13, 2020
- MRG742 – Teenage Fanclub – Endless Arcade - LP - April 30, 2021
- MRG748 – Caribou – Never Come Back (Four Tet Remix) b/w Never Come Back (Morgan Geist Remix) - 12-inch - July 31, 2020
- MRG749 – Caribou – Never Come Back (Floating Points Remix) b/w Sister (Floating Points Remix) - 12-inch - July 31, 2020
- MRG758 – Caribou – Suddenly Remixes - 12-inch EP - October 22, 2020
- MRG762 – Superchunk – “There’s A Ghost” b/w “Alice” - FLAC - October 30, 2020
- MRG763 – Hiss Golden Messenger – School Daze: A fundraiser for Durham Public Schools students - FLAC - October 9, 2020
- MRG771 – Various Artists – “Going to Georgia” - FLAC - December 4, 2020

== 20th anniversary compilation ==
SCORE! 20 Years of Merge Records: The Covers! (MRG351) is a compilation album of cover versions of songs written by Merge artists who span the label's existence, and performed by artists not signed to the label.

Twenty covers are included, performed by Quasi, Les Savy Fav, The Shins, St. Vincent/The National, Broken Social Scene, Ryan Adams, Bright Eyes, Lavender Diamond, The Apples in Stereo, Laura Cantrell, Bill Callahan, Barbara Manning, The Mountain Goats, The New Pornographers, Tracey Thorn/Jens Lekman, The Hive Dwellers, Ted Leo and the Pharmacists, Okkervil River, Death Cab for Cutie, and Times New Viking. All proceeds from the compilation of covers were given to charity.
