= Bite (A Giant Dog album) =

Studio album by A Giant Dog
- Released: August 25, 2023
- Studios: La Cuve Studio, Angers, France
- Genres: Glam rock, garage rock
- Length: 35:05
- Label: Merge
- Producer: A Giant Dog

A Giant Dog chronology
Toy (2017)	Bite (2023)

Bite is the sixth studio album by American rock band A Giant Dog, released on August 25, 2023, through Merge Records. It is the band's first album in six years following Toy (2017), and a concept album centered on gender dysphoria set in a virtual utopian world called Avalonia.

== Background ==
Following the release of Toy in 2017, A Giant Dog began developing a concept album rather than following their usual faster songwriting process. Andrew Cashen said the idea was first discussed in 2018, describing it at the time as "such a pipe dream" while the band was touring constantly.

Unlike previous albums, which the band described as being written quickly and instinctively, the group intentionally approached Bite with a stronger narrative structure. Vocalist Sabrina Ellis explained that the band focused on building "an arc for the album," deciding which characters and conflicts needed to be represented before writing songs, which allowed for slower and more theatrical material. Ellis also stated that unlike the band's earlier, more autobiographical albums, the songs on Bite were written by projecting themselves into fictional characters.

The concept, developed over several years and accelerated during the COVID-19 pandemic, centered on a virtual reality world called Avalonia, a protagonist named Apollo, and themes involving gender dysphoria, artificial intelligence, and virtual reality. Cashen and Ellis also wrote a screenplay and television series treatment to accompany the album's story.

== Recording and production ==
Bite was recorded at La Cuve Studio in Angers, France, after the band connected with local engineers through Austin's former Sister Cities program. Ellis described the studio as being located in a converted water filtration silo.

The album was engineered by Elliot Aschard and STW, produced by A Giant Dog, mixed by John Congleton, and mastered by Dan Coutant.

== Composition ==
Bite is a science fiction–themed concept album set in the fictional virtual world of Avalonia, a technocratic alternate reality that reflects contemporary society. Critics described the album as a loose narrative or rock opera set within a near-future technocratic society, incorporating elements of science fiction and social commentary.

The album explores themes including virtual reality, gender dysphoria, and the tension between artificial systems and human experience. The song "Different Than" was specifically noted for addressing gender dysphoria.

Critics noted that the album marked a stylistic shift from the band's earlier garage rock sound toward a more theatrical glam rock and heavy metal–influenced approach, incorporating synthesizers, strings, and cinematic arrangements.

== Release ==
A Giant Dog announced Bite on June 7, 2023. The album was released on August 25, 2023, through Merge. The lead single, "Different Than", was released alongside the announcement.

== Critical reception ==
Bite received mixed-to-positive reviews from critics. At Pitchfork, Linnie Greene described the album as "ferocious and fun" but criticized the execution of its conceptual framework, awarding it a score of 6.4 out of 10. At The Austin Chronicle, Laiken Neumann described the album as an "ambitious concept album" with "sci-fi theatrics" and a glam rock–driven sound. Ben Hohenstatt of Post-Trash highlighted the album's ambitious scope and expanded sonic palette, particularly its use of synthesizers and strings to create a cinematic sound. Writing for Spectrum Culture, Holly Hazelwood criticized the album's concept as less compelling than it could have been, citing a "lack of thematic follow-through", while acknowledging that musically it still succeeds as a "melodramatic punk burner".

== Track listing ==
All tracks are written by All tracks are written by A Giant Dog.

No.	Title	Length
1.	"Welcome to Avalonia"	4:46
2.	"Happiness Awaits Inside"	3:15
3.	"I Believe"	3:21
4.	"In Destiny"	2:44
5.	"Different Than"	4:10
6.	"A Daydream"	5:06
7.	"Watch Me Sleeping"	3:09
8.	"Watch It Burn"	4:42
9.	"In Rainbows"	3:52
Total length:		35:05

== Personnel ==
=== A Giant Dog ===
- Sabrina Ellis – vocals, keyboards
- Andrew Cashen – guitar, keyboards, vocals
- Andy Bauer – guitar
- Graham Low – bass
- Daniel Blanchard – drums, percussion, vocals

=== Additional musicians ===
- Maxime Dobosz – backing vocals
- Océane Rémy – backing vocals
- Emilia Richman – backing vocals
- Geena Spigarelli – backing vocals
- Liz À la Ligne – strings
- Abraham Quivooij – strings
- Graham Low – strings
- Shaun Dickerson – keyboards
- STW – guitar solo on "Different Than"

=== Technical ===
- A Giant Dog – production
- Elliot Aschard – engineering
- STW – engineering
- Brent Baldwin – string arrangements
- John Congleton – mixing
- Dan Coutant – mastering
