= Hot and Cold =

Hot and Cold may refer to:

== Songs ==
- "Hot n Cold", by Katy Perry, 2008
- "Hot n Cold", by Albert Collins, 1965
- "Hot & Cold", by SM Town from 2022 Winter SM Town: SMCU Palace, 2022
- "Hot and Cold", by Marvin Rainwater, 1956
- "Hot and Cold", by Kate Miller-Heidke (with Yanto Browning)
- "Hot and Cold", by Jermaine Stewart and co-written by Andy Summers, 1989
- "Hot and Cold", by Eels on their album Oh What a Beautiful Morning, 2000
- "Hot and Cold", by Ex Hex released on Merge Records
- "Hot and Cold", by Fly to the Sky from Sea of Love
- "Hot and Cold", by Kiss from Sonic Boom
- "Hot and Cold", by MxPx from Let It Happen

== Other ==
- Hot and Cold (game), party game also known as Hunt the Thimble
- Hot and Cold (film), 1933 Pooch the Pup cartoon
