= Toy (A Giant Dog album) =

Studio album by A Giant Dog
- Released: August 25, 2017
- Length: 39:39
- Label: Merge

A Giant Dog chronology
Pile (2016)	Toy (2017)

Professional ratings
Aggregate scores
Source	Rating
Metacritic	78/100
Review scores
Source	Rating
AllMusic	3.5/5 stars
Pitchfork	7.4/10
PopMatters	7/10

Toy is the fourth studio album by the American punk rock band A Giant Dog. It was released on August 25, 2017 under Merge Records.

== Track listing ==
No.	Title	Length
1.	"Get Away"	2:31
2.	"Fake Plastic Trees"	3:02
3.	"Bendover"	3:02
4.	"Toy Gun"	3:48
5.	"Lucky Ponderosa"	3:09
6.	"Photograph"	2:47
7.	"Roller Coaster"	3:25
8.	"Angst in My Pants"	3:42
9.	"Tongue Tied"	2:28
10.	"Hero for the Weekend"	3:17
11.	"Making Movies"	2:29
12.	"Night Terror"	2:34
13.	"Survive"	3:32
