= WW1 (album) =

Album

Studio album by White Whale
- Released: July 25, 2006
- Recorded: 2005
- Genre: Indie rock
- Length: 49:52
- Label: Merge Records
- Producer: Ed Rose

Professional ratings
Review scores
Source	Rating
AllMusic	4/5 stars
Alternative Press	4/5 stars
Modern Music	5.8/10
Pitchfork Media	6.9/10

WW1 is the debut album by indie rock band White Whale.

== Track listing ==
All tracks are written by White Whale.

WWI
No.	Title	Length
1.	"Nine Good Fingers"	4:11
2.	"O' William, O' Sarah"	7:37
3.	"The Admiral"	3:48
4.	"I Love Lovely Chinese Gal"	3:30
5.	"What's an Ocean For?"	3:44
6.	"We're Just Temporary Ma'am"	3:59
7.	"Forgive the Forgiven"	5:09
8.	"Fidget and Fudge"	6:52
9.	"Yummyman Farewell"	4:22
10.	"King's Indian"	2:06
11.	"One Prayer"	4:34

== Personnel ==
White Whale

- Matt Suggs - Vocals, Guitar
- Zach Holland - Guitar, Lap Steel, Elec Mandolin, Keyboard
- Dustin Than Kinsey - Piano, Guitar, Synth
- Rob Pope - Bass, Moog
- John Anderson - Drums, Percussion

Additional personnel

- Ed Rose - Producer, Engineer, Mixing
- Chris Cosgrove - Engineer
- Maggie Fost - Design
- Tabitha Morris - Paintings
