= Tenement Halls =

- Genres: Indie rock
- Years active: 2005–present
- Labels: Merge Records
- Formerly of: The Rock*A*Teens
- Members: Chris Lopez

Tenement Halls is the name used by artist Chris Lopez for his solo work. Lopez was formerly the frontman and lead vocalist for indie rock band The Rock*A*Teens. As of 2024, Lopez has released one album under the Tenement Halls moniker, 2005's Knitting Needles and Bicycle Bells. It is unclear whether Lopez is still creating music, or if he intends to use the Tenement Halls name in the future.

Tenement Halls is currently signed to Merge Records.

== Knitting Needles and Bicycle Bells ==
Knitting Needles and Bicycle Bells is the only album published so far by Tenement Halls. The album was released in 2005 by Merge.

=== Track listing ===
Professional ratings
Aggregate scores
Source	Rating
Metacritic	71/100
Review scores
Source	Rating
Pitchfork	(5.3/10)

No.	Title	Length
1.	"Silver from the Slit"	3:48
2.	"Up & Over Thee Turnstiles"	3:32
3.	"As Long As It Takes"	4:57
4.	"Charlemagne"	3:19
5.	"Now She Knows"	2:33
6.	"Plenty Is Never Enough"	4:05
7.	"Marry Me"	4:34
8.	"My Wicked Wicked Ways"	3:30
9.	"Starless Night"	4:33
10.	"When the Swifts Come Home"	4:36
11.	"Promise a Place"	4:07
Total length:		43:34
