= Beverley Atonale =

Studio album by the Ladybug Transistor
- Released: February 11, 1997
- Genre: Indie pop
- Label: Merge

The Ladybug Transistor chronology
Marlborough Farms (1996)	Beverley Atonale (1997)	The Albemarle Sound (1999)

Professional ratings
Review scores
Source	Rating
AllMusic	4/5 stars
The Encyclopedia of Popular Music	3/5 stars

Beverley Atonale is the second album by the Brooklyn indie pop band the Ladybug Transistor. It was released on February 11, 1997.

== Critical reception ==
The Chicago Reader wrote that "the young quartet's reach [exceeded] their grasp: aiming for the orchestral splendor of 60s pop, they got a handful of flat, rinky-dink indie rock played on too many instruments." CMJ New Music Monthly wrote that "there's something really delightful about the idea that four people can create their own little Pet Sounds."

== Track listing ==
1. "Here Is Your Space"
2. "Rushes Of Pure Spring"
3. "Windy"
4. "The Swedish Libra And You"
5. "This Order Is Tall"
6. "Music For Tennis Courts"
7. "Your Wagging Tail (Single Space)"
8. "Stuck"
9. "Forest Marching Song"
10. "The Occasional"
11. "It Will Be A Lifetime"
12. "Thoughts Of You"
13. "The Swedish Libra II"
