= The Ladybug Transistor (album) =

Studio album by The Ladybug Transistor
- Released: October 7, 2003
- Studio: Wavelab Studios
- Genre: Indie pop
- Label: Merge Records
- Producer: Craig Schumacher

The Ladybug Transistor chronology
Argyle Heir (2001)	The Ladybug Transistor (2003)	Can't Wait Another Day (2007)

Professional ratings
Review scores
Source	Rating
AllMusic	4/5 stars
The Encyclopedia of Popular Music	4/5 stars
Pitchfork Media	7.0/10

The Ladybug Transistor is an album by the Brooklyn indie pop band The Ladybug Transistor. It was released in 2003 by Merge Records.

== Critical reception ==
The Encyclopedia of Popular Music wrote that "the blend of 70s-era AOR rock and wistful chamber pop helped make the album one of the year's most pleasant surprises." The Tucson Weekly called the album "the band's best record yet," writing that it "takes off with a flourish and spins through 13 songs played on 12-string guitars, keyboards, strings and horns."

== Track listing ==
1. "These Days In Flames"
2. "In December"
3. "3=Wild"
4. "Song For The Ending Day"
5. "Choking On Air"
6. "The Places You'll Call Home"
7. "Gospel"
8. "Please Don't Be Long"
9. "NY-San Anton"
10. "Hangin' On The Line"
11. "A Burial At Sea"
12. "Splendor In The Grass"
13. "The Last Gent"

== Personnel ==
- Gary Olson - vocals and trumpet
- Jeff Baron - guitar
- Sasha Bell - vocals, piano, organ and flute
- San Fadyl - drums
- Julia Rydholm - bass guitar and violin
