= The Albemarle Sound =

Studio album by the Ladybug Transistor
- Released: March 23, 1999
- Genre: Indie pop; baroque pop; sunshine pop
- Label: Merge

The Ladybug Transistor chronology
Beverley Atonale (1997)	The Albemarle Sound (1999)	Argyle Heir (2001)

Professional ratings
Review scores
Source	Rating
AllMusic	4.5/5 stars
Robert Christgau	(dud)
The Encyclopedia of Popular Music	4/5 stars
Pitchfork	8.0/10

The Albemarle Sound is the third album by the Brooklyn, New York, indie pop band the Ladybug Transistor. It was released on March 23, 1999.

== Critical reception ==
The A.V. Club wrote: "Rich and instantly accessible, the Ladybug Transistor has created a sound, regardless of source material, that's entirely its own." The Hartford Courant called the album "a collection of panoramic, pastoral pop that reflects the sights and sounds of their world with the same loving texture and color that Brian Wilson illustrated the California shore with."

== Track listing ==
1. "Oriental Boulevard"
2. "Six Times"
3. "Meadowport Arch"
4. "Today Knows"
5. "The Great British Spring"
6. "Like A Summer Rain"
7. "The Swimmer"
8. "Cienfuegos"
9. "The Automobile Song"
10. "Oceans In The Hall"
11. "Vale Of Cashmere"
12. "Aleida's Theme"
