= The Gasoline Age =

Studio album by East River Pipe
- Released: August 10, 1999
- Length: 44:37
- Label: Merge Records

East River Pipe chronology
Mel (1996)	The Gasoline Age (1999)	Garbageheads on Endless Stun (2003)

Professional ratings
Review scores
Source	Rating
AllMusic	4/5 stars
Robert Christgau	(2-star Honorable Mention)
Pitchfork Media	8.0/10

The Gasoline Age is an album by East River Pipe, released in 1999.

== Critical reception ==
The A.V. Club wrote that "the synthy, slightly samey pleasures of The Gasoline Age aren't quite as compelling as Cornog's earlier works—in fitting with the car theme, some of it sounds like it was composed on cruise control—but East River Pipe still has a way with moody, mellow mini-epics that puts other sad sacks to shame."

== Track listing ==
1. "Shiny, Shiny Pimpmobile" – 3:40
2. "Hell Is an Open Door" – 2:39
3. "Cybercar" – 3:13
4. "Wholesale Lies" – 1:44
5. "My Little Rainbow" – 2:14
6. "Party Drive" – 3:31
7. "King of Nothing Never" – 1:57
8. "14th Street Boys Stolen Car Club" – 2:19
9. "All You Little Suckers" – 2:07
10. "Astrofarm" – 4:30
11. "Down 42nd Street to the Light" – 4:04
12. "Atlantic City (Gonna Make a Million Tonight)" – 9:43
13. "Don't Hurry" – 2:56
