= Argyle Heir =

Studio album by The Ladybug Transistor
- Released: May 22, 2001
- Genre: Indie pop, baroque pop
- Label: Merge Records

The Ladybug Transistor chronology
The Albemarle Sound (1999)	Argyle Heir (2001)	The Ladybug Transistor (2003)

Professional ratings
Review scores
Source	Rating
AllMusic	3.5/5 stars
The Encyclopedia of Popular Music	3/5 stars
Pitchfork Media	6.8/10

Argyle Heir is a studio album by the American indie pop band the Ladybug Transistor. It was released on May 22, 2001, via Merge Records.

== Critical reception ==
The Austin American-Statesman wrote that "these Brooklyn nerds are at their best when they keep it simple, as on 'Echoes', a twangy number that sounds like an outtake from the Byrds' Sweetheart of the Rodeo, or on 'Going Up North', a waltz instrumental with warm Mellotron tones and, uh, sleigh bells (which make several appearances throughout the record)."

== Track listing ==
1. "Fires On The Ocean"
2. "Echoes"
3. "Perfect For Shattering"
4. "Going Up North (Icicles)"
5. "Wooden Bars"
6. "Catherine Elizabeth"
7. "Nico Norte"
8. "Words Hang In The Air"
9. "Fjords Of Winter"
10. "In A Certain Place"
11. "Brighton Bound"
12. "The Reclusive Hero"
13. "The Glass Pane"
14. "Caton Gardens"

== Personnel ==
- Gary Olson - vocals and trumpet
- Jeff Baron - guitar
- Jennifer Baron - bass guitar
- Sasha Bell - vocals, piano, organ and flute
- San Fadyl - drums
- Julia Rydholm - violin
