= The Hunt (Guv'ner album) =

Studio album by Guv'ner
- Released: 1996
- Studio: Rare Book Room, Williamsburg, NY
- Genre: Indie rock
- Label: Merge Records; Wiiija Records
- Producer: Don Fleming, Julie Cafritz

Guv'ner chronology
Hard For Measy For You (1994)	The Hunt (1996)	Spectral Worship (1998)

Professional ratings
Review scores
Source	Rating
AllMusic	3.5/5 stars

The Hunt is the second album by the American indie band Guv'ner. It was released in 1996 by Merge Records in the United States, and Wiiija Records in the UK. The album was produced by Don Fleming and Julie Cafritz.

"She's Evil," "The Nazarene," and "Break a Promise" were released as singles. Guv'ner supported the album by touring with Cat Power.

== Critical reception ==
The Washington Post wrote that "Guv'ner favors a ragged, grimy sound ... When bassist Pumpkin Wentzel ... adds her harmonies, Guv'ner goes pop despite its best attempts at edginess and minimalism." The Fort Worth Star-Telegram deemed the album "tuneful, heartfelt—sometimes humorous and goofy—rock."

The San Diego Union-Tribune praised Wentzel, writing that her "instrumentation and too-infrequent singing make Pixies-era Kim Deal a handy reference point." The State concluded that the band manages "to retain its lo-fi elegance and inspired dilettantish approach."

In 2003, Philadelphia Weekly called the album "an overlooked treasure."

== Track listing ==
1. "Motorcycle Man"
2. "Stone's Throw"
3. "She's Evil"
4. "The Nazarene"
5. "Your Majesty"
6. "Tom Tom"
7. "Break a Promise"
8. "Feet on Wood"
9. "Southern Baptist w/ Sparklers"
10. "Leave Me Be"
11. "Rockbending"
12. "Ghost of Your Controllership"

== Instrumentation and Personnel ==
- Charles Gansa (guitar, vocals)
- Pumpkin Wentzel (bass, vocals)
- Danny Tunick (drums)
- Julie Cafritz and Don Fleming (backing vocals on "She's Evil")
