= What Are You On? =

Studio album by East River Pipe
- Released: 2006
- Length: 36:31
- Label: Merge Records

East River Pipe chronology
| Garbageheads on Endless Stun (2003) | What Are You On? (2006) |

Professional ratings
Review scores
| Source | Rating |
|---|---|
| AllMusic | 4/5 stars |
| Pitchfork Media | 5.8/10 |

What Are You On? is an album by East River Pipe, released in 2006.

== Track listing ==
1. "What Does T.S. Eliot Know About You?" – 2:30
2. "Crystal Queen" – 2:29
3. "What Are You On?" – 2:02
4. "I'll Walk My Robot Home" – 3:09
5. "The Ultrabright Bitch" – 2:07
6. "Druglife" – 3:49
7. "Absolutely Nothing" – 2:12
8. "Dirty Carnival" – 3:06
9. "You Got Played, Little Girl" – 2:09
10. "Life Is a Landfill" – 2:57
11. "Shut Up and Row" – 2:17
12. "Trivial Things" – 2:25
13. "Some Dreams Can Kill You" – 5:19
