= Garbageheads on Endless Stun =

Studio album by East River Pipe
- Released: 2003
- Length: 44:42
- Label: Merge Records

East River Pipe chronology
The Gasoline Age (1999)	Garbageheads on Endless Stun (2003)	What Are You On? (2006)

Professional ratings
Review scores
Source	Rating
AllMusic	4/5 stars

Garbageheads on Endless Stun is an album by East River Pipe, released in 2003.

== Track listing ==
1. "Where Does All the Money Go?" – 3:06
2. "Monumental Freaks" – 2:59
3. "I Won't Dream About the Girl" – 4:30
4. "I Bought a Gun in Irvington" – 5:04
5. "Girls on the Freeway" – 2:41
6. "The Long Black Cloud" – 3:45
7. "Arrival Pad #19" – 3:47
8. "Streetwalkin' Jean" – 4:56
9. "Stare the Graveyard Down" – 5:04
10. "Millionaires of Doubt" – 4:36
11. "It's Always Been This Way" – 4:14
