= Can't Wait Another Day =

Studio album by The Ladybug Transistor
- Released: June 5, 2007
- Genre: Indie pop
- Label: Merge Records

The Ladybug Transistor chronology
The Ladybug Transistor (2003)	Can't Wait Another Day (2007)	Clutching Stems (2011)

Professional ratings
Review scores
Source	Rating
AllMusic	4/5 stars
Drowned in Sound	6/10
Pitchfork Media	6.4/10
Stylus Magazine	B−
Tiny Mix Tapes	3.5/5 stars

Can't Wait Another Day is an album by the Brooklyn indie pop band The Ladybug Transistor, and the last with the drummer San Fadyl. It was released on June 5, 2007, by Merge Records.

== Critical reception ==
Exclaim! wrote that "this is far from a bad album--in fact, it's pretty good--it's just somewhat disappointing to see the band shrink away from the unabashed joyfulness they once made their own." The Guardian wrote that "long-term fans will envelop themselves happily in the album's soft loveliness, despite a feeling that some more memorable moments would have been welcome."

== Track listing ==
1. "Always on the Telephone"
2. "I'm Not Mad Enough"
3. "Here Comes the Rain"
4. "Terry"
5. "This Old Chase"
6. "For No Other"
7. "Three Days from Now"
8. "In-Between"
9. "So Blind"
10. "Broken Links"
11. "California Stopover"
12. "Lord, Don't Pass Me By"

== Personnel ==
- Gary Olson - vocals, guitar and trumpet
- Jeff Baron - guitar
- Ben Crum - guitar
- San Fadyl - drums
- Kyle Forester - piano, organ and backing vocals
- Julia Rydholm - bass guitar and backing vocals
