= Hard for Measy for You =

Album by Guv'ner

Hard For Measy For You

Studio album by Guv'ner
- Released: 1994
- Studio: Hum/Café Cognac & Manhattan Beach Recording, NY
- Genre: Indie rock
- Label: Wiiija Records / Ecstatic Peace
- Producer: Julie Cafritz and Michael Rohatyn

Guv'ner chronology
Hard For Measy For You (1994)	The Hunt (1996)

Professional ratings
Review scores
Source	Rating
AllMusic	link

Hard For Measy For You is an album by the American indie band Guv'ner. It was released by Ecstatic Peace! in the US and Wiiija Records in the UK in 1994. Drumming duties on the album were shared by Brian Logan (plays on "No Big Deal", "Bridge Under Water" and "Making Headlines") and Jamie Lawrence ("Red Velvet Chair", "Go To Sleep" and "Wild Couple").

== Track listing ==
1. "Drummer Want-Ad"
2. "No Big Deal"
3. "Red Velvet Chair"
4. "Little Bitch on the Phone"
5. "Bridge Under Water"
6. "Almond Roca"
7. "Making Headlines"
8. "Go to Sleep"
9. "Wild Couple"
10. "Touch Wood"
11. "Amplituden"
12. "And also..."
13. "I Will Get You"
14. "Thespian Girl"
15. "She Dog Stop"

== Personnel ==
- Charles Gansa (guitar, vocals)
- Pumpkin Wentzel (bass, vocals)
- Brian Logan (drums)
- Jamie Lawrence (drums)
