= Marlborough Farms =

Studio album by the Ladybug Transistor
- Released: October 4, 1996
- Genre: Indie pop
- Label: Feeding Frenzy

The Ladybug Transistor chronology
Marlborough Farms (1996)	Beverley Atonale (1997)

Professional ratings
Review scores
Source	Rating
AllMusic	3.5/5 stars
The Encyclopedia of Popular Music	3/5 stars

Marlborough Farms is the first album by the Brooklyn indie pop band the Ladybug Transistor. It was released on October 4, 1996.

The album was named after vocalist/guitarist Gary Olson's home studio.

== Critical reception ==
Douglas Wolk, in Salon, called the album "a competent Pavement rip-off with some curious touches in its arrangements, like singer Gary Olson's trumpet parts."

== Track listing ==
1. "Wheel"
2. "(Theme To) Lout"
3. "Magic Forest Report"
4. "Sneedle"
5. "Seadrift"
6. "Blaze"
7. "95 Miles Per Hour"
8. "Land"
9. "Twice a Lifetime"
10. "Song for Vocoder and Trumpet"
