= Mount Moriah (band) =

American folk band

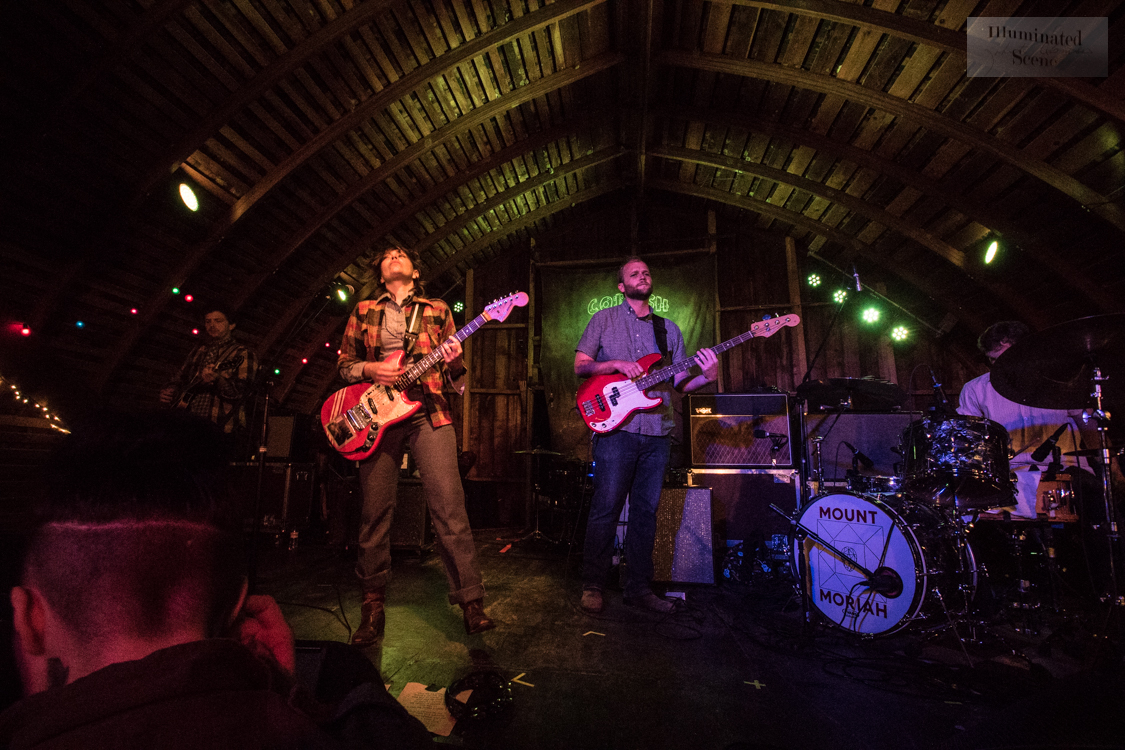

Background information
- Genres: Folk
- Years active: 2011–present
- Labels: Merge Records
- Members: H.C. McEntire; Jenks Miller; Casey Toll
- Website: mountmoriah.bandcamp.com

Mount Moriah is an American folk band consisting of lead vocalist Heather "H.C." McEntire, guitarist Jenks Miller, and bassist Casey Toll.

== Discography ==
- Mount Moriah (2011, Holidays For Quince Records)
- Miracle Temple (2013, Merge Records)
- How to Dance (2016, Merge Records)
