= Spectral Worship =

Studio album by Guv'ner
- Released: 1998
- Studio: Rare Book Room, Williamsburg, NY
- Genre: Indie rock
- Label: Merge Records
- Producer: Nicolas Vernhes, Charles Gansa

Guv'ner chronology
The Hunt (1996)	Spectral Worship (1998)

Professional ratings
Review scores
Source	Rating
AllMusic	4/5 stars
NME	4/5 stars

Spectral Worship is a studio album by the indie rock band Guv'ner, released in 1998 on Merge Records. The album contains a cover of "Jealous Guy" by John Lennon, re-titled "Jealous Girl".

== Critical reception ==
The Washington Post thought that "singer-guitarist Charles Gansa, bassist-singer Pumpkin Wentzel and drummer Danny Tunick don't demolish traditional song form, but they do like to beat it up a bit." Philadelphia City Paper called the album "a charming swirl of their cheeky, off-key melodicisms and experimental tweeks and wonks ... Even bassist Pumpkin Wentzel's conceptually ill-conceived cover of John Lennon's 'Jealous Guy' works with a little chutzpah." NME concluded that the album "chews on exactly the same pop bubblegum as their previous releases with a nerdy hook here, a quirky instrument there (castanets, Moog, Spanish guitars, etc) but, unlike 1996’s The Hunt, it chooses to hide its considerable light under a bushel of obscurity."

AllMusic wrote that "the album is a frequently brilliant combination of acoustic guitars, assorted tone waves and other varied sounds, drawing them together into minimal but highly dynamic and well-constructed pieces in a beautifully rustic, desolate ballad style."

== Track listing ==
1. "Spectral Worship"
2. "Chereza"
3. "Love the Lamp"
4. "Wounded Birds and Vampires own the Edge"
5. "Anaphelact"
6. "Coozwax"
7. "Jealous Girl" (Lennon)
8. "Time Rarely Stand Still" [sic]
9. "Anything"
10. "Difficulty in Openness"
11. "Someone Else"
12. "Spectral Workshop"
13. "Welcome"

== Instrumentation and Personnel ==
- Charles Gansa (guitar, vocals)
- Pumpkin Wentzel (bass, vocals)
- Danny Tunick (drums, marimba)
- Cindy Greene (whistling)
- Nicky Furnace (backing vocals, handclaps)
- So Yong Kim (tongue claps)
- Michael Rohatyn (vocals)
