= H.C. McEntire =

American folk musician

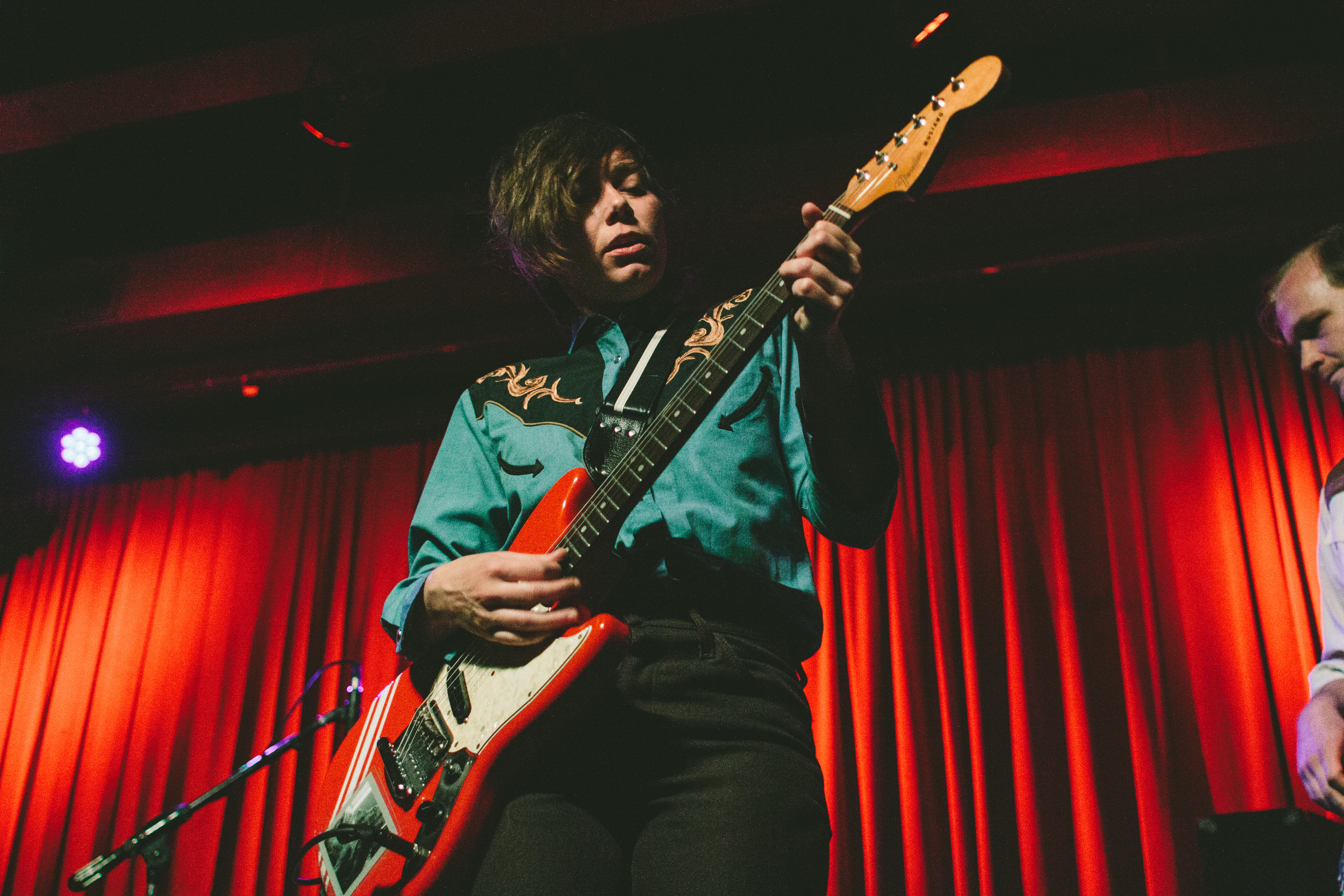
McEntire performing in 2016

Heather "H.C." McEntire is an American folk musician from Durham, North Carolina.

== History ==
McEntire began her career in the band Mount Moriah. She has released three solo albums, all through Merge Records: LIONHEART (2018), Eno Axis (2020), and Every Acre (2023).

== Discography ==
Studio albums

- LIONHEART (2018, Merge Records)
- Eno Axis (2020, Merge Records)
- Every Acre (2023, Merge Records)
