= Clutching Stems =

Studio album by The Ladybug Transistor
- Released: June 7, 2011
- Genre: Indie pop
- Label: Merge Records

The Ladybug Transistor chronology
Can't Wait Another Day (2007)	Clutching Stems (2011)

Clutching Stems is an album by the indie pop band The Ladybug Transistor. It was released on June 7, 2011, by Merge Records.

== Reception ==
Professional ratings
Aggregate scores
Source	Rating
Metacritic	73/100
Review scores
Source	Rating
AllMusic	4.5/5 stars
The A.V. Club	A−
Pitchfork	6.4/10
PopMatters	6/10 stars

Clutching Stems received positive reviews from critics. On Metacritic, the album holds a score of 73/100 based on 9 reviews, indicating "generally favorable reviews".

== Track listing ==
1. "Clutching Stems"
2. "Light on the Narrow Gauge"
3. "Fallen and Falling"
4. "Ignore the Bell"
5. "Oh Christina"
6. "Caught Don't Walk"
7. "Breaking Up on the Beat"
8. "Into the Straight"
9. "Hey Jack I'm on Fire"
10. "Life Less True"
