= Apex Manor =

American indie rock band

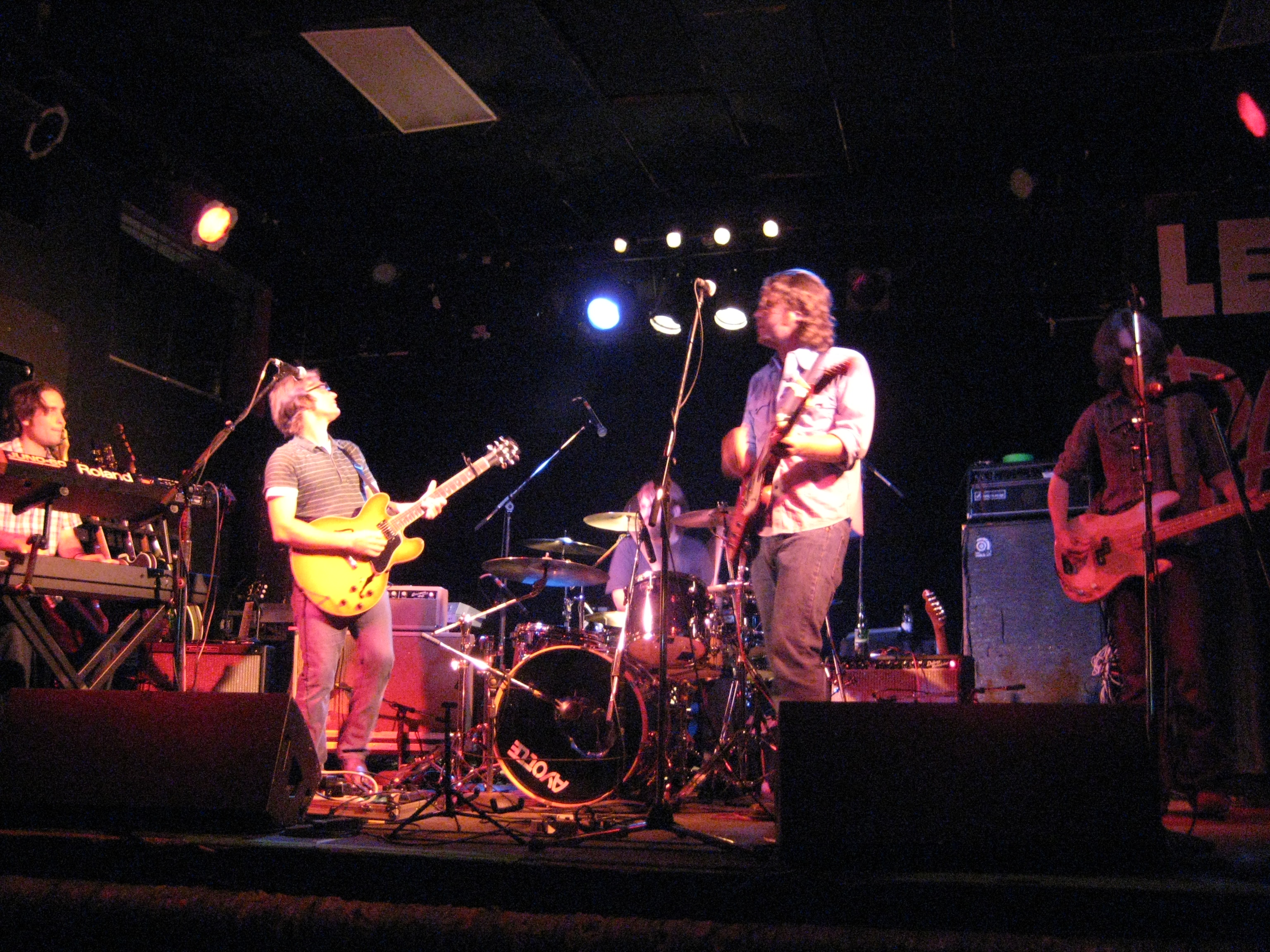
- Ross Flournoy of Apex Manor performing with The Broken West

Background information
- Origin: Pasadena, California, USA
- Genres: Indie rock Power pop
- Years active: 2011-Present
- Label: Merge
- Spinoff of: The Broken West
- Members: Ross Flournoy; Adam Vine; Brian Whelan; Andy Creighton
- Website: www.apexmanor.com

Apex Manor is an American indie rock band, formed in Pasadena, California in 2010.

Ross Flournoy of The Broken West wrote the band's first songs during an online songwriting contest at NPR. Their debut LP, The Year of Magical Drinking, was released on January 25, 2011 on Merge records.

== Discography ==
- 2011: The Year of Magical Drinking
- 2019: Heartbreak City
