= Breadwinner (band) =

American math rock band

- Origin: Richmond, Virginia, U.S.
- Genres: Alternative metal; math rock; progressive metal
- Years active: 1990–1992
- Label: Merge Records
- Members: Pen Rollings; Robert Donne; Chris Farmer

Breadwinner was a math rock-band based in Richmond, Virginia, composed of Pen Rollings (guitar), Robert Donne (bass), and Chris Farmer (drums). Rollings had previously been a member of hardcore punk outfit Honor Role. Merge Records released two 7-inch singles and one full-length album, Burner (1994), comprising the two out of print singles and three unreleased tracks, after the band had broken up. The group has been called "the consummate math band" and are one of the key bands in the early history of math rock. The group has been called an influence on Battles and Lamb of God.

Guitarist Rollings later formed the band Loincloth.
