= Guv'ner =

American alternative rock band

- Origin: New York, New York State, U.S.
- Genres: Alternative rock
- Years active: 1993–1999
- Labels: Merge; Ecstatic Peace; Wiiija
- Members: Charles Gansa (vocals, guitar); Pumpkin Wentzel (bass, vocals); Danny Tunick (drums)
- Past members: Brian Logan (drums); Jamie Lawrence (drums)

Guv'ner was an American alternative rock band from New York City, formed in 1993 following a relationship between members Charles Gansa and Pumpkin Wentzel. Thurston Moore of Sonic Youth discovered the band when he was handed a demo of theirs by Julia Cafritz of Pussy Galore, who had known Wentzel since school. Moore put out Guv'ner's debut album Hard for Measy for You on his label, Ecstatic Peace.

Further albums – The Hunt and Spectral Worship – were released on Merge Records in 1996 and 1998 respectively. The drummer, Danny Tunick, joined after the debut album. On Hard For Measy For You, drumming duties were shared by Brian Logan and Jamie Lawrence.

== Discography ==
=== Albums ===
Title	Release date	Label
Hard for Measy for You	1994	Ecstatic Peace!
The Hunt	1996	Merge Records
Spectral Worship	1998	Merge Records

=== Singles/EPs ===
Title	Release date	Label
Earl Grey Tea	1993	Gap Year
Curry Favor	1994	Wiiija
Baby's Way Cruel	1995	Wiiija
Knight Moves	1995	Merge Records
The Nazarene	1996	Radiation Records
Break a Promise	1996	Merge Records
She's Evil	1996	Wiiija
In the Fishtank Vol. 2	1997	De Konkurrent

Split singles

Title	Release date	Label	Song Featured
Porn No. 2 (w/The Melvins)	1995	Amphetamine Reptile Records	Coitus City
Guv'ner in Catpowerland/Cat Power goes to Guvnerville (w/Cat Power)	1996	"Guvpower" (financed jointly by Matador and Wiiija, distributed by Wiiija)	Great Expectations

=== Compilation appearances ===
Title	Release date	Label	Song Featured
Threadwaxing Space Live: The Presidential Compilation	1995	Zero Hour Records	I Will Get You (live)
Star Trackers a Spunk Compilation	1995	Free cassette tape with Spunk magazine	I Will Get You
Screwed	1996	Amphetamine Reptile Records	Coitus City
Compulsiv III	1996	Compulsiv Records	Lotus Fix
Merge 100	1997	Merge Records	Your Majesty (Mark Robinson remix)
Oh, Merge	1999	Merge Records	Lucky Ladybug
Old Enough To Know Better: 15 Years of Merge Records	2004	Merge Records	Break a Promise
