= Butterglory =

American indie rock band

- Origin: Lawrence, Kansas, U.S.
- Genres: Indie rock, indie pop, lo-fi
- Years active: 1992–1997
- Labels: Merge
- Past members: Matt Suggs; Debby Vander Wall; Stephen Naron

Butterglory was an American indie rock band from Lawrence, Kansas. Contemporaries of indie rock groups like Pavement and Archers of Loaf, the band released four albums with Merge Records.

== History ==
Composed of Matt Suggs and Debby Vander Wall, the band began in 1992 with the release of Alexander Bends EP. They later joined Merge Records and released their first album Crumble in 1994. This was followed by a collection of singles, Downed in 1995. Adding bassist Stephen Naron and a variety of other musicians, the group released the more developed Are You Building a Temple in Heaven?. The group's final record, Rat Tat Tat was released on Merge Records in 1997.

Matt Suggs now plays with White Whale.

== Discography ==
LPS

- Crumble (1994)
- Are You Building a Temple in Heaven? (1996)
- Rat Tat Tat (1997)

Compilations

- Downed (1995)
