= White Whale (band) =

American indie rock band

- Origin: Lawrence, Kansas, U.S.
- Genres: Indie rock
- Years active: 2005–present
- Labels: Merge
- Members: Matt Suggs; Rob Pope; John Anderson; Zach Holland; Dustin Kinsey

White Whale is an American indie rock band from Lawrence, Kansas, composed of former members of Butterglory, The Get Up Kids, and Thee Higher Burning Fire. They are signed to Merge Records and released their first full-length album WW1 on July 25, 2006.

== Background ==
When Matt Suggs, former lead singer of Butterglory, began touring for his 2003 solo album, Amigo Row, he recruited former Higher Burning Fire drummer John Anderson, keyboardist and guitarist Dustin Kinsey (also of The New Amsterdams), and guitarist Zach Holland. Having played together off and on since 2000 they decided to form White Whale adding ex-Get Up Kids bassist Robert Pope.

The band has been called both a side project and an indie supergroup. Merge Records release their first album on July 25, 2006, prompting state representatives Barbara Ballard and Ann Mah to have the day declared "White Whale Day" in Kansas.

== Discography ==
- WW1 (2006)

The single "Matchbook" was included on the 2007 compilation First Blood on OxBlood Records.

== Reviews ==
- IGN (8.6)
- Pitchfork (6.9)
- Independent Weekly
- JamBase
