= East River Pipe =

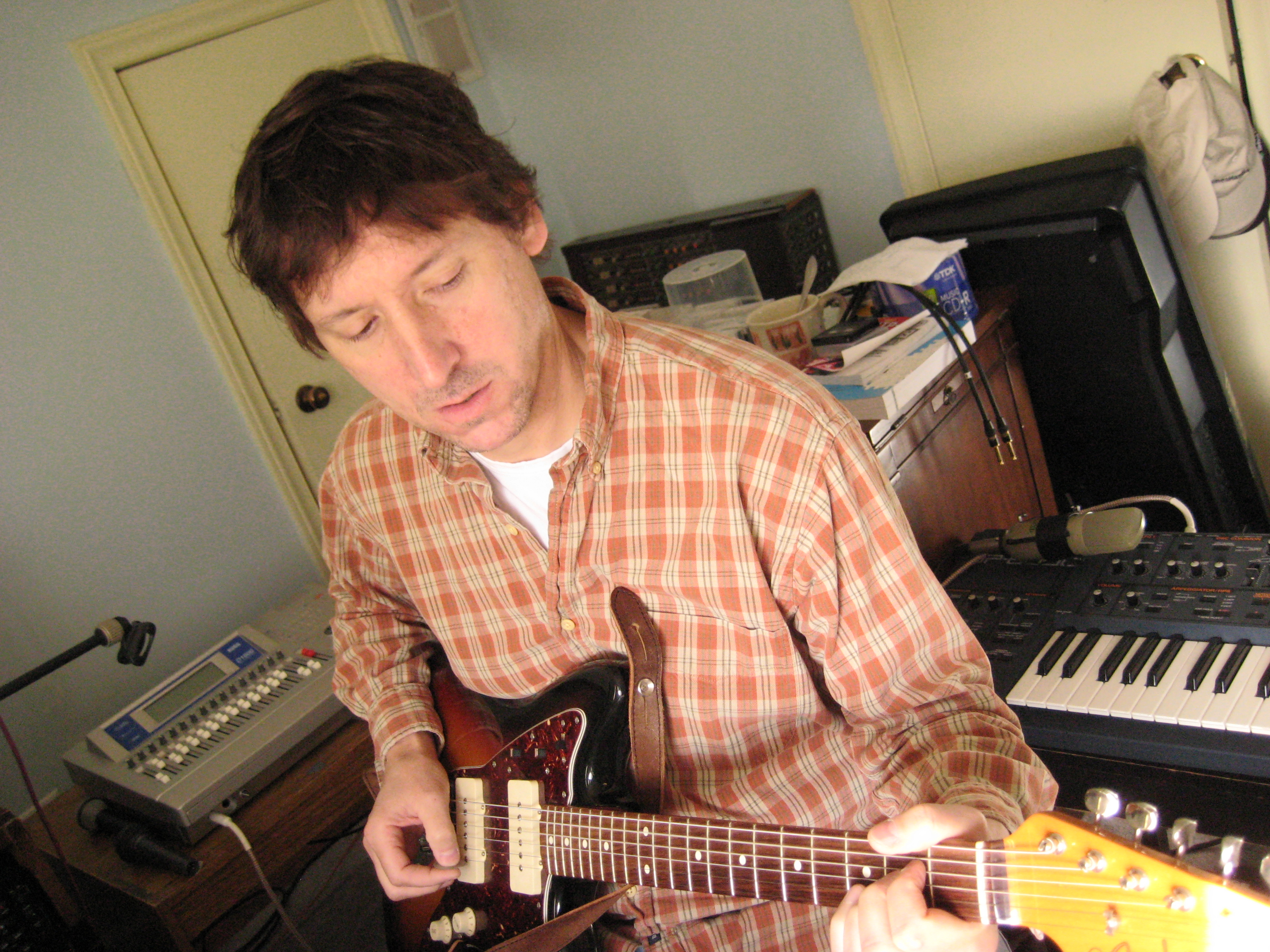
- East River Pipe in home studio

Background information
- Born: Frederick Cornog; Norfolk, Virginia, United States
- Origin: New York City, United States
- Occupations: Songwriter, singer, home recordist
- Years active: 1989-present
- Labels: Ajax Records, Sarah, Merge, Hell Gate Productions

F.M. Cornog is an American songwriter, singer, self-taught musician, and home-recordist who records under the name East River Pipe. The New York Times described Cornog as "the Brian Wilson of home recording."

Cornog was born in Norfolk, Virginia, and raised in Summit, New Jersey. After high school, Cornog worked a series of menial jobs before succumbing to alcoholism, drug abuse, mental illness, and eventual homelessness, ending up in the Hoboken train station.

During this time he met Astoria, Queens-resident Barbara Powers, and with Powers' support and label (Hell Gate), Cornog released some home-recorded cassettes and 7" singles under the name East River Pipe, which he chose after observing a sewage pipe spewing out raw waste into the East River. These initial 7" singles attracted the attention of UK-based Sarah Records who released his records from 1993 to 1996, making Cornog one of the few American artists ever signed to the label.

In the U.S., Cornog released his first LP, Shining Hours In A Can, on the Chicago-based micro-indie Ajax Records in 1994. A year later, he found a more permanent home on Merge Records, the Chapel Hill-based indie run by Mac McCaughan and Laura Ballance. Merge released Poor Fricky (1995), Mel (1996), The Gasoline Age (1999), Shining Hours In A Can (2002;reissue), Garbageheads On Endless Stun (2003), What Are You On? (2006), and We Live In Rented Rooms (2011).

Artists who have covered East River Pipe songs include David Byrne, Lambchop, The Mountain Goats, Waxahatchee, Okkervil River, The Pains of Being Pure at Heart, For Against, Mary Lou Lord, and others. Rolling Stone called Cornog "the most gifted of the new loners."

== Discography ==
=== Albums ===
- 1994 Shining Hours in a Can (Ajax)
- 1994 Poor Fricky (Sarah, UK)
- 1995 Poor Fricky (Merge, US)
- 1996 Mel (Merge, US; Shinkansen, UK)
- 1999 The Gasoline Age (Merge)
- 2002 Shining Hours in a Can (Merge) (Reissue)
- 2003 Garbageheads on Endless Stun (Merge)
- 2006 What Are You On? (Merge)
- 2011 We Live in Rented Rooms (Merge)

=== EPs ===
- 1993 Goodbye California (Sarah)
- 1995 Even the Sun Was Afraid (Sarah)

=== Singles ===
- 1991 "Axl or Iggy" / Helmet On" (Hell Gate)
- 1992 "My Life is Wrong" / "She's a Real Good Time" (Hell Gate)
- 1992 "Make a Deal with the City" / "Psychic Whore" (Hell Gate)
- 1993 "Helmet On" (Sarah)
- 1993 "She's a Real Good Time" (Sarah)
- 1993 "Firing Room" / "Hey, Where's Your Girl" (Hell Gate)
- 1994 "Ah Dictaphone" / "Hide My Life Away from You" (Hell Gate)
- 1995 "Bring on the Loser" (Merge)
- 1996 "Miracleland" (Shinkansen)
- 1996 "Kill the Action" (Merge)

=== Cassette-only releases ===
- 1989 East River Pipe (Hell Gate, cassette tape)
- 1990 Point of Memory (Hell Gate, cassette tape)
- 1991 I Used To Be Kid Colgate (Hell Gate, cassette tape)

== Other media ==
Knockaround Guys American feature film directed by Brian Koppelman; East River Pipe's "Make A Deal With The City"

Down To The Bone American feature film Directed by Debra Granik; East River Pipe's "Arrival Pad #19"

Lake City American feature film directed by Hunter Hill and Perry Moore; East River Pipe's "Bring On The Loser"

"Drinking the Kool-Aid" an episode of the American television series Veronica Mars; East River Pipe's "Make A Deal With The City"

World of Jenks American documentary series on MTV; East River Pipe's "Three Ships"

This Summer Feeling French feature film directed by Mikhaël Hers; East River Pipe's "Make A Deal With The City"
