= Radar Bros. =

- Labels: Merge Records; Chemikal Underground; Squid vs. Whale; See Thru Broadcasting; Restless; Fingerpaint Records
- Members: Jim Putnam; Be Hussey; Stevie Treichel; Ethan Walter; Brian Cleary; Jim Bowers
- Past members: Senon Williams; Steve Goodfriend; Jeff Palmer; Dan Iead

Radar Bros. (also known as Radar Brothers) are an American indie rock band from Los Angeles formed in 1993 by Jim Putnam (vocals, guitar, keyboard), Senon Williams (bass), and Steve Goodfriend (drums). They released their self-titled EP in 1995 on Fingerpaint Records. In 1996, they signed to Restless Records releasing Radar Bros. in early 1997.

Jim Putnam is the son of Bill Putnam, founder of Universal Audio. He founded both Universal Recorders and United Western Recorders. Jim Putnam was a former guitarist for Medicine and Maids of Gravity before starting the Radar Bros. Putnam has recorded most of the Radar Bros. albums and the Mt. Wilson Repeater release in his studio, the Phase 4 Intergalactic Recording Facility.

Radar Bros. sixth album, The Illustrated Garden, was released in March 2010 on Merge Records (U.S.), and the Chemikal Underground label (U.K./EU). He was the first to include new members Be Hussey and Stevie Treichel, who joined in 2008 to tour with the Auditorium album release in the U.S. and Europe. Original member Senon Williams left the band to play bass in Dengue Fever. An LP version of The Illustrated Garden was released September 2010 on the Squid vs. Whale label. Radar Bros. have headlined many tours in the United States, Canada, and Europe as well as supporting the bands Modest Mouse and Teenage Fanclub on their 2010 U.S. tours. They supported the Breeders on their 2002 European tour and played with bands including Low, Cat Power, The Decemberists, Bardo Pond, The Black Heart Procession, and My Morning Jacket. Radar Bros. recorded with John Peel for his "Peel sessions" (December 10, 1996) and also played at the All Tomorrow's Parties festival at UK 2000 and UK 2006.

The music video for "Brother Rabbit" from the album Auditorium was shot in Oklahoma in Healdton, Noble, and Norman in June 2008 and directed by The General Assembly. Putnam's side project Mt. Wilson Repeater released their debut self-titled album in the U.S. in April 2008 on the Eastern Fiction label and in the U.K. in October 2008 on the Chemikal Underground record label. The latest album, Eight, was released in the U.S. on January 29, 2013, on Merge Records. The line-up expanded to include Ethan Walter (keyboards, piano), Brian Cleary (piano, keyboards), and Dan Iead (guitar, pedal steel), who have all toured with the band since 2010. Most recently, guitarist Jim Bowers joined the band as a touring member.

== Discography ==
=== Albums ===
- Radar Bros. (1997, Restless Records)
- The Singing Hatchet (1999, See Thru Broadcasting (US) / Chemikal Underground (UK/EU)))
- And The Surrounding Mountains (2002, Merge Records (US) / Chemikal Underground (UK/EU)))
- The Fallen Leaf Pages (2005, Merge Records (US) / Chemikal Underground (UK/EU)))
- Auditorium (2008, Merge Records (US) / Chemikal Underground (UK/EU))
- The Illustrated Garden (2010, Merge Records (US) / Chemikal Underground (UK/EU))
- Eight (2013, Merge Records)

=== EPs and singles ===
- Radar Bros. – 10″ EP (1995, Fingerpaint Records)
- Radio Edits- EP CD (1996, Restless)
- Stay - EP (1997, Restless)
- Open Ocean Sailing- 7″ (1999, Chemikal Underground)
- Shoveling Sons - 7" (2000, Chemikal Underground)
- Singles + B-Sides CD EP (2000, Self-Released)
- Papillon - Promo Single (2006, Chemikal Underground)

=== Compilations ===
- Survive And Advance Vol.1 - “Silver Shoes” (2002, Merge Records)
- Old Enough To Know Better – 15 Years of Merge: “Painted Forest Fire” (2004, Merge Records)
- The Old Lonesome Sound - “Moonshiner” (2009, Splice Today)
- RAM On L.A.- “Uncle Albert/Admiral Halsey” (2009, Aquarium Drunkard)
- SCORE! 20 Years of Merge Records Vol.11 : Kara Walker - "Show Yourself" (2009, Merge Records)
- SCORE! 20 Years of Merge Records Vol.12 : Amy Poehler - "Pomona" (2009, Merge Records)
- Score! 20 Years of Merge Records Vol.12 : Amy Poehler - “We Got The Beat” (2009, Merge Records)
- MERGE Digital Sampler- “Horses Warriors” (2010, Merge Records)

== Line-up ==
Current

- Jim Putnam - Lead Vocals, Guitar, Keyboard (founder-present)
- Be Hussey - Bass, Background Vocals (2008–present)
- Stevie Treichel - Drums (2008–present)
- Ethan Walter - Piano, Keyboards (2010–present)
- Brian Cleary - Piano, Keyboards (2010–present)
- Jim Bowers - Guitars (live) (2012–present)

Former

- Dan Iead - Guitar, Pedal Steel (2009–12)
- Steve Goodfriend - Drums (founder–2008)
- Senon Williams - Bass (founder–2008)
- Jeff Palmer - Guitar, Backing Vocals (2005–08)

Touring members

- Aaron Burtch - Drums (live)
- Eric Morgan - Drums (live) (2008)
- Aaron Kyle - Guitar (live) (2008)
- Eddie Ruscha - Keyboards (live)
- Sean Fallon - Keyboards (live)
- Mark Lightcap - Guitar (live)
- Brian Thornell - Keyboards (live)
- Mark Wooten - Keyboards (live)
- Matt Sevareid - Guitar
