= The Broken West =

American power pop band

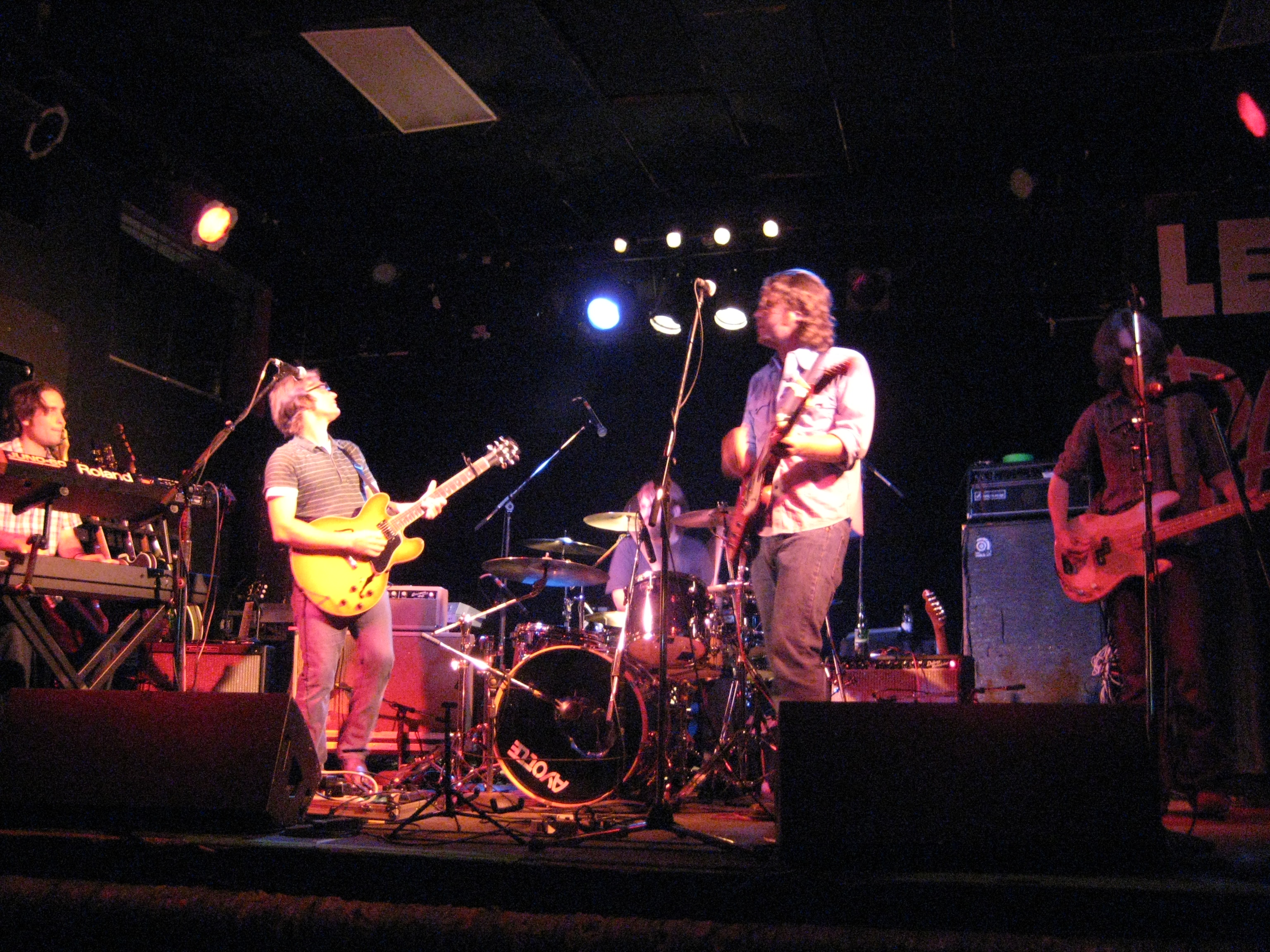
- The Broken West performing in Toronto

Background information
- Also known as: The Brokedown
- Origin: Los Angeles, California, U.S.
- Genres: Indie rock Power pop
- Years active: 2004–2009
- Label: Merge
- Past members: Ross Flournoy; Dan Iead; Brian Whelan; Rob McCorkindale; Scott Claassen; Jeff Howell; Sean McDonald; Jon Shaw

The Broken West was an American power pop band, formed in Los Angeles, California in 2004, and later signed to Merge Records. The members were Ross Flournoy (guitar, vocals), Dan Iead (guitar, backing vocals), Brian Whelan (bass, backing vocals), Rob McCorkindale (drums, percussion), and Scott Claassen (keys, backing vocals). Drummer Rob McCorkindale was later replaced by Sean McDonald. Jeff Howell (Dan Iead's high school friend from Connecticut) joined the Broken West as their touring keyboardist, playing synth, organ and piano.

== History ==
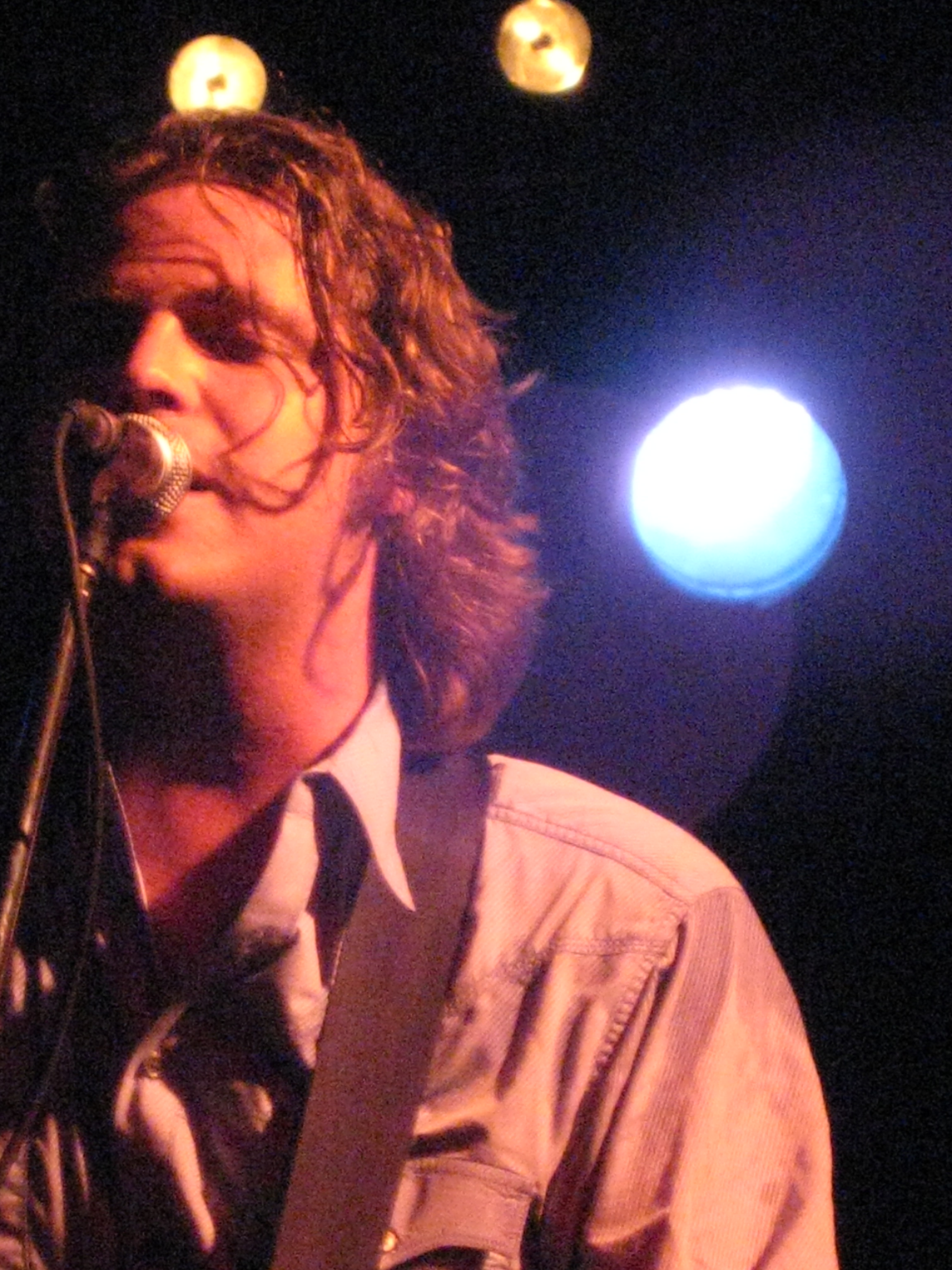
Lead singer Ross Flournoy

Initially called "The Brokedown," the group changed their name in 2006 because of legal concerns with a Chicago band with a similar name. Their debut full-length release is I Can't Go On, I'll Go On, referencing a Samuel Beckett quote.

Their single "Down in the Valley" was featured in an episode of Grey's Anatomy.

They have played the Austin City Limits Music Festival, and toured the U.S. and Canada with Fountains of Wayne and with The National.

None of the band members were originally from Los Angeles. Frontman Ross Flournoy was born in Memphis, Tennessee and moved with his family to Santa Barbara, California when he was 11 years old. His musical pleasures growing up included Big Star, Teenage Fanclub, and The Beatles. Dan Iead and Jeff Howell grew up in Branford, Connecticut. Brian Whelan split time between Seattle and Northern California.

The band's second album Now or Heaven was released in 2008 through Merge Records.

The band has broken up and Ross Flournoy released his first record as Apex Manor on January 25, 2011, also on Merge Records. The band's song "Perfect Games", and other songs, has been used as background music for local forecast segments on the Weather Channel in 2012 and 2013.

== Discography ==
- 2005: The Dutchman's Gold EP (as The Brokedown)
- 2007: I Can't Go On, I'll Go On
- 2008: Now or Heaven
