= The Ladybug Transistor =

Indie pop group

- Origin: Brooklyn, New York, US
- Genres: Indie Pop, baroque pop, sunshine pop revival
- Years active: 1995–present
- Labels: Merge, Low Transit Industries
- Members: Gary Olson; Julia Rydholm; Kyle Forester; Michael O'Neill; Eric Farber; Mark Dzula; Jeff Baron; Sasha Bell; Jennifer Baron; Derek Almstead
- Past members: Ben Crum; San Fadyl; Edward Powers; Javier Villegas

The Ladybug Transistor is a Brooklyn-based indie pop group associated with the Elephant Six Collective.

== History ==
Started in 1995 by Gary Olson, Edward Powers and Javier Villegas, the Ladybug Transistor released Marlborough Farms the same year on the Park N' Ride record label, adding and subtracting a couple of members and going on an international tour. With Jeff Baron (Guppyboy, the Essex Green) and Jennifer Baron (Saturnine) added to the line-up, they released Beverley Atonale in 1997, this time on Merge Records. Powers left the band and the remaining members, with San Fadyl and Sasha Bell of the Essex Green and the solo act Finishing School, embarked on a United States tour.

With a more stable line-up, the band released The Albemarle Sound in 1999, and added the violinist and bass guitarist Julia Rydholm (the Four Corners, the Essex Green, Jens Lekman) to the line-up. In 2001, Argyle Heir was released. In 2003, the band recorded a self-titled album at WaveLab Studio with engineer Craig Schumacher in Tucson, Arizona. In 2006, the band contributed heavily to the recording of Kevin Ayers' album The Unfairground, which Gary Olson produced. In April 2006, Fadyl began fighting serious asthma attacks. On April 26, 2007, he died from one such attack.

The band released its sixth album, Can't Wait Another Day, on June 5, 2007. This line-up included Kyle Forester (Crystal Stilts) and Ben Crum of Great Lakes.

For their seventh album, Clutching Stems, Olson, Forester and Rydholm gathered new recruits Mark Dzula (the Magic Caravan, Jukebox Radio), Eric Farber (the Lisps), and Michael O'Neill (MEN). The album, recorded at Marlborough Farms (studio) and Sunset Cottage, Poconos, was released on June 6, 2011, by Merge Records.

== Discography ==
=== Albums ===
- Marlborough Farms (1995)
- Beverley Atonale (1997)
- The Albemarle Sound (1999)
- Argyle Heir (2001)
- The Ladybug Transistor (2003)
- Can't Wait Another Day (2007)
- Clutching Stems (2011)
