= The Rock*A*Teens =

American indie rock band

- Origin: Cabbagetown, Atlanta, Georgia, United States
- Genres: Indie rock
- Years active: 1994 – 2002, 2014 – present
- Labels: Daemon Records; Merge Records
- Members: Justin Davis Hughes; William Joiner; Ballard Lesemann; Christopher Lopez
- Past members: Kelly Hogan; Chris Verene; Jeff Patch; William Brandon Smith

The Rock*A*Teens is an American indie rock band from Cabbagetown, Atlanta, Georgia, United States, who were active during most of the 1990s and reformed in 2014.

== History ==
The Rock*A*Teens began work on April 1, 1994 in Cabbagetown. The lineup consisted of Chris Lopez (lead vocals, guitar, keyboard), Justin Davis Hughes (guitar, piano, organ, backing vocals), Kelly Hogan (guitar, backing vocals) and Chris Verene (drums). They were later signed to Daemon Records and released two records, the self-titled debut and Cry. Kelly Hogan and Chris Verene quit in the summer of 1997 and were replaced by Jeff Patch and Brandon Smith. The band signed to Merge Records, and two singles were released, one on Merge and the other on Kill Rock Stars. (All four songs were re-recorded for the first Merge full length Baby A Little Rain Must Fall by the trio of Lopez, Smith and Hughes. The two separate versions of "Ether Sunday", when played simultaneously, sync up perfectly). Jeff Patch offered his resignation during the return from the first west coast tour with new friends Superchunk, after having blown the transmission of their van "Big Gary" during a side trip to Yellowstone. Subsequently, Chris Verene returned to the band for a brief period, including a SXSW performance in 1998 and related visits to Houston and New Orleans. He was replaced by T. Ballard Lesemann III in early summer 1998, after he had demonstrated his ability to perform most songs from memory without having practiced them. He was immediately signed up for a summer 1998 tour headlining the entire country. Afterwards, this line up recorded the second Merge album, Golden Time. Following a national tour with Man Or Astroman, Brandon Smith exited the group, originally to be replaced by Hayden from Servotron, who turned out to be wanted by the law. A few weeks before a tour with Superchunk, a soon to be prominent local lawyer named William Joiner joined the group and stayed the last few years of the band, recording Sweet Bird of Youth, their last album for some while, and an EP for Atlanta label Moodswing Records called Noon Under the Trees, as well as going on multiple tours.

The Winter 2015 issue of Oxford American featured a story by Abigail Covington about the Rock*A*Teens.

Their sixth album, Sixth House was released in June 2018. AllMusic noted that "Sixth House is less manic than the Rock*A*Teens of yore, but this music still generates the vague but uncomfortable feeling that something could leap out and grab you by the face at any moment..."

== Discography ==
- The Rock*A*Teens (January 23, 1996)
- Cry (February 18, 1997)
- Baby, A Little Rain Must Fall (April 21, 1998)
- Golden Time (March 23, 1999)
- Sweet Bird of Youth (October 3, 2000)
- Noon Under the Trees EP (2001)
- Sixth House (July 6, 2018)
