= Matt Suggs =

American indie rock musician

Matt Suggs is an American indie rock musician.

Born and raised in Visalia, California, Suggs was a member of Butterglory in the 1990s before launching a solo career in 2000. He released two albums on Merge Records, which Richie Unterberger described as "reminiscent of...The Kinks' Ray Davies". Later in the 2000s he was a founding member of White Whale.

== Discography ==
- Golden Days Before They End (Merge Records, 2000)
- Amigo Row (Merge, 2003)
