= A Giant Dog =

American punk rock band

- Origin: Austin, Texas, United States
- Genres: Punk rock
- Years active: 2008–present
- Labels: Sundae Records; Tic Tac Totally Records; Merge Records
- Members: Sabrina Ellis; Andrew Cashen; Andy Bauer; Graham Low; Daniel Blanchard
- Past members: Orville Neeley; Matthew Strmiska
- Website: agiantdog.bandcamp.com

A Giant Dog is an American punk rock band from Austin, Texas. It has been described by Bandcamp Daily as "one of Austin's most thrillingly irreverent bands". It consists of Sabrina Ellis, Andrew Cashen, Andy Bauer, Graham Low, and Daniel Blanchard.

== History ==
Sabrina Ellis and Andrew Cashen first connected as teenagers in Houston, bonding over what Ellis later described as their shared status as "misfits" who struggled to fit in at school. Along with drummer Orville Neeley, they formed A Giant Dog in Austin in 2008. The band released the debut album Fight in 2012. In 2013, the band released Bone. In 2016, they signed with Merge Records. The band's third album, Pile, was released on Merge Records in 2016. The band's fourth album, Toy, was released on Merge Records in 2017. In 2019, they released a full-album cover of Arcade Fire's 2007 release Neon Bible.

In 2023, A Giant Dog released their sixth studio album, Bite, their first album of original material in six years following Toy. Developed over several years, and recorded at La Cuve Studio in Angers, France, the album was conceived as a science fiction–themed concept album centered on gender dysphoria and set in a virtual world called Avalonia.

Outside of A Giant Dog, Ellis and Cashen also perform together in the rock band Sweet Spirit.

== Members ==
Current

- Sabrina Ellis – vocals
- Andrew Cashen – vocals, guitar
- Andy Bauer – guitar
- Graham Low – bass guitar
- Daniel Blanchard – drums

Former

- Orville Neeley
- Matthew Strmiska

== Discography ==
Albums

- Fight (2012)
- Bone (2013)
- Pile (2016)
- Toy (2017)
- Neon Bible (2019)
- Bite (2023)

EPs

- House (2010)
- Raw (2024)

Singles

- "The Grand" b/w "QYJARA" (2010)
- "Dammit Pomegranate" b/w "Can't Complain" (2012)
- "Suddenly Seymour" (2021)
