= Merge Records =

American independent record label

- Parent company: Secretly Group (50%; 2025—present)
- Founded: 1989
- Founder: Laura Ballance; Mac McCaughan
- Distributor: Secretly Distribution
- Genre: Indie rock; alternative rock; hip-hop
- Country of origin: United States
- Location: Durham, North Carolina
- Official website: mergerecords.com

Merge Records is an independent record label based in Durham, North Carolina. It was founded in 1989 by Laura Ballance and Mac McCaughan. It began as an outlet for music from their band Superchunk and music created by friends, and has expanded to include artists from around the world, with records reaching the top of the Billboard music charts.

== History ==
In the summer of 1989, North Carolina musicians Laura Ballance and Mac McCaughan drove to Seattle to visit the Sub Pop office, an independent record label. A friend of theirs introduced them to Sub Pop founders Bruce Pavitt and Jonathan Poneman, who in turn gave them a tour of the office and tickets to a Mudhoney and Nirvana show. Inspired by their visit, Ballance and McCaughan decided to create their own record label. The two felt confident as they already had experience recording music with bands like Bricks and Metal Pitcher, and McCaughan curated a box set of songs from local bands in the Research Triangle region. McCaughan noted the decision to start a label was primarily to make it easier for him and his friends to release music, instead of relying on major labels who might not notice them. Ballance came up with the name Merge Records, based on the merge traffic signs she saw while driving through Colorado.

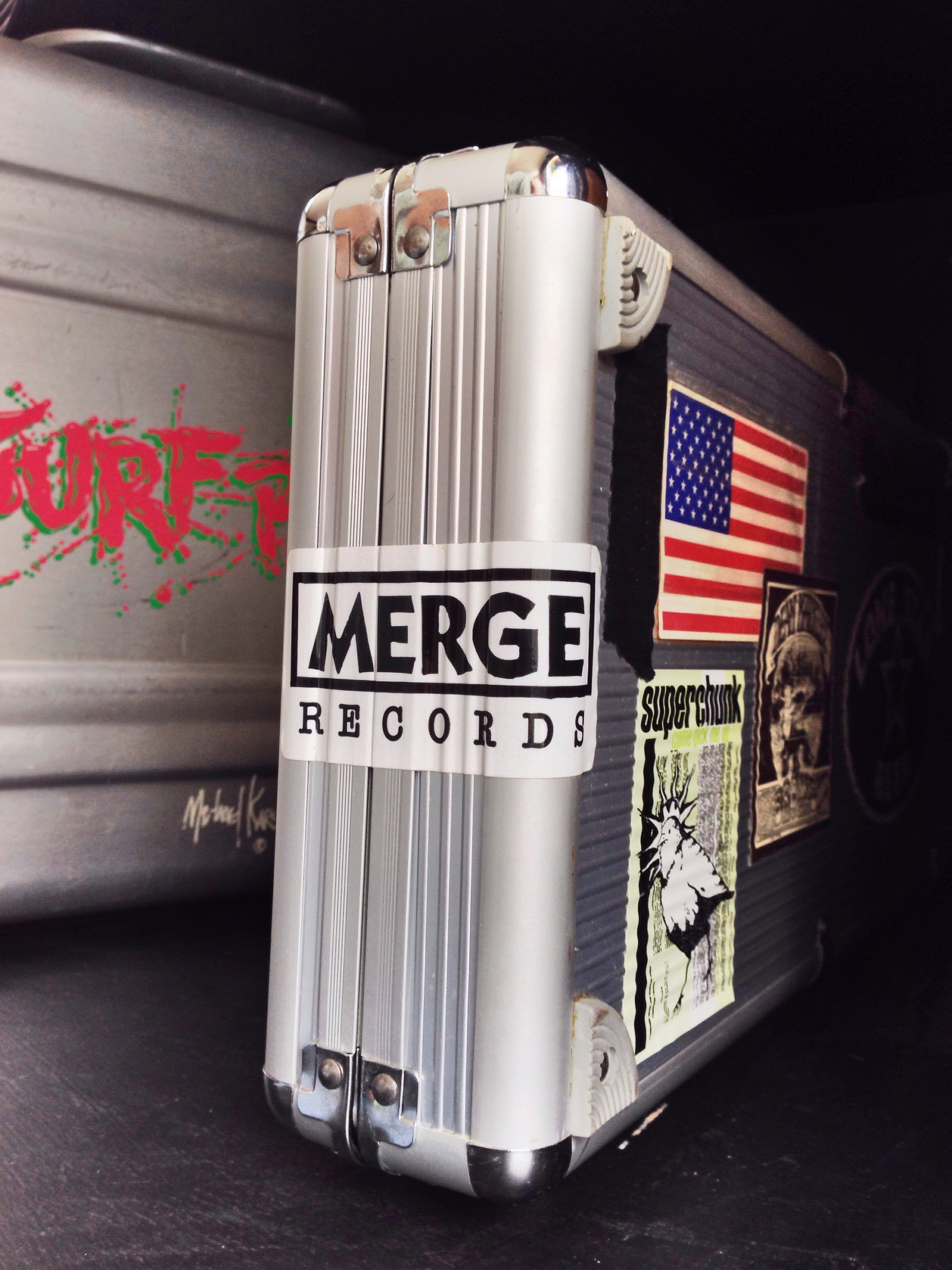
A Merge Records sticker displayed on a guitar case.

Merge Records began as a small-scale business that only put out 7-inch singles. Ballance operated the label in her bedroom, and with the help of McCaughan's contacts at Schoolkids Records, developed relationships with distributors. After releasing a number of 7-inch singles, the first Merge Records full-length CD release came on April 1, 1992, with MRG020 Superchunk—Tossing Seeds, the band's first collection of singles.

Merge's early successes included Neutral Milk Hotel's In the Aeroplane over the Sea, The Magnetic Fields' 69 Love Songs, and Spoon's Kill the Moonlight.

The label's first album to reach the Billboard 200 was Arcade Fire's Funeral, a 2004 release. Arcade Fire gave the label its then highest-charting release with their follow-up, 2007's Neon Bible, which debuted at #2 on the Billboard 200, and, later, reaching #1 with their third album, 2010's The Suburbs. Other Billboard Top Ten releases include Spoon's Ga Ga Ga Ga Ga and Transference, along with She & Him's (actress/musician Zooey Deschanel along with M. Ward, a popular Merge folk musician) Volume Two. Other notable Merge releases include Caribou's Polaris Prize-winning Andorra, M. Ward's Hold Time, Camera Obscura's Let's Get Out of This Country, and She & Him's Volume One.

In February 2009, due to adverse market conditions it was announced that Touch and Go Records would no longer manufacture and distribute records for Merge and many other independent record labels; Merge had been "under the Touch and Go umbrella" ever since its 1992 release of Tossing Seeds. Merge quickly reached an agreement with the Alternative Distribution Alliance to continue distribution of its releases.

In September 2009, Algonquin Paperbacks released Our Noise: The Story of Merge Records, a book chronicling the label's history. This followed a 6-day music festival in Chapel Hill and Carrboro, NC, featuring over 40 Merge acts from around the world celebrating the 20th anniversary of the label's first release. The label also released a subscription-only 17-disc box set SCORE! 20 Years of Merge Records throughout the 20th anniversary year curated by pop culture tastemakers such as David Byrne, Amy Poehler, Zach Galifianakis, Jonathan Lethem, Peter Buck, David Chang, Mindy Kaling and more, with all proceeds going to charities.

In August 2010, Merge Records released Arcade Fire's The Suburbs to critical acclaim, preceding the band's headlining appearance at Lollapalooza. The album went straight to number one on the U.S. and U.K. charts. Famed director and Monty Python member Terry Gilliam also directed a live online broadcast of the band's concert from the historic Madison Square Garden in New York following the album's release, which was streamed live by an estimated 1.8 million unique viewers. The Suburbs won the Grammy for Album of the Year at the 53rd Annual Grammy Awards on February 13, 2011.

On June 10, 2025, Secretly Group purchased a 50% stake in Merge Records after years of handling their distribution. In the same press release, Merge announced the departure of co-owner Laura Ballance, who had been with the label since its inception in 1989. Mac McCaughan remains the sole president and head of A&R.

== Artists ==
List of artists adapted from Merge Records website.

- The 3Ds
- The 6ths
- A Giant Dog
- American Music Club
- Amor De Días
- Angels of Epistemology
- Apex Manor
- Arcade Fire
- Archers of Loaf
- Ashley Stove
- Eric Bachmann
- Lou Barlow
- Barren Girls
- Beatnik Filmstars
- Dan Bejar
- Big Dipper
- Breadwinner
- Bricks
- The Broken West
- Richard Buckner
- Will Butler
- Butterglory
- Buzzcocks
- Cable Ties
- The Cakekitchen
- Camera Obscura
- Caribou
- The Clean
- The Clientele
- Hollie Cook
- Mikal Cronin
- Crooked Fingers
- Allison Crutchfield
- Daphni
- Destroyer
- Dinosaur Jr
- Divine Fits
- Drive Like Jehu
- East River Pipe
- Mark Eitzel
- Matt Elliott
- Erectus Monotone
- The Essex Green
- Ex Hex
- The Extra Lens
- Flesh Wounds
- Flock of Dimes
- Martin Frawley
- Eleanor Friedberger
- Friendship
- Fruit Bats
- Fucked Up
- Future Bible Heroes
- Ganger
- Gauche
- The Gothic Archies
- Guv'ner
- Coco Hames
- Annie Hayden
- HeCTA
- Hiss Golden Messenger
- Honor Role
- Hospitality
- Benji Hughes
- Ibibio Sound Machine
- Imperial Teen
- Jade Hairpins
- The Karl Hendricks Trio
- David Kilgour
- King Khan and the Shrines
- Julian Koster
- Mike Krol
- The Ladybug Transistor
- Lambchop
- Let's Wrestle
- Little Scream
- The Love Language
- The Mad Scene
- The Magnetic Fields
- Mac McCaughan
- H.C. McEntire
- Stephin Merritt
- Bob Mould
- Mount Moriah
- The Mountain Goats
- Mt. Wilson Repeater
- The Music Tapes
- Neutral Milk Hotel
- The New Pornographers
- Oakley Hall
- Conor Oberst
- Ought
- Pipe
- Robert Pollard
- Polvo
- Portastatic
- Pram
- Previous Industries
- Radar Bros.
- Redd Kross
- Reigning Sound
- Dawn Richard
- Dawn Richard and Spencer Zahn
- Brendan Reed
- The Rock*A*Teens
- The Rosebuds
- Sacred Paws
- Saint Rich
- Seaweed
- Shark Quest
- She & Him
- Shout Out Louds
- Sneaks
- Spaceheads
- Spent
- Spider Bags
- The Spinanes
- Spoon
- Sugar
- Matt Suggs
- Superchunk
- Swearin'
- Sweet Spirit
- Tall Dwarfs
- Teenage Fanclub
- Telekinesis
- Tenement Halls
- The Third Eye Foundation
- Tracey Thorn
- Times New Viking
- Mary Timony
- Titus Andronicus
- TORRES
- Tracyanne & Danny
- Twerps
- William Tyler
- Versus
- Vertical Scratchers
- Volcano Suns
- M. Ward
- Waxahatchee
- White Whale
- Wild Flag
- Wwax
- Wye Oak

== See also ==
- Merge Records discography
