= Superchunk discography =

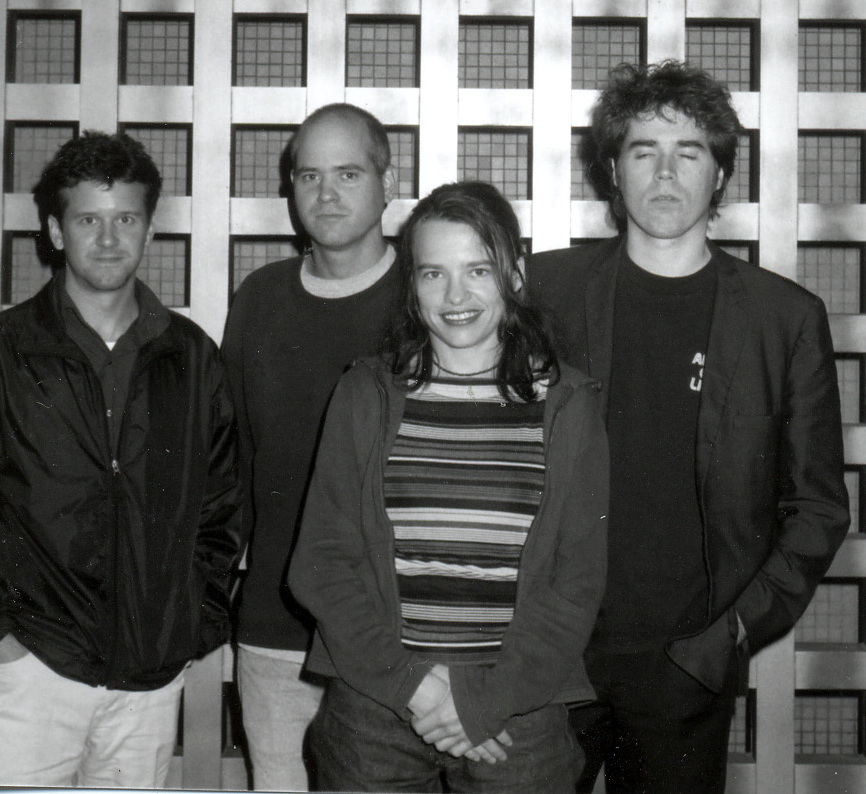
- Superchunk in 2001
- Studio albums: 13
- Extended plays: 8
- Live albums: 3
- Compilation albums: 4
- Singles: 29
- Music videos: 13
- Soundtrack and compilation appearances: 17

The discography of American indie rock band Superchunk consists of thirteen studio albums, eight extended plays, four compilation albums, twenty-nine singles, three live albums, thirteen music videos, and contributions to seventeen soundtracks and other compilations.

== Albums ==
List of albums, with selected peak chart positions
Title	Year	Label	Charts
Superchunk	1990; 1999	Matador; Merge	US CMJ #58
No Pocky for Kitty	1991; 1999	Matador; Merge	
Tossing Seeds (Singles 89–91)	1992	Merge	
On the Mouth	1993; 1999	Matador; Merge	
Foolish	1994	Merge	US CMJ #6
Incidental Music 1991–95	1995	Merge	US CMJ #6
Here's Where the Strings Come In	1995	Merge	US CMJ #3
Indoor Living	1997	Merge	US CMJ #4
Come Pick Me Up	1999	Merge	
Here's to Shutting Up	2001	Merge	US CMJ #4
The Clambakes Series Vol. 1	2002	Merge	
The Clambakes Series Vol. 2	2002	Merge	
Cup of Sand	2003	Merge	
The Clambakes Series Vol. 3	2004	Merge	
Majesty Shredding	2010	Merge	US #85
I Hate Music	2013	Merge	US #74
What a Time to Be Alive	2018	Merge	US #182 UK #23
Wild Loneliness	2022	Merge	UK Indie #13
Misfits & Mistakes: Singles, B-Sides & Strays 2007–2023	2023	Merge	
Songs in the Key of Yikes	2025	Merge	

== 7" singles and EPs ==
List of 7-inch singles and EPs
Title	Track listing	Release date	Label
What I Do [as Chunk]	"What Do I" "My Noise" "Train From Kansas City" (Shangri-Las cover)	1989	Merge
Slack Motherfucker	"Slack Motherfucker" "Night Creatures"	1989	Merge
Tower	"Fishing" "Tower" "Train from Kansas City" "What Do I"	1991	Messiah Complex
Fishing	"Fishing" "Cool"	1991	Merge
The Breadman	"The Breadman" "Cast Iron"	1991	Matador
The Freed Seed	"Seed Toss" "It's So Hard to Fall in Love" (Sebadoh cover) "Brand New Love" (Sebadoh cover) "I Believe in Fate" (Sebadoh cover)	1991	Merge
On Paper it Made Perfect Sense	"Driveway to Driveway" "Driveway to Driveway" (Acoustic) "Seed Toss" (Acoustic) "Sick to Move" (Acoustic) "You Cheat Yourself of Everything That Moves" (Live) "Fishing" (Live) "The Only Piece That You Get" (Live)	1992	Fellaheen
Mower	"Mower" "On the Mouth"	1992	Merge
The Question Is How Fast	"The Question Is How Fast" "100,000 Fireflies" (The Magnetic Fields cover)	1992	Merge
Ribbon	"Ribbon" "Who Needs Light"	1993	Merge
Merge 50	"Precision Auto part 2" "Precision Auto part 3" (Mark Robinson remix)	1994	Merge
The First Part	"The First Part" "Connecticut"	1994	Merge
Driveway to Driveway	"Driveway to Driveway" "Driveway" (Acoustic) "Sick to Move" (Acoustic)	1994	Merge
One-sided 7" incl w/ Speed Kills fanzine #6	"Home at Dawn"	1995	Speed Kills
Hyper Enough	"Hyper Enough" "Never Too Young to Smoke"	1995	Merge
Watery Hands	"Watery Hands" "With Bells On"	1997	Merge
The Majestic	"The Majestic" "Reg"	1999	Merge
Misfits and Mistakes	"Misfits and Mistakes"	2007	Merge
Crossed Wires	"Crossed Wires" "Blinders (Fast Vers.)"	2009	Merge
Digging for Something	"Digging for Something" "February Punk"	2010	Merge
Learned to Surf	"Learned to Surf" "Sunny Brixton" "Bad Influence" (Neon Christ cover)	2011	Merge; One Four Seven
This Summer	"This Summer" "Cruel Summer" (Bananarama cover)	2012	Merge
Void b/w Faith	"Void" "Faith"	2013	Merge
I Got Cut	"I Got Cut" "Up Against the Wall"	2017	Merge
Break the Glass	"Break the Glass" "Mad World" (Corrosion of Conformity cover)	2017	Merge
There's a Ghost	"There's a Ghost" "Alice" (The Sisters of Mercy cover)	2020	Merge

== CD singles and EPs ==
List of CD singles and EPs
Title	Track listing	Release date	Label
Mower	"Mower" "On the Mouth" "Fishing" (Live)	1992	Merge
Question Is How Fast	"Question Is How Fast" "Forged It" "100,000 Fireflies"	1992	Merge
Hit Self-Destruct	"Cadmium" "Throwing Things" (Acoustic) "Lying in State" (The Verlaines cover)	1992	Hippy Knight Records
The First Part	"The First Part" "Foolish" "Connecticut"	1994	Merge
Driveway to Driveway	"Driveway to Driveway" "Driveway to Driveway" (Acoustic) "Seed Toss" (Acoustic) "Sick to Move" (Acoustic)	1994	Merge
Hyper Enough	"Hyper Enough" "Never Too Young to Smoke" "Detroit Has a Skyline" (acoustic)	1995	Merge
The Laughter Guns EP	"A Small Definition" "Her Royal Fisticuffs" "The Mine Has Been Returned to Its Original Owner" "Hero"	1996	Merge
Watery Hands	"Watery Hands" "Watery Hands" (Wet Wurlitzer mix)	1997	Merge
Hello Hawk	"Hello Hawk" "Sexy Ankles" "Low Branches" (Acoustic) "Pink Clouds" (Acoustic) "Cursed Mirror" (Acoustic)	1999	Merge
1,000 Lbs EP	"1,000 Lbs" "White Noise" "Scary Monsters" "1,000 Pounds" (Acoustic)	2000	Merge
Late Century Dream EP	"Late Century Dream" "The Length of Las Ramblas" "Becoming a Speck" "Florida's on Fire" (Acoustic demo)	2001	Merge
Art Class EP	"Art Class (Song for Yayoi Kusama)" "The Hot Break" "A Collection of Accounts" "Art Class" (Acoustic)	2001	Merge
Leaves in the Gutter EP	"Learned to Surf" "Misfits and Mistakes" "Screw It Up" "Knock Knock Knock" "Learned to Surf" (Acoustic Demo)	2009	Merge

== Digital singles ==
List of digital singles
Title	Track listing	Release date	Label
Digging for Something	"Digging for Something" "February Punk" "Digging for Something" (Acoustic Demo)	2010	Merge
Crossed Wires	"Crossed Wires" (single version) "Blinders" (Fast Version) "Crossed Wires" (Acoustic Demo)	2011	Merge

=== Appearances on compilations, soundtracks and splits ===
List of appearances on compilations and soundtracks
Compilation/Soundtrack/Split	Track listing	Release date	Label
Three's Company (split w/ Geek and Seaweed)	"Garlic"	1990	Merge
Throw	"Skip Steps 1&3"	1991	Yo-Yo
Pyloric Waves	"Invitation"	1991	D-Tox
Teriyaki Asthma	"I'll Be Your Sister" (Motörhead cover)	1992	C/Z
Fortune Cookie Prize	"Nancy Sin" (Beat Happening cover)	1992	Simple Machines
Freedom of Choice	"Girl U Want" (Devo cover)	1992	Tannis Root
Inclined Plane	"Baxter"	1993	Simple Machines
Dope Guns 'n Fucking in the Streets Vol. 8 7"	"Basement Life"	1993	Amphetamine Reptile
December (split 7" w/ Caterpillar)	"Night Of Chill Blue" (The Chills cover)	1993	Simple Machines
The Machines: Simple Machines 7"s (1990-1993)	"Baxter"	1994	Simple Machines
Working Holiday!	"Night Of Chill Blue" "From the Curve" (Live)	1994	Simple Machines
Rows of Teeth	"Dance Lessons"	1994	Merge
Kicked In/She Cracked (split 7" w/ Tsunami)	"Kicked In" (Acoustic)	1995	Honey Bear
Jerky Boys	"Shallow End"	1995	Atlantic
Suburbia	"Does Your Hometown Care"	1996	DGC
Lounge Ax Defense Fund	"Fader Rules"	1996	Touch & Go
Laugh Hard at the Absurdly Evil	"Hyper Enough"	1996	X-Wing Recordings

== Videos ==
List of music videos
Title	Director
Cast Iron	Alan Hervey
Throwing Things	Jesse Peretz
Mower	Norwood Cheek
Fishing	Phil Morrison
Precision Auto	Norwood Cheek
Untied	Phil Morrison
Package Thief	Peyton Reed
The First Part	Phil Morrison and Peyton Reed
Driveway to Driveway	Peyton Reed and Phil Morrison
Hyper Enough	Norwood Cheek
Watery Hands	Phil Morrison
Digging for Something	Scott Jacobson
Crossed Wires	Whitey McConnaughy
