= Cup of Sand =

Compilation album by Superchunk
- Released: 2003
- Recorded: Various
- Genre: Indie rock; punk rock
- Label: Merge
- Producer: Various

Superchunk chronology
The Clambakes Series Vol. 2 (2002)	Cup of Sand (2003)	The Clambakes Series Vol. 3 (2004)

Professional ratings
Review scores
Source	Rating
AllMusic	4/5 stars
Pitchfork Media	(8.4/10)

Cup of Sand is a two-CD collection of singles, B-sides and various rarities (including an Adam Ant cover and a David Bowie cover) released by Superchunk in 2003. The accompanying booklet is particularly large, as band members Mac McCaughan, Jim Wilbur, Laura Ballance and Jon Wurster weigh in with what they remember (or don't remember) about the songs.

== Background ==
"Her Royal Fisticuffs" is the band's attempt at emulating The Mice. "The Mine Has Been Returned To Its Original Owner" features McCaughan on organ and a "Breadwinner-inspired" bassline by Ballance. According to McCaughan, the song is "a fiction involving a gardener, illegitimate children, and some sort of gothic family murder mystery".

"Dance Lessons", "Basement Life", and "Still Feed Myself" were recorded during the Foolish sessions at Pachyderm Studios. "Still Feed Myself" is, in McCaughan's words, an "anti-music biz invective".

"Fader Rules" and "Never Too Young to Smoke" are outtakes from the Here's Where the Strings Come In sessions. The opening chords of "Fader Rules" were taken from Here Comes My Girl, while the drum pattern was "completely lifted" from The Afghan Whigs song "Miles Iz Ded".

"Does Your Hometown Care?" was on the soundtrack to the 1996 film SubUrbia. McCaughan describes the song as "our best Versus rip-off ever".

"The Length of Las Ramblas" features Ballance on the Moog synthesizer.

"Freaks in Charge" was written shortly before the 2004 United States presidential election, and is about "raising kids in a world run by monsters".

The cover of "Blending In" by Government Issue was recorded during the On the Mouth sessions and features Wilbur on lead vocals. Wurster describes it as "a tribute of sorts to our hardcore roots".

== Track listing ==
=== Disc one ===
1. "The Majestic"
2. "Reg"
3. "Her Royal Fisticuffs"
4. "The Mine Has Been Returned To Its Original Owner"
5. "A Small Definition"
6. "Dance Lessons"
7. "Basement Life"
8. "Still Feed Myself"
9. "Fader Rules"
10. "Never Too Young To Smoke"
11. "Detroit Has A Skyline (acoustic)"
12. "Does Your Hometown Care?"

=== Disc two ===
1. "Beat My Guest"
2. "With Bells On"
3. "Clover"
4. "Sexy Ankles"
5. "White Noise"
6. "Thin Air"
7. "Scary Monsters (and Super Creeps)"
8. "1,000 Pounds (Duck Kee style)"
9. "The Length Of Las Ramblas"
10. "Becoming A Speck"
11. "The Hot Break"
12. "A Collection Of Accounts"
13. "Blending In" (Government Issue cover)
