= Mac McCaughan =

American musician and record label owner (born 1967)

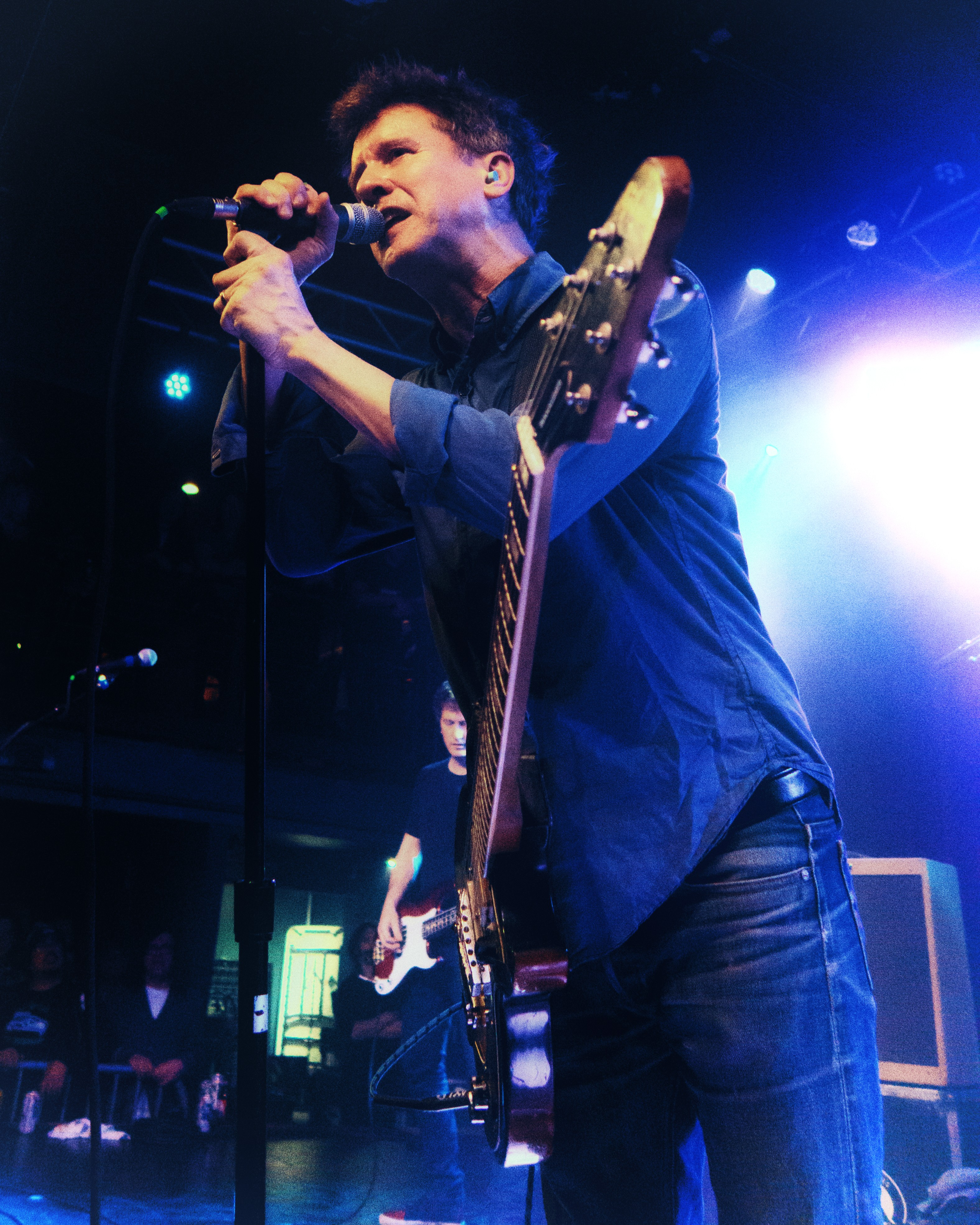
- McCaughan in 2018

Background information
- Born: July 12, 1967 (age 59); Fort Lauderdale, Florida, U.S.
- Genres: Indie rock; punk rock; alternative rock; lo-fi
- Occupations: Musician; songwriter; co-founder of Merge Records
- Instruments: Vocals; guitar; drums
- Labels: Merge; Matador
- Member of: Portastatic; Superchunk
- Formerly of: Bricks; Go Back Snowball; Metal Pitcher; Seam; Slushpuppies; Wwax

Ralph Lee "Mac" McCaughan (/məˈkɑːn/; born July 12, 1967) is an American musician and record label owner, based in North Carolina. His main musical projects have been Superchunk since 1989, and Portastatic since the early 1990s. In 1989 he founded the independent record label Merge Records with Superchunk bandmate Laura Ballance.

== Musical history ==
As a child, McCaughan adored the classic rock of bands such as AC/DC and the Rolling Stones. In his teens, he was impacted by synthesizer-driven acts like New Order, OMD and Cocteau Twins. Other prominent influences have included R.E.M., Let's Active, Hüsker Dü, Sonic Youth and Minutemen.

McCaughan is a founding member of the rock band Superchunk. Formed in 1989, they are one of the bands that helped define the Chapel Hill music scene of the 1990s. Their energetic, high-velocity style and do-it-yourself ethics is influenced by punk rock. The band released a string of full-length albums and compilations throughout the '90s. After releasing their eighth studio album in 2001, the band went into a period of reduced activity. In 2010, the band released a new studio album Majesty Shredding and followed it up in 2013 with their tenth studio album, I Hate Music.

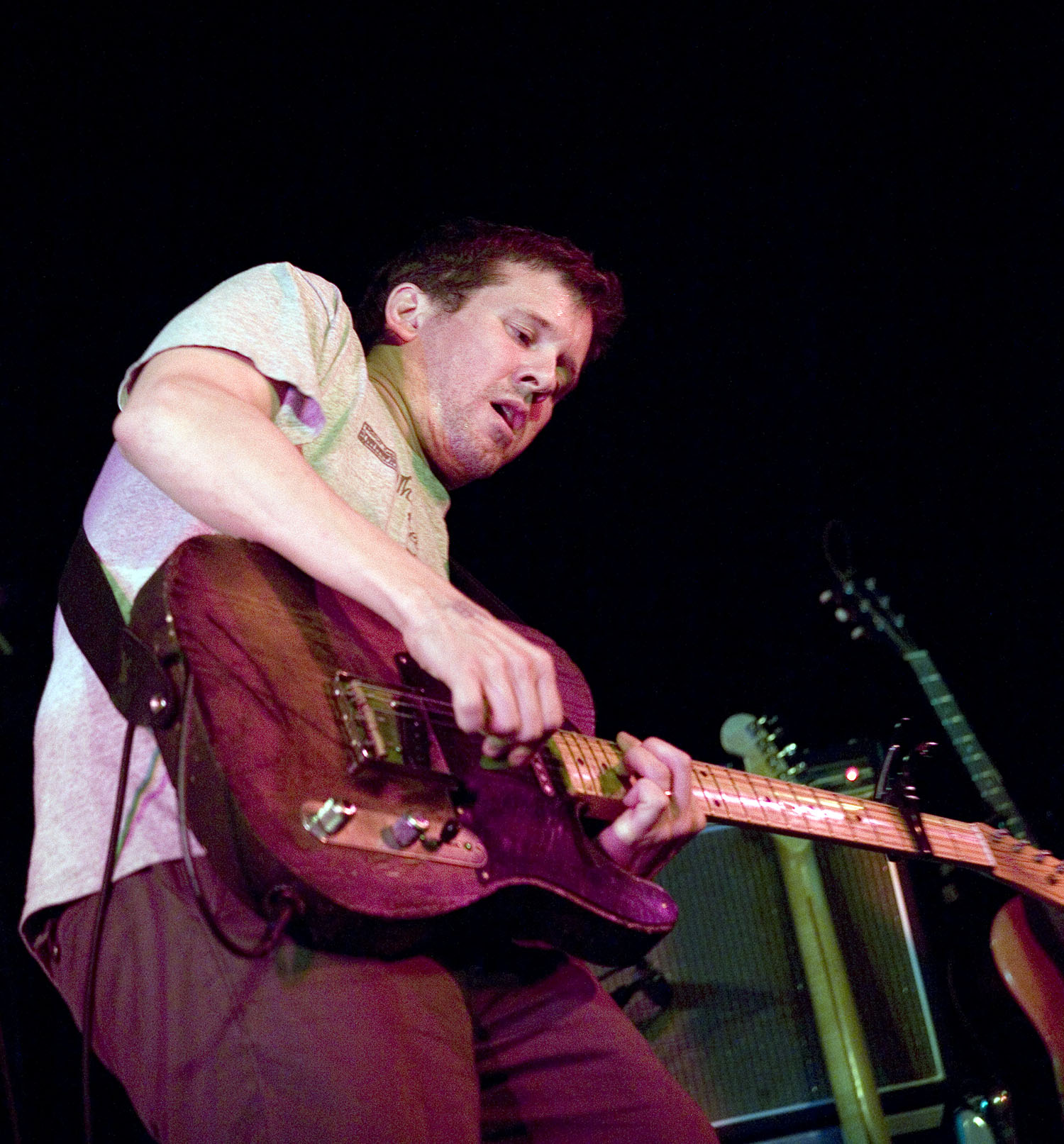
McCaughan performing with Portastatic in Washington, D.C., at Black Cat in 2005

He also heads the band Portastatic, which began as a lo-fi side project from Superchunk and has blossomed into his main musical project. Prior to this, he was the head of another lo-fi band named Bricks with Andrew Webster of Tsunami, Josh Phillips and Laura Cantrell. Other bands he played with prior to Superchunk include Slushpuppies, Wwax and Metal Pitcher (with Ballance).

In the early 1990s he was also the original drummer in the band Seam, which was formed in 1991 with former Bitch Magnet front man Sooyoung Park. He played on their debut album Headsparks and the Kernel EP.

In 2002, McCaughan teamed up with Robert Pollard of Guided by Voices to form the group Go Back Snowball. The duo recorded and released an album in 2002, titled Calling Zero. In the same year, he composed the score for Matt Bissonnette and Steven Clark's film Looking for Leonard.

== Merge Records ==
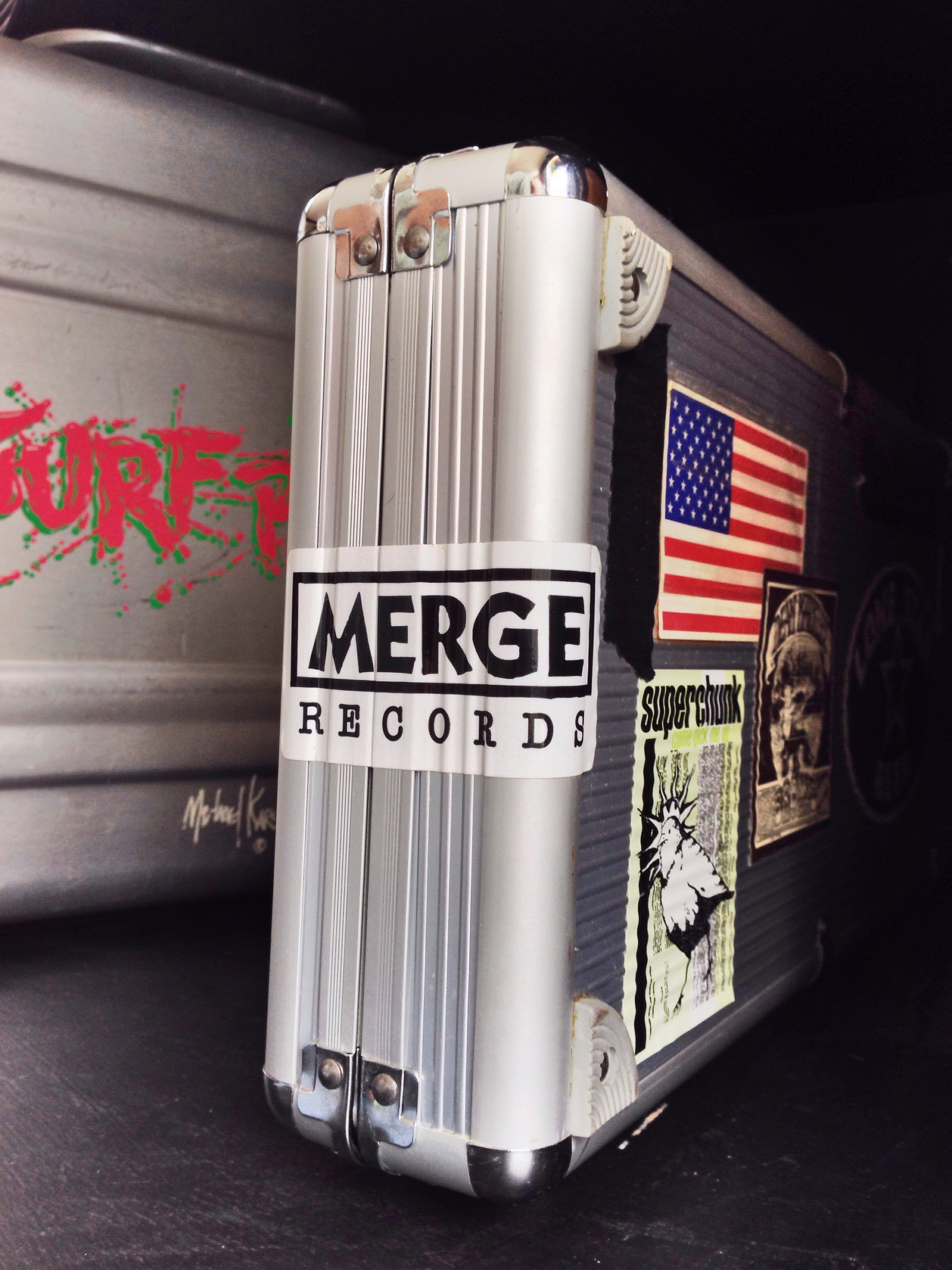

McCaughan and his Superchunk bandmate Laura Ballance co-founded the independent record label Merge Records in 1989 as a way to release music by Superchunk, and other artist friends. The label has been a significant success, releasing music by artists from around the world – a diverse "cross section of pop music, or at least alt or indie music," including titles by such bands as Arcade Fire, The Magnetic Fields and Spoon, and some of its releases reaching the top 10 on the Billboard music charts.

McCaughan was a contributor to the 2009 book Our Noise - The Story of Merge Records by John Cook.

== Other activity ==
On October 24, 2007, McCaughan gave expert witness testimony in the U.S. Senate Commerce Committee on the topic "The Future of Radio".

== Personal life ==
McCaughan lives in Chapel Hill, North Carolina with his wife and children. He graduated from Columbia College of Columbia University in 1990. McCaughan’s daughter Oona went to Tulane University and is a popular podcast host and content creator at Barstool Sports. His younger brother Matt McCaughan is a drummer best known for his work with Bon Iver.

== Discography ==
=== Superchunk ===
- Superchunk (1990)
- No Pocky for Kitty (1991)
- On the Mouth (1993)
- Foolish (1994)
- Here's Where the Strings Come In (1995)
- Indoor Living (1997)
- Come Pick Me Up (1999)
- Here's to Shutting Up (2001)
- Majesty Shredding (2010)
- I Hate Music (2013)
- What a Time to Be Alive (2018)
- Foolish AF (2019)
- Wild Loneliness (2022)
- Songs in the Key of Yikes (2025)

=== Portastatic ===
All releases on Merge Records.

- I Hope Your Heart Is Not Brittle (1994)
- Slow Note From a Sinking Ship (1995)
- The Nature of Sap (1997)
- Summer of the Shark (2003)
- Bright Ideas (2005)
- Be Still Please (2006)

=== Mac McCaughan ===
- Non-Believers (2015)
- Happy New Year (Prince Can't Die Again) (2016)
- New Rain Duets (with Mary Lattimore) (2019)
- The Sound of Yourself (2021)

=== Mac Krol ===
- For Some Other Reason (2023)
