= Majesty Shredding =

Studio album by Superchunk
- Released: September 14, 2010
- Studio: Overdub Lane, Durham, North Carolina
- Genre: Indie rock; alternative rock; punk rock
- Length: 41:44
- Label: Merge
- Producer: Scott Solter, Superchunk

Superchunk chronology
| The Clambakes Series Vol. 3 (2004) | Majesty Shredding (2010) | I Hate Music (2013) |

Majesty Shredding is the ninth studio album by American indie rock band Superchunk. It was released on September 14, 2010, on Merge Records. It is the group's first studio album since 2001's Here's to Shutting Up.

== Critical reception ==
Professional ratings
Aggregate scores
| Source | Rating |
|---|---|
| AnyDecentMusic? | 7.7/10 |
| Metacritic | 83/100 |
Review scores
| Source | Rating |
| AllMusic | 4/5 stars |
| Alternative Press | 4/5 stars |
| The A.V. Club | A |
| The Guardian | 5/5 stars |
| Mojo | 4/5 stars |
| MSN Music (Expert Witness) | A− |
| NME | 8/10 |
| Pitchfork | 8.0/10 |
| Rolling Stone | 4/5 stars |
| Spin | 7/10 |

On Metacritic Majesty Shredding has a score of 83 out of 100 based on 25 critics reviews, indicating "universal acclaim". Majesty Shredding was ranked number 25 on Rolling Stone's list of the 30 Best Albums of 2010.

Marc Hawthorne of The A.V. Club felt that the album was among the best work of the band's career, stating that "Majesty Shredding lives up to its name and doesn’t waste much time catching its breath, and along the way Superchunk delivers something that used to be expected of the band: an album on which every song sounds as inspired as the next one." Jon Dolan of Rolling Stone wrote: "No youngsters this side of Arcade Fire articulate ambivalence with such skill or heart. Few even try." Jessica Hopper of The Village Voice called the album "vigorous and kicking, much more so than you'd have right or reason to expect out of a band this deep into their career. A band still sparking with ideas. Two decades in, it's still duty now for the future." The New York Times' Jon Caramanica wrote that the band had "recaptured its grasp on bright, puckish and punkish power pop with no apparent effort." Critic Mischa Pearlman noted the album's bittersweet lyrical content in his review for BBC Music: "Although that jubilant, sunny feeling permeates all of these 11 songs, it's coupled with a sense of jaded, measured hindsight – that, despite the open, blue North Carolina sky above them and the youthful energy it inspires, you can't recapture the past."

== Track listing ==
All tracks are written by Mac McCaughan, Laura Ballance, Jon Wurster and Jim Wilbur.

Majesty Shredding track listing
| No. | Title | Length |
|---|---|---|
| 1. | "Digging for Something" | 3:30 |
| 2. | "My Gap Feels Weird" | 3:13 |
| 3. | "Rosemarie" | 4:15 |
| 4. | "Crossed Wires" | 3:48 |
| 5. | "Slow Drip" | 2:52 |
| 6. | "Fractures in Plaster" | 5:19 |
| 7. | "Learned to Surf" | 3:54 |
| 8. | "Winter Games" | 4:14 |
| 9. | "Rope Light" | 2:36 |
| 10. | "Hot Tubes" | 3:52 |
| 11. | "Everything at Once" | 4:19 |

== Personnel ==
Superchunk

- Mac McCaughan – vocals, guitar
- Laura Ballance – bass
- Jon Wurster – drums
- James Wilbur – guitar

Additional musicians

- John Darnielle – additional vocals on "Digging for Something"
- Mark Daumen – tuba on "Digging for Something"
- Matt Kenney – trumpet on "Digging for Something"
- Seamus Kenney – trombone on "Digging for Something"
- Kristen Beard – viola on "Fractures in Plaster"

Production

- Jeff Lipton – mastering
- John Plymale – engineering
- Maria Rice – mastering assistant
- Scott Solter – engineering, mixing

Design

- Jason Arthurs – band photography
- Maggie Fost – cover art, design
- Mac McCaughan – cover art
- PJ Sykes – photography
- Brian Vetter – photography

== Charts ==
Chart performance for Majesty Shredding
| Chart (2010) | Peak position |
|---|---|
| US Billboard 200 | 85 |
| US Independent Albums (Billboard) | 17 |
| US Top Alternative Albums (Billboard) | 21 |
| US Top Rock Albums (Billboard) | 33 |
