= Incidental Music 1991–95 =

Compilation album by Superchunk
- Released: 1995
- Recorded: 1990–1994
- Genre: Indie rock
- Label: Merge

Superchunk chronology
Foolish (1994)	Incidental Music 1991–95 (1995)	Here's Where the Strings Come In (1995)

Incidental Music 1991–95 is a collection of various b-sides and previously unreleased tracks by Superchunk. It was released by Merge Records in 1995. Despite the name of the collection, the songs included actually date from between 1990 and 1994.

A number of the tracks are covers: "100,000 Fireflies" is a song by The Magnetic Fields; "Lying in State" is a song by the Verlaines; "I'll Be Your Sister" was originally recorded by Motörhead; and "Night of Chill Blue" is a song by The Chills.

The unlisted track at the end of the album is an alternate version of "Precision Auto," which originally led off the band's third studio album, On the Mouth.

The cover art is credited to Mac McCaughan, the band's singer and guitarist.

== Track listing ==
1. "Shallow End" (1994)
2. "Mower" (1991)
3. "On the Mouth" (1991)
4. "Cadmium" (1992)
5. "Who Needs Light" (1993)
6. "Ribbon" (1993)
7. "Foolish" (1993)
8. "100,000 Fireflies" (1992)
9. "Invitation" (1991)
10. "Makeout Bench" (1990)
11. "Baxter" (1992)
12. "Connecticut" (1993)
13. "Lying in State" (1992)
14. "Throwing Things (acoustic)" (1992)
15. "I'll Be Your Sister" (1991)
16. "Night of Chill Blue" (1992)
17. "Forged It" (1992)
18. "Home at Dawn" (1993)
19. "Precision Auto"
