= Indoor Living =

Studio album by Superchunk
- Released: September 9, 1997
- Studio: Echo Park Studios, Bloomington, Indiana
- Genre: Indie rock
- Length: 48:39
- Label: Merge
- Producer: John Plymale, Superchunk

Superchunk chronology
Here's Where the Strings Come In (1995)	Indoor Living (1997)	Come Pick Me Up (1999)

Professional ratings
Review scores
Source	Rating
AllMusic	4/5 stars
The A.V. Club	A−
Chicago Tribune	3.5/4 stars
Entertainment Weekly	B+
NME	7/10
Pitchfork	7.6/10
The Rolling Stone Album Guide	3.5/5 stars
Select	3/5
Spin	8/10

Indoor Living is the sixth studio album by American indie rock band Superchunk, released on Merge Records in 1997. It was recorded at Echo Park Studios in Bloomington, Indiana, and mixed at Overdub Lane Recording Studio in Durham, North Carolina. The album was engineered by John Plymale and produced by Plymale and Superchunk.

A music video was released for "Watery Hands" featuring comedians David Cross and Janeane Garofalo.

== Track listing ==
All tracks written by Superchunk.

No.	Title	Length
1.	"Unbelievable Things"	5:21
2.	"Burn Last Sunday"	4:52
3.	"Marquee"	4:01
4.	"Watery Hands"	4:31
5.	"Nu Bruises"	2:41
6.	"Every Single Instinct"	4:07
7.	"Song for Marion Brown"	4:10
8.	"The Popular Music"	4:04
9.	"Under Our Feet"	3:37
10.	"European Medicine"	5:11
11.	"Martinis on the Roof"	5:57
Total length:		48:39

Japanese release bonus tracks

No.	Title	Length
12.	"Watery Hands" (Wet Wurlitzer Mix)
13.	"With Bells On"
14.	"Nu Bruises" (Screaming Wurster Mix)

The 2014 reissue includes a download code for the album and The Clambakes Volume 8: We'd Like to Thank the Homecoming Committee live album.

== Personnel ==
Superchunk

- Laura Ballance
- Jim Wilbur
- Jon Wurster
- Mac McCaughan

Production

- John Plymale - producer, engineer
- Superchunk - producer
- Mike Stucker - assistant engineer
- Mike Flynn - assistant engineer
