= Jon Wurster =

American drummer and comedy writer (born 1966)

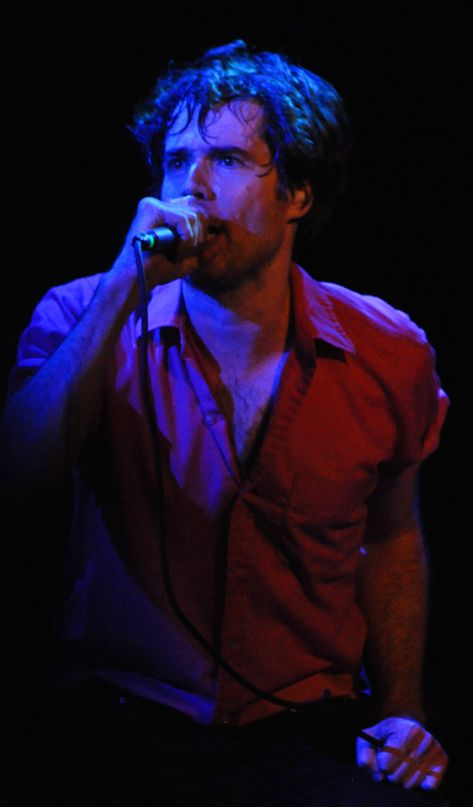
- Jon Wurster performing with Superchunk in 2010

Background information
- Born: Jonathan Patrick Wurster; October 31, 1966 (age 59); Sellersville, Pennsylvania, U.S.
- Genres: Alternative rock; indie rock; indie folk; folk rock
- Occupations: Musician, writer
- Instrument: Drums
- Years active: 1981–present
- Member of: The Mountain Goats
- Formerly of: Superchunk
- Website: www.instagram.com/jonwurster/

Jonathan Patrick Wurster (born October 31, 1966) is an American drummer, percussionist, vocalist and comedy writer. As a musician, he is best known for his work with Superchunk, the Mountain Goats, and Bob Mould. He is also known for appearing on The Best Show with Tom Scharpling.

Wurster has recorded and performed live with Jay Farrar, Ben Gibbard, Robert Pollard, Katy Perry, The New Pornographers, Rocket from the Crypt, Alejandro Escovedo, and R.E.M.

== Music career ==
=== Early music career ===
Wurster grew up in the southeastern Pennsylvania town of Harleysville and began playing drums at the age of ten, taking lessons for a few years before playing in local bands. In 1984 Wurster joined the psychedelic punk band Psychotic Norman. The band shared bills with the Minutemen, Die Kreuzen, and Suicidal Tendencies and recorded a three-song 7" EP before Wurster left in January 1986 to play with rock band the Right Profile.

Months after Wurster's arrival, the Right Profile was signed by Clive Davis to Arista Records. In April, 1987 the band recorded demos in Memphis, Tennessee with Jim Dickinson and Jerry Lee Lewis's guitarist Roland Janes at Sam Phillips's Recording Studio. Soon after this session, co-founding member Stephen J. Dubner left the band to pursue a writing career. Dubner would go on to great success as co-author of the book Freakonomics.

Dickinson and The Right Profile began sessions for their debut album at Ardent Studios in the summer of 1987, but never completed the album. The band continued for four more years, eventually changing their name to the Carneys. A five-day recording session in 1989 produced by drummer Steve Jordan at New York City's The Hit Factory has been cited by Wurster as crucial to his development as a drummer. A cross-country tour to Los Angeles to find a record deal proved unsuccessful, and the Carneys broke up in August 1991. Andy York, the guitarist on the final tour, would go on to play with John Mellencamp. The Right Profile's 1986-87 lineup reformed for a benefit show in August 2018 at the Cat's Cradle in Carrboro, North Carolina.

Wurster replaced drummer Doug Whelchel in the Raleigh-based roots rock band The Accelerators for the recording of their second album Dream Train. However, the band's label, Profile Records, stalled the release of the album for several years, resulting in the band going on hiatus. When Dream Train was finally released in 1991, front man Gerald Duncan and Wurster were the only returning members for a show at The Brewery in Raleigh on October 4, 1991. Although Wurster had already joined Superchunk, he continued playing with the Accelerators for their limited tour in support of Dream Train, but eventually left the band to devote more time to his new band.

Wurster moved to Chapel Hill in March 1991 and joined the band Superchunk in October just before the release of its second album, No Pocky for Kitty. Wurster has drummed on every Superchunk from No Pocky through Wild Loneliness.

After eleven years of recording and touring, Superchunk went on hiatus in 2002. During the hiatus Wurster worked with Caitlin Cary (2002); The Minus 5 (2002); Marah (2003); Chris Stamey (2004), and Robert Pollard of Guided by Voices (2006). In November, 2006 Superchunk played with The Mountain Goats at The Daily Show's tenth anniversary party at Irving Plaza in New York City. In addition to performing a comedy sketch with Samantha Bee of Daily Show, Wurster played three songs with the Mountain Goats. As a result, he was invited to drum on the duo's west coast tour in 2007.

Wurster played drums and percussion on the Mountain Goats' 2007 album Heretic Pride and joined the band after the release of the album. He has drummed on every subsequent Mountain Goats album and contributed guitar to Through This Fire Across From Peter Balkan. As the 2008 Heretic Pride tour was ending, he was contacted by bassist Jason Narducy about replacing Bob Mould's drummer on the west coast leg of Mould's District Line tour. Wurster flew from Washington, D.C. to Los Angeles the day after the Mountain Goats' last show and played his first show with Mould the next night in Solana Beach, California. Wurster has drummed on every Bob Mould album since 2009's Life and Times and became a member of the Bob Mould Band. He has recorded or performed live with Aimee Mann, R.E.M., Dave Grohl, The Pretenders, Nick Cave, Ben Gibbard, Charlie Daniels, Britt Daniel, The Bangles, Katy Perry, Guided By Voices, Ryan Adams, Rocket from the Crypt, Magnapop, The New Pornographers, Margaret Cho, Jay Farrar, Alejandro Escovedo, Split Single, Chris Stamey and Peter Holsapple, and The Connells.

On Feb. 10, 2023, Wurster announced his exit from Superchunk.

== Discography ==
=== Superchunk ===
- On the Mouth (Matador, 1993)
- Foolish (Merge, 1994)
- Here's Where the Strings Come In (Merge, 1995)
- Indoor Living (Merge, 1997)
- Come Pick Me Up (Merge, 1999)
- Here's to Shutting Up (Merge, 2001)
- Majesty Shredding (Merge, 2010)
- I Hate Music (Merge, 2013)
- What a Time to Be Alive (Merge, 2018)
- Wild Loneliness (Merge, 2022)

=== The Mountain Goats ===
- Heretic Pride (4AD, 2008)
- The Life of the World to Come (4AD, 2009)
- All Eternals Deck (Merge, 2011)
- Transcendental Youth (Merge, 2012)
- Beat the Champ (Merge, 2015)
- Goths (Merge, 2017)
- In League with Dragons (Merge, 2019)
- Getting Into Knives (Merge, 2020)
- Dark in Here (Merge, 2021)
- Bleed Out (Merge, 2022)
- Jenny from Thebes (Merge, 2023)
- Through This Fire Across from Peter Balkan (Cadmean Dawn, 2025)

=== Bob Mould ===
- Life and Times (Anti, 2009)
- Live at ATP 2008 (Granary, 2010)
- Silver Age (Merge, 2010)
- Beauty & Ruin (Merge, 2014)
- Patch the Sky (Merge, 2016)
- Sunshine Rock (Merge, 2019)
- Blue Hearts (Merge, 2020)
- Here We Go Crazy (Granary Music/BMG Records, 2025)

=== As session drummer ===
- Dream Train –The Accelerators (Profile, 1991)
- Brain Junk – George Huntley (TVT, 1994)
- Above Ground and Vertical - The Pinetops (Soundproof/Monolyth, 1998)
- Forget Their Manners – River City High (Doghouse, 2001)
- A Man Under the Influence - Alejandro Escovedo (Bloodshot, 2001)
- Sebastapol - Jay Farrar (Artemis, 2001)
- Group Sounds - Rocket from the Crypt (Vagrant, 2001)
- Old School Dropouts - The Connells (Black Park, 2001)
- Double Back - Hazeldine (Glitterhouse, 2001)
- 2002 Holiday Single - R.E.M. (R.E.M./Athens LLC, 2002)
- Terroir Blues - Jay Farrar (Artemis, 2003)
- I'm Stayin' Out - Caitlin Cary (Yep Roc, 2003)
- Travels in the South - Chris Stamey (Yep Roc, 2004)
- 20,000 Streets Beneath the Sky - Marah (Yep Roc, 2004)
- Salamander - Doug Gillard (Pink Frost, 2004)
- Blues and Boogie Shoes - The Keene Brothers (Robert Pollard & Tommy Keene) (Fading Captain, 2004)
- Q People (A Tribute to NRBQ) - Mike Mills (Spirithouse, 2004)
- If You Didn't Laugh, You'd Cry - Marah (Yep Roc, 2005)
- Moon: Robert Pollard Live (Merge, 2006)
- Get Guilty - AC Newman (Matador, 2009)
- Here and Now - Chris Stamey & Peter Holsapple (Bar/None, 2009)
- Bright and Vivid - Kathryn Calder (2011)
- Former Lives - Ben Gibbard (Barsuk, 2012)
- Fragmented World - Split Single (Inside Outside, 2014)
- Metal Frames - Split Single (Inside Outside, 2016)
- Dr Demento Covered in Punk (lead vocals and drums) - Philly Boy Roy (Demented Punk, 2018)

== TV/DVDs ==
- Wurster appeared in a 2002 UPS commercial playing drums with Kyle Gass and Charlie Daniels on a version of Daniels' song "The Devil Went Down to Georgia".
- The Electrifying Conclusion-Guided by Voices drums on I Am a Tree (Plexifilms, 2005)
- Wurster was a member of a drum section backing Katy Perry and Joe Perry on Queen's "We Will Rock You" during the opening of the 2009 MTV Video Awards.
- Wurster is the drummer on "Love Take Me Down to the Street"", a song featured in the 2008 film Role Models with Paul Rudd.
- On See a Little Light: A Celebration of the Music of Bob Mould he plays drums with Bob Mould, Dave Grohl, Britt Daniel, Margeret Cho, Grant Lee Buffalo, and Tad Keubler (Granary, 2012)
- Wurster plays drums on the song "Fat Pussy" in Margaret Cho's 2015 Netflix special PsyCHO.
- Wurster is the drummer in Test Pattern, a band featuring Fred Armisen, Bill Hader and Maya Rudolph, in the 2016 "Final Transmission" episode of the IFC series Documentary Now!
- Wurster has performed with Superchunk, The Mountain Goats, Bob Mould, and on Late Night with David Letterman, Late Night with Conan O'Brien, Late Night with Seth Meyers, The Late Late Show with Craig Ferguson, and The Late Show with Stephen Colbert, and The Colbert Report.

== Comedy and The Best Show ==
Wurster met New Jersey native Tom Scharpling on June 19, 1992 at a My Bloody Valentine/Superchunk/Pavement show in New York City. The two found common comedy and musical ground and became good friends. Over the ensuing years, Wurster and Scharpling kept in touch, coming up with comedy ideas that would eventually find a home on Scharpling's WFMU radio show.

The duo's first performance on Scharpling's WFMU show occurred on November 19, 1997. It featured Wurster calling in as Ronald Thomas Clontle, the misguided, egotistical author of a music reference book titled Rock, Rot & Rule. Listeners believed the call to be a real interview with a real author and called in to argue with Clontle over pronouncements like "Madness invented ska" and "David Bowie rots because he’s made too many changes." The Clontle call was eventually released on CD in 1999 as Rock, Rot & Rule via the duo's Stereolaffs label. Rock, Rot & Rule saw its first vinyl release in 2015 on Flannelgraph Records.

Scharpling & Wurster continued their partnership when Scharpling's The Best Show on WFMU debuted in 2000. During this period Philly Boy Roy, Hippy Johnny, Bryce Prefontaine and other beloved Best Show characters (all voiced by Wurster) were introduced. Scharpling and Wurster released four best of CDs (Chain Fights, Beer Busts and Service with a Grin, New Hope for the Ape-Eared, Hippy Justice and The Art of the Slap) between 2002 and 2007.

In 2012 Wurster appeared in the music video for Aimee Mann's "Labrador", which was directed by Scharpling. The video was a tongue-in-cheek shot-by-shot remake of the 1985 video for Voices Carry by Mann's band 'Til Tuesday, and Wurster stood in for the abusive boyfriend originally played by Cully Holland.

The Best Show left WFMU in December, 2013 and relaunched a year later as The Best Show with Tom Scharpling on thebestshow.net

In May, 2015 Numero Group released the 16-CD, 8-hour The Best of Scharpling & Wurster on the Best Show box set. To promote the compilation, Scharpling & Wurster took their audio act to the stage, starting with four sold-out shows at Brooklyn's Bell House. The duo then embarked on a U.S. tour performing live recreations of their Best Show calls as well as new material. Special guests during this tour included Kim Gordon, Vanessa Bayer, Britt Daniel, Steve Albini, Stephen Malkmus, Ben Gibbard, Chris Stamey and Wilco's John Stirratt and Pat Sansone.

Scharpling & Wurster appeared as couch guests on Late Night with Seth Meyers on May 14, 2015 and recorded their Scharpling & Wurster Live at Third Man Records album two days later in Nashville, Tennessee. Wurster is one of only a handful of artists to appear on Late Night as couch guest, musical guest and as a member of the 8G Band. Wurster has appeared as an expert witness in the Judge John Hodgman podcast episode "A Trial of Two Cities".

== Filmography ==
Year	Title	Role	Notes
2000-2004	Late Night with Conan O'Brien	Various	
2000	2Gether	Writer	
2003	2003 MTV Movie Awards	Writer	
2003	MTV Icon: Metallica	Writer	
2005	MTV2 Relaunch	Writer	
2006	Tom Goes to the Mayor	Writer	4 episodes
2006	Monk	Writer	Episode: "Mr. Monk Paints His Masterpiece"
2007	Tim and Eric Awesome Show, Great Job!	Writer	Episode: "Vacation"
2006-2009	Squidbillies	Skyler, Dakota the Hippie	Voice, episode: "The Tiniest Princess" and "Earth Worst"; also consulting writer and producer (6 episodes)
2013	Your Pretty Face Is Going To Hell	Writer	Episode: "Devil in the Details"
2014	The Newbridge Tourism Board Presents: We're Coming To Get Ya!	Reggie Monroe, Peyton Morrison, Trent L. Strauss, Newbridge Inmate, Man at Podium, Denny Rock, Zachary Brimstead, Roy Ziegler, Barry Dworkin	Television short; also writer
2015	Documentary Now!	Drummer	Episode: "Final Transmission"
2015-2016	Steven Universe	Marty	Voice, 3 episodes
2015-2017	Adventure Time	Bryce, BooBoo Sousa	Voice, 2 episodes
2016	The Simpsons	Barry	Voice, episode: "The Marge-ian Chronicles"
2017	Vice's Party Legends	Himself	Episode: "That's Plant Food"
2018	Deadwax	Radio Caller #2	Episode: "Part Four"
2018	Ant-Man and the Wasp	Burch's SUV Driver	Deleted scene

== Print ==
Wurster has written articles for Rolling Stone, McSweeney's, The Onion and Spin and has been a contributing writer for Modern Drummer since 2003. He has written articles about touring and recording as well as features on other drummers. Wurster has also contributed chapters to the following books:

- The Drummer: 100 Years of Rhythmic Power and Invention (Modern Drummer, 2010)
- Sex: Our Bodies, Our Junk (Penguin, 2010)
- No Encore! Sixty Iconic Musicians on their Weirdest, Wildest, Most Embarrassing Gigs (Simon & Schuster, 2019)

== In popular culture ==
- In 1983 Wurster booked Philadelphia punk band The Dead Milkmen's first ever show (at the Harleysville Senior Adult Activity Center). Wurster was later name checked in "Stuart", a song from the Milkmen's 1988 album Beelzebubba ("You know that Jonny Wurster kid, the kid that delivers papers In the neighborhood? He's a fine kid. Some of the neighbors say he smokes crack, but I don't believe it").
- In the season 3 "Bush is a Pussy" episode of Mr. Show Bob Odenkirk tells his former Siamese twin (played by David Cross) that he is getting reattached, not to him, but to "Jon Wurster in Marketing."
- A reference to Rock, Rot & Rule appears on a blackboard in a scene from the Comedy Central show Strangers with Candy.
