= Clambake (disambiguation) =

A Clambake is a New England dish.

Clambake may also refer to:

- Clambake (film), 1967 film starring Elvis Presley
- Clambake (album), 1967 album by Elvis Presley
- Operation Clambake, xenu.net, Norway-based non-profit organization, launched in 1996

== See also ==
- Crosby Clambake, AT&T Pebble Beach Pro-Am
- Clambake Club of Newport, private club in Middletown, Rhode Island
- The Clambakes Series live albums by Superchunk 2002-2004
