= Pool Party =

A pool party is a party in which guests swim in a swimming pool.

Pool Party may also refer to:

== Music ==
- "Pool Party!", a song by the Aquabats, 2000
- "Pool Party", a song by Julia Jacklin from Don't Let the Kids Win, 2016

== Television ==
- "Pool Party" (Lizzie McGuire), a 2001 episode
- "Pool Party" (Modern Family), a 2019 episode
- "Pool Party" (The Office), a 2012 episode
- "The Pool Party", a 2017 episode of Motherland

== Other uses ==
- Pool Party (video game), a 2007 Wii game

== See also ==
- Pool Parties, a series of free outdoor concerts in Brooklyn, U.S.
- Jordan Poole (born 1999), nicknamed "Poole Party", American basketball player
