= Split Single =

- Origin: Evanston, Illinois, United States
- Genre: Indie rock
- Website: splitsingle.bandcamp.com

Split Single is the American indie rock solo project of Evanston, Illinois-based musician Jason Narducy.

Narducy is a mainstay in the Chicago-area rock community, having played in bands like Verboten, Jason & Alison, Verbow, as well as being the touring bassist for Bob Mould and Superchunk. Narducy started the project in 2011 and has released three albums: 2014's Fragmented World, 2016's Metal Frames, and 2021's Amplificado. In addition, the band released a concert EP, 2015's Live EP.

Split Single's music aims for power-pop melodies, punchy arrangements and wry and affecting lyrics. Spoon's Britt Daniel played bass and Superchunk drummer Jon Wurster are featured on Fragmented World. On sophomore effort Metal Frames, Wurster returned on drums while Wilco's John Stirratt was recruited to play bass.

== Career ==
After not writing any original material for eight years, in 2012 Narducy formed Split Single as an outlet to write 10 new songs to debut opening for Steve Dawson's band Dolly Varden at Schuba's. Three songs from that show, "Never Look Back," "Love Is You," and "My Eyes" would later end up on Split Single's debut, Fragmented World. Later, while recording songs for Bob Mould's 2012 solo effort Silver Age, Narducy played bandmate Jon Wurster his demos and the drummer agreed to help properly record them. Spoon's Britt Daniel, who Narducy played with at a 2011 Bob Mould tribute concert, rounded out the recording personnel.

To promote Fragmented World, Narducy created a fake documentary short video called "The Sexiest Elbows In Rock Music". Several comedians and musicians guested in the clip, including Fred Armisen, Tim Meadows, Jon Wurster, John Stirratt, Margaret Cho, Britt Daniel, Mac MacCaughan, Bob Mould, and Dave Grohl. In 2016, Narducy teamed with The Onion to make two more “Sexiest Elbows In Rock” episodes with guest appearances from Jeff Tweedy, Sharon Van Etten, Todd Barry, Michael Shannon, Frank Black and more.

Of the album, which was released in spring 2014, Spin's Ryan Leas had this to say, "Narducy’s latest material exhibits strands of all sorts crashing together: ’80s college rock, ’90s indie, and various brands of psychedelia mingle freely within the album’s efficient 32 minutes of power-pop." In a review at The A.V. Club, which gave the album an A−, Annie Zaleski wrote, "Fragmented World’s lyrics are also no afterthought: While their themes are common—fresh heartbreak, letting go of past romance, despairing about unrequited love—songs often twist darker (“I laid in your yard last night / But you never looked back, never looked back”)."

Metal Frames, Split Single's 2017 album, was recorded at Chicago's Atlas Studios with engineer Matt Allison. The recording band featured the return of Wurster on drums, new recruit John Stirratt, of Wilco, on bass, and Narducy's longtime friend, recording artist and songwriter Nora O'Connor. Critic Greg Kot of the Chicago Tribune wrote of the second album, “...a first-rate songwriter and band leader.” Elsewhere, Magnet Magazine's Matt Hickey wrote, giving the album an Essential New Music designation, "With ‘Metal Frames,’ Narducy not only avoids the sophomore slump, he enters MVP territory”

Split Single have toured with Cymbals Eat Guitars and Divine Fits and have opened shows for Guided by Voices, Eddie Vedder, Wilco, Bob Mould, The Hold Steady, The New Pornographers, and Superchunk. On April 3, 2017, Split Single made its television debut on Last Call with Carson Daly.

Split Single's third album Amplificado was released June 25, 2021. It again features Wurster on drums and adds Mike Mills of R.E.M. on bass and backing vocals.

== Discography ==
=== Studio albums ===
- Fragmented World (2014)
- Metal Frames (2016)
- Amplificado (2021)

=== Live albums ===
- Live EP (2015)
