= Split single =

Split single may refer to:

- Split single (music), a single that contains two tracks, each one by a different artist
- Split-single engine, a variant on the two-stroke engine with two cylinders sharing a single combustion chamber
- Split Single (band), an indie-rock band from Chicago, Illinois

== See also ==
- "Split Single with Happy Lounge Labelmates", a track on the 1998 album Four Lads Who Shook the Wirral by Half Man Half Biscuit
