= Wild Loneliness =

Studio album by Superchunk
- Released: February 25, 2022
- Genres: Indie rock; alternative rock; punk rock
- Length: 38:30
- Label: Merge

Superchunk chronology
What a Time to Be Alive (2018)	Wild Loneliness (2022)	Misfits & Mistakes: Singles, B-Sides & Strays 2007–2023 (2023)

Wild Loneliness is the twelfth studio album by the American indie rock band Superchunk. It was released on February 25, 2022, by Merge Records. Ahead of the album release, the band put out three singles: "Endless Summer", "This Night", and "On the Floor".

The album was recorded under COVID lockdown in the band's home state of North Carolina. It was mixed by Wally Gagel, who also mixed the band's fifth album, Here's Where the Strings Come In (1995). Guest artists featuring on the record include Sharon Van Etten, Norman Blake and Raymond McGinley of Teenage Fanclub, Mike Mills of R.E.M., Andy Stack of Wye Oak, and Tracyanne Campbell of Camera Obscura.

== Reception ==
Wild Loneliness ratings
Aggregate scores
Source	Rating
AnyDecentMusic?	7.6/10
Metacritic	81/100
Review scores
Source	Rating
AllMusic	4/5 stars
The A.V. Club	B+
Exclaim!	8/10
Kerrang!	4/5
PopMatters	7/10

Wild Loneliness received positive reviews from critics. Writing for Pitchfork, Steve Kandell summarized the album as a “moodier” and “more subdued” work by the band that “get[s] to the heart of some fun topics like fear and ambivalence in the face of environmental and societal ruin”, overall giving it a 7.9 out of 10 rating.

Alex McLevy of The A.V. Club gave the album a B+ and wrote: "So many bands settle into a rut as they mature, but what has always kept Superchunk so invigorating through the years is how the music and lyrics have continued to evolve in ways befitting an indie-rock group whose sound has served as the template for a million imitators", and describing it as "one of the long-running group's most tender albums".

PopMatters critic Kevin Kearney called the album a "a course correction after 2018's uneven What a Time to Be Alive, giving it a 7/10.

== Track listing ==
All tracks are written by Superchunk.

Wild Loneliness track listing
No.	Title	Length
1.	"City of the Dead"	4:25
2.	"Endless Summer"	4:14
3.	"On the Floor"	3:38
4.	"Highly Suspect"	4:38
5.	"Set It Aside"	2:20
6.	"This Night"	4:36
7.	"Wild Loneliness"	3:03
8.	"Refracting"	2:51
9.	"Connection"	4:39
10.	"If You're Not Dark"	4:08
Total length:		38:30

Japanese edition bonus tracks
No.	Title	Length
11.	"Wild Loneliness" (acoustic demo)	2:25
12.	"This Night" (acoustic demo)	4:17
Total length:		45:18

== Personnel ==
- Mac McCaughan – vocals, guitar
- Laura Ballance – bass
- Jim Wilbur – guitar
- Jon Wurster – drums
