= What a Time to Be Alive (Superchunk album) =

Studio album by Superchunk
- Released: February 16, 2018
- Studio: Manifold Recording, Pittsboro, North Carolina; Overdub Lane Recording Studio, Durham, North Carolina
- Genre: Indie rock; punk rock
- Length: 32:15
- Label: Merge

Superchunk chronology
I Hate Music (2013)	What a Time to Be Alive (2018)	Wild Loneliness (2022)

Professional ratings
Aggregate scores
Source	Rating
AnyDecentMusic?	7.4/10
Metacritic	83/100
Review scores
Source	Rating
AllMusic	4.5/5 stars
The A.V. Club	A
Chicago Tribune	3.5/4 stars
Exclaim!	8/10
Mojo	4/5 stars
Pitchfork	8.1/10
Q	3/5 stars
Rolling Stone	4/5 stars
Uncut	8/10
Vice	A

What a Time to Be Alive is the eleventh studio album by the American indie rock band Superchunk. It was released on February 16, 2018 by Merge Records.

== Track listing ==
All tracks are written by Superchunk.

What a Time to Be Alive track listing
No.	Title	Length
1.	"What a Time to Be Alive"	3:45
2.	"Lost My Brain"	1:36
3.	"Break the Glass"	3:09
4.	"Bad Choices"	2:53
5.	"Dead Photographers"	3:17
6.	"Erasure"	3:40
7.	"I Got Cut"	2:48
8.	"Reagan Youth"	2:21
9.	"Cloud of Hate"	1:13
10.	"All for You"	3:26
11.	"Black Thread"	4:07
Total length:		32:15

== Personnel ==
- Mac McCaughan – vocals, guitar, cover art
- Laura Ballance – bass, cover art
- Jim Wilbur – guitar
- Jon Wurster – drums
- Sabrina Ellis – vocals on "Break the Glass"
- Stephin Merritt – vocals on "Erasure"
- Katie Crutchfield – vocals on "Erasure"
- David Bazan – vocals on "Cloud of Hate"
- Skylar Gudasz – vocals on "Black Thread"
- Beau Sorenson – recording
- Matthew Barnhart – mastering
- Lissa Gotwals – photography

== Charts ==
Chart performance for What a Time to Be Alive
Chart (2018)	Peak position
US Billboard 200	182
US Independent Albums (Billboard)	6
US Top Alternative Albums (Billboard)	18
US Top Rock Albums (Billboard)	35
