= Come Pick Me Up =

Studio album by Superchunk
- Released: August 10, 1999
- Recorded: March 1999
- Studio: Electrical Audio, Chicago, Illinois
- Genre: Indie rock; alternative rock
- Length: 43:26
- Label: Merge
- Producer: Jim O'Rourke, Superchunk

Superchunk chronology
Indoor Living (1997)	Come Pick Me Up (1999)	Here's to Shutting Up (2001)

Professional ratings
Review scores
Source	Rating
AllMusic	4/5 stars
Alternative Press	4/5
The Boston Phoenix	3.5/4 stars
The Guardian	3/5 stars
NME	7/10
Pitchfork	7.7/10
Rolling Stone	3.5/5 stars
The Rolling Stone Album Guide	4/5 stars

Come Pick Me Up is the seventh studio album by American indie rock band Superchunk, released in 1999. It is marked by the presence of co-producer Jim O'Rourke, a well-known figure in underground circles. Superchunk drummer Jon Wurster said that O'Rourke was selected because the band wanted someone "coming from a different head-space." O'Rourke helped the band decorate the album with string and horn touches that were not typical of their guitar-based sound. One of the horn players who appeared on the album is another well-known figure in underground circles, Shellac's Bob Weston.

The title of the album is taken from a line in "Hello Hawk," the album's first single.

Bass player Laura Ballance did the cover painting.

== Track listing ==
All tracks written by Superchunk.

No.	Title	Length
1.	"So Convinced"	1:59
2.	"Hello Hawk"	4:03
3.	"Cursed Mirror"	3:04
4.	"1000 Pounds"	3:09
5.	"Good Dreams"	3:01
6.	"Low Branches"	2:08
7.	"Pink Clouds"	3:22
8.	"Smarter Hearts"	4:25
9.	"Honey Bee"	3:40
10.	"June Showers"	3:50
11.	"Pulled Muscle"	3:10
12.	"Tiny Bombs"	4:55
13.	"You Can Always Count On Me (In The Worst Way)"	2:40
Total length:		43:26

2015 reissue digital bonus tracks

No.	Title	Length
1.	"Cursed Mirror" (Acoustic)	3:14
2.	"Pink Clouds" (Acoustic)	3:06
3.	"Low Branches" (Acoustic)	3:47
4.	"Honey Bee" (Demo)	3:19
5.	"Good Dreams" (Demo)	3:33
6.	"Cursed Mirror" (Demo)	2:44
7.	"Smarter Hearts" (Demo)	3:41
8.	"White Noise" (Demo)	4:00
Total length:		27:27

== Personnel ==
Superchunk

- Jon Wurster – vocals, drums, percussion
- Mac McCaughan – vocals, guitar, keyboards
- Jim Wilbur – vocals, guitar
- Laura Ballance – vocals, bass guitar

Additional musicians

- Fred Lonberg-Holm – cello
- Suzanne Roberts – violin
- Ken Vandermark – trombone
- Bob Weston – trumpet
- Jeb Bishop – trombone
- Chad Nelson – hand claps
- Chris Manfrin – hand claps
- Jim O'Rourke – vocals

Production

- Jim O'Rourke – producer, recording, mixing
- Superchunk – producer
- Bob Bochnik – assistant engineer
