= The Clambakes Series Vol. 1 =

Live album by Superchunk
- Released: 2002
- Genre: Indie rock; alternative rock
- Label: Merge
- Producer: Superchunk

Superchunk chronology
| Here's to Shutting Up (2001) | The Clambakes Series Vol. 1 (2002) | The Clambakes Series Vol. 2 (2002) |

The Clambakes Series Volume 1 is an album by Superchunk from a set of live albums known as The Clambakes Series. The first of three limited edition live albums in the series, it was released in 2002. The Clambakes Series Volume 1 (limited to 1,500 copies) is a handful of acoustic live sets recorded in various record stores across the United States in tour support of Superchunk's eighth studio album, Here's to Shutting Up.

The band was accompanied by Annie Hayden from Merge labelmates Spent on the tour, and appears on these tracks. Tracks 1–5 were recorded live at CD Alley in Chapel Hill, North Carolina. Tracks 6 and 7 were recorded live at Crooked Beat in Raleigh, North Carolina. Tracks 8–12 were recorded live at Gate City Noise in Greensboro, North Carolina. Tracks 13–17 were recorded live at various record stores in Seattle, Washington. Track 18 was recorded live at Good Records in Dallas, Texas.

== Track listing ==
1. "Art Class (Song for Yayoi Kusama)"
2. "The Cursed Mirror"
3. "Late-Century Dream"
4. "Low Branches"
5. "Rainy Streets"
6. "Hello Hawk"
7. "Driveway to Driveway"
8. "Florida's on Fire"
9. "Detroit Has a Skyline"
10. "Drool Collection"
11. "Sick to Move"
12. "Throwing Things"
13. "Late-Century Dream"
14. "Florida's on Fire"
15. "Seed Toss"
16. "Art Class"
17. "Rainy Streets"
18. "The Animal Has Left Its Shell"
