= Tossing Seeds (Singles 89–91) =

Compilation album by Superchunk
- Released: April 1, 1992
- Recorded: 1989–1991
- Studios: Duck Kee, Raleigh, North Carolina; CRC, Chicago, Illinois
- Genres: Indie rock; punk rock
- Label: Merge Records

Superchunk chronology
| No Pocky for Kitty (1991) | Tossing Seeds (Singles 89–91) (1992) | On the Mouth (1993) |

Professional ratings
Review scores
| Source | Rating |
|---|---|
| AllMusic | link |
| Rolling Stone | link |

Tossing Seeds (Singles 89–91) is an album by Superchunk compiling a number of their earliest 7" singles and EPs. It was released by Merge Records in 1992.

All tracks on Tossing Seeds were recorded at Duck Kee Studios, except for "Seed Toss", which was recorded at the Chicago Recording Company.

Four of the tracks on this album are covers: "Train from Kansas City", a Shangri-Las song; "Night Creatures", a song originally recorded by The Flys; and "It's So Hard to Fall in Love" and "Brand New Love", which were originally recorded by Sebadoh.

"Slack Motherfucker" was named the 19th best single of the 1990s by Spin magazine. It was later covered by fIREHOSE on the Live Totem Pole EP. A video was created for "Fishing", a song that is regularly played in concert and is considered one of their signature songs, often played as the last song or as an encore.

The cover art is credited to Wendy Moore (1991).

== Track listing ==
1. "What Do I" (1989)
2. "My Noise" (1989)
3. "Train from Kansas City" (1989)
4. "Slack Motherfucker" (1990)
5. "Night Creatures" (1990)
6. "Garlic" (1990)
7. "Fishing" (1991)
8. "Cool" (1991)
9. "The Breadman" (1991)
10. "Cast Iron" (1991)
11. "Seed Toss" (1991)
12. "It's So Hard to Fall in Love" (1991)
13. "Brand New Love" (1991)
