= Superchunk =

American indie rock band

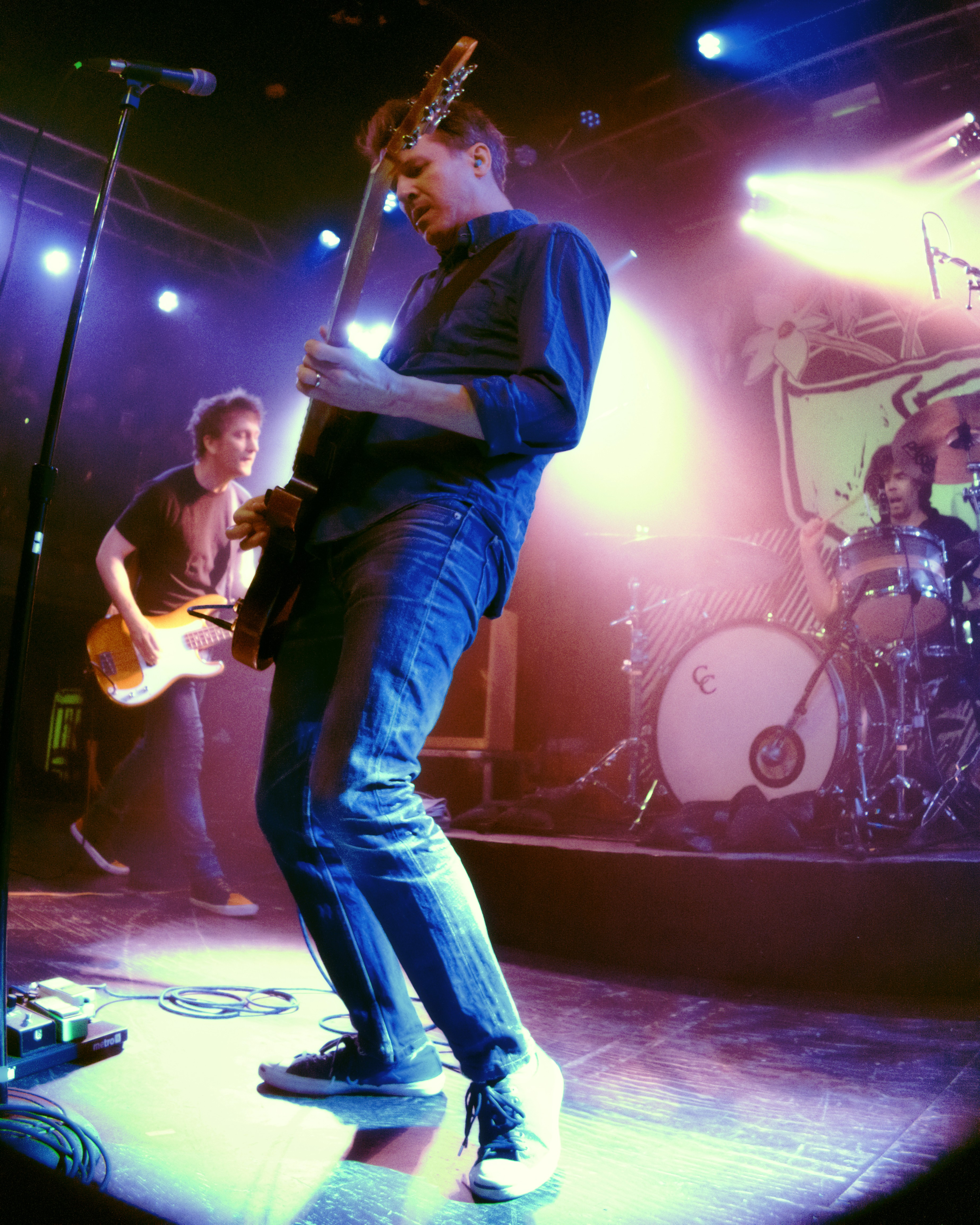
- Superchunk in 2018

Background information
- Origin: Chapel Hill, North Carolina, U.S.
- Genres: Indie rock; punk rock; alternative rock; lo-fi; noise pop; slacker rock
- Works: Discography
- Years active: 1989–present
- Labels: Merge; Matador
- Members: Mac McCaughan; Laura Ballance; Jim Wilbur; Laura King
- Past members: Chuck Garrison; Jack McCook; Jon Wurster
- Website: superchunk.com

Superchunk is an American indie rock band from Chapel Hill, North Carolina. Formed in 1989, they were one of the bands that helped define the Chapel Hill music scene of the 1990s and were at the forefront of the indie rock scene at the time. The band's lineup consists of singer-guitarist Mac McCaughan, guitarist Jim Wilbur, bassist Laura Ballance, and drummer Laura King. They are known for their energetic, high-velocity style and strong DIY ethic.

Members McCaughan and Ballance founded the successful independent record label Merge Records in 1989 as a way to release music from Superchunk and music created by friends, which has since expanded to include artists from around the world and records reaching the top of the Billboard music charts.

Superchunk released a string of full-length albums and compilations throughout the 1990s. However, after releasing their eighth studio album, Here's to Shutting Up, in 2001, the band went into a period of reduced activity. In 2010, the band released their first studio album in nine years, Majesty Shredding, and followed it up in 2013 with their tenth album, I Hate Music. Their eleventh studio album, What a Time to Be Alive, was released on February 16, 2018. Their twelfth full-length album, Wild Loneliness, was released in February 2022. In 2025, Superchunk released their thirteenth studio album, Songs in the Key of Yikes.

== History ==
Superchunk was formed in 1989 in the town of Chapel Hill, North Carolina, by Mac McCaughan (guitar and vocals), Laura Ballance (bass and backing vocals), Chuck Garrison (drums), and Jack McCook (guitar). Initially, the band went by the name Chunk (original drummer Chuck Garrison's name was misspelled as "Chunk" Garrison in the phone book, and the moniker stuck), and they released their first single under the name. After adding the "Super" prefix to their name to avoid confusion with a similarly named jazz band from New York, the first official Superchunk single, "Slack Motherfucker", followed in 1989 on Merge Records. Both releases were well received, and Superchunk released their debut eponymous album in 1990 on Matador Records to more critical acclaim.

McCook decided to leave the group after the release of Superchunk, and Connecticut-born James Wilbur was recruited to take over guitar duties. In spite of the ensuing bidding war that emerged between major record labels in the aftermath of the album's release, Superchunk decided to stay independent, sticking with Matador for their second album, No Pocky for Kitty, which was recorded in Chicago by Steve Albini in 1991. Garrison left the band a few weeks before the record's release, and Jon Wurster was brought on board on drums.

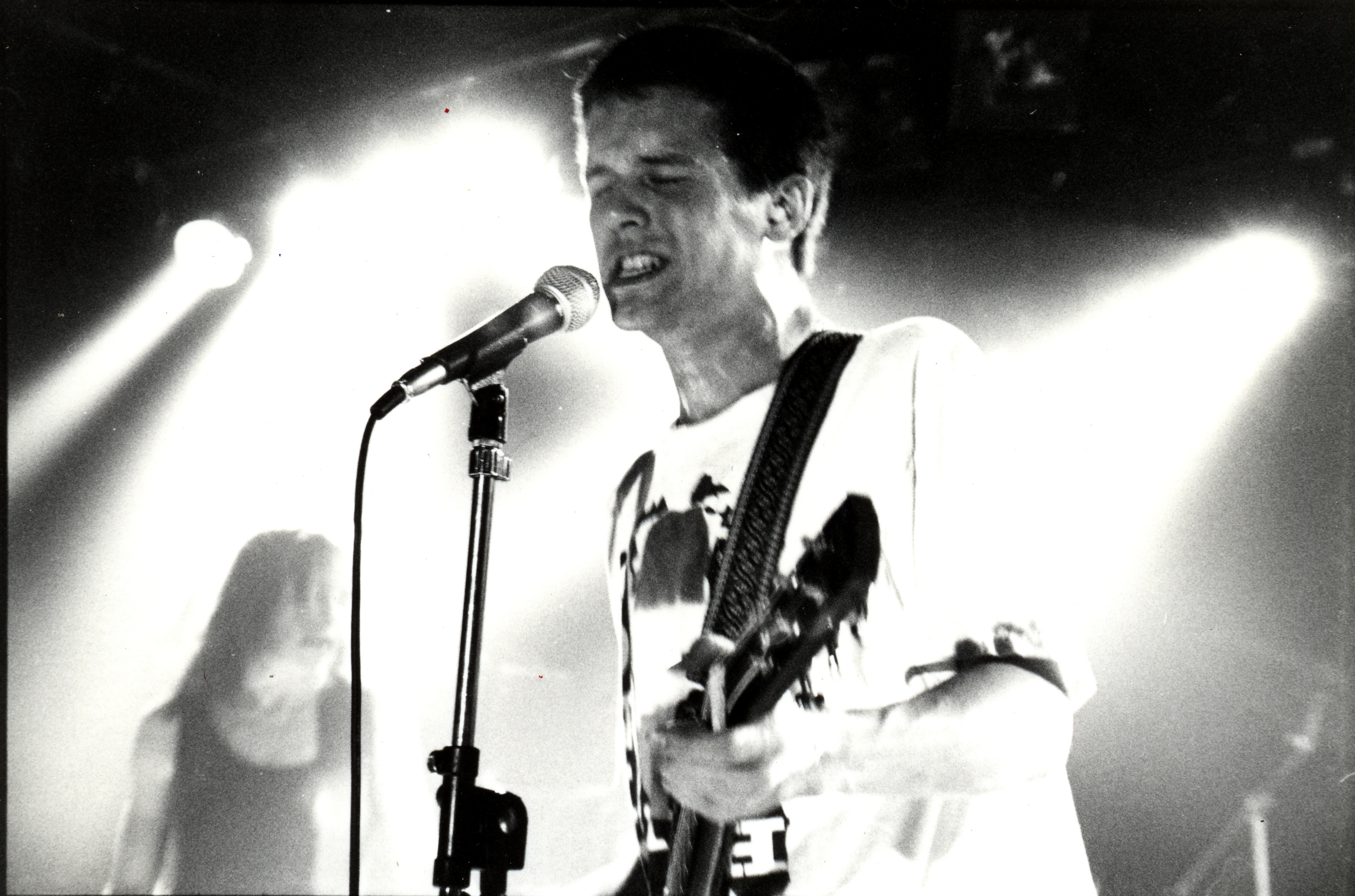
Superchunk performing live in Tokyo, Japan, in 1992

The band put out one more record on Matador, On the Mouth in 1993. After Matador entered into a distribution agreement with major label Atlantic Records, Superchunk decided to leave the label, even though the Atlantic logo did not have to be displayed on their releases. Instead, the band opted to release their following records through Merge. The next album, Foolish, brought further critical acclaim for the band in 1994. A second singles compilation (the first was 1992's Tossing Seeds) released in the summer of 1995. It was titled Incidental Music 1991–95 and contained most of their hard-to-find tracks (imports, B-sides, compilation tracks) released between 1991 and 1995.

Boston was the setting for Superchunk's next album session. 1995's Here's Where the Strings Come In was recorded at the city's Fort Apache Studios and slated for a fall release. The band toured extensively around the world, as well as appearing on the Lollapalooza tour, scoring a minor hit with the "Hyper Enough" single and music video.

After a brief hiatus and another Australian tour, the band released a limited-edition EP titled The Laughter Guns. They then started writing material for what would become Indoor Living. Recording started in Bloomington's Echo Park Studios with Chapel Hillian John Plymale co-producing alongside the band. Superchunk stretched out a bit on Indoor Living, expanding their sound by adding new instruments to the mix, including piano, organ, vibraphones and more. The album was by far their most adventurous, and at the same time, their most accessible to date.

Superchunk delivered their seventh full-length studio release, Come Pick Me Up, in 1999, returning to Chicago to record at Electrical Audio with producer Jim O'Rourke. Superchunk continued the expansion and growth of their sound that started with Foolish, pushing themselves to new heights of creativity.

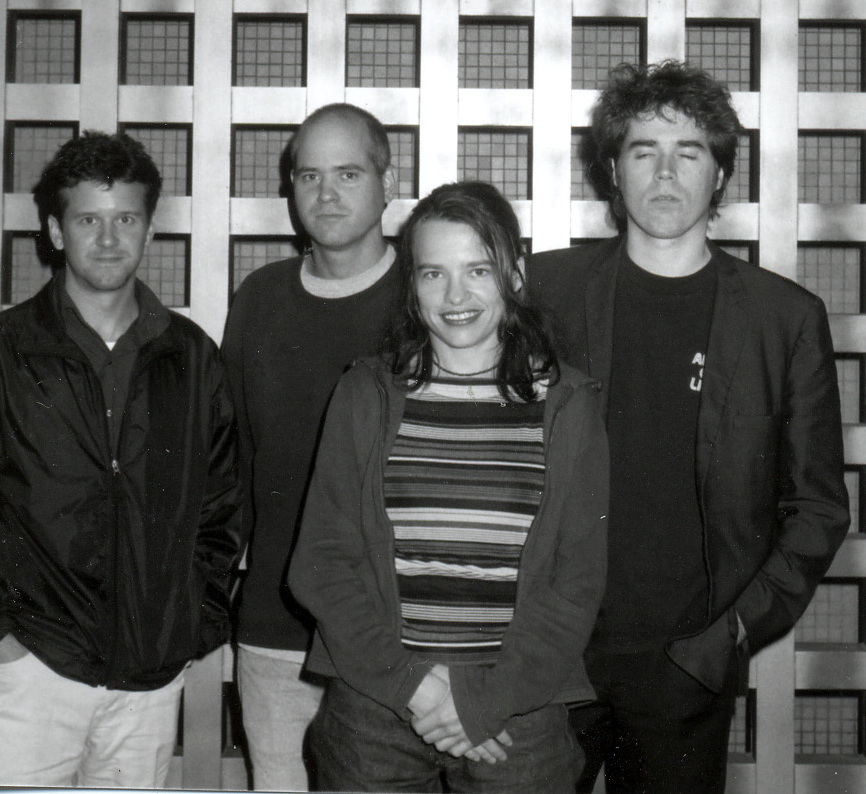
Superchunk on tour in Tokyo, Japan, on October 2, 2001. Photo by Masao Nakagami

In 2001, the band released Here's to Shutting Up. The following year, Superchunk began a series of limited-edition live albums known as The Clambakes Series. The Clambakes Series Vol. 1 (limited to 1500 copies) is an acoustic live set recorded in various record stores across the US in support of Here's to Shutting Up and The Clambakes Series Vol. 2 (limited to 2500 copies) is a film score Superchunk was commissioned to write. It was recorded live at the Castro Theater in San Francisco on April 23, 2002, during the San Francisco International Film Festival at a showing of the 1926 Teinosuke Kinugasa film A Page of Madness.

Cup of Sand, released in 2003, is the third singles album compiling all singles and rare 1995–2002 tracks.

The Clambakes Series Vol. 3 was released in 2004, documenting the live set Superchunk played at Cat's Cradle in Carrboro, North Carolina, on July 23, 1999, for the Merge Records tenth anniversary celebration.

In 2006, Superchunk headlined a concert held in celebration of the tenth anniversary of The Daily Show, a Comedy Central program, at Irving Plaza in New York City. The show also featured a performance from Clem Snide as well as short stand-up comedy sets from various Daily Show correspondents.

In 2007, Superchunk contributed a hidden track to the Aqua Teen Hunger Force soundtrack, "Misfits and Mistakes", with singing from Aqua Teen Hunger Force character Meatwad. On June 5, 2007, Superchunk released the Misfits and Mistakes 7-inch, which has the Superchunk solo version on the A-side, and the Meatwad version on the B-side.

The band played two shows, the Eff Cancer Benefit in Chicago on June 20, 2007, and headlined the inaugural free Pool Parties show at McCarren Park Pool in Brooklyn, New York. They are also known to still play occasional one-off shows at home in North Carolina, usually at Cat's Cradle. Superchunk also recorded a cover version of "Say My Name" by Destiny's Child for Engine Room Recordings' compilation album Guilt by Association, which was released September 4, 2007.

Superchunk appeared at Coachella Valley Music and Arts Festival in Indio, California, on April 18, 2009, alongside other acts including Yeah Yeah Yeahs, The Killers, M.I.A., TV on the Radio, and Band of Horses.

On April 7, 2009, Superchunk released Leaves in the Gutter, their first CD release in seven years. It consisted of three unreleased tracks, in addition to "Misfits and Mistakes" and an acoustic version of the new song "Learned to Surf". On May 28, 2009, the band announced a new 7-inch, "Crossed Wires" b/w "Blinders (Fast Vers.)", which released on July 7 of that year. It was initially limited to a pressing of 1000 on clear vinyl.

On July 27, 2010, the band covered The Cure's In Between Days for A.V. Club Undercover.

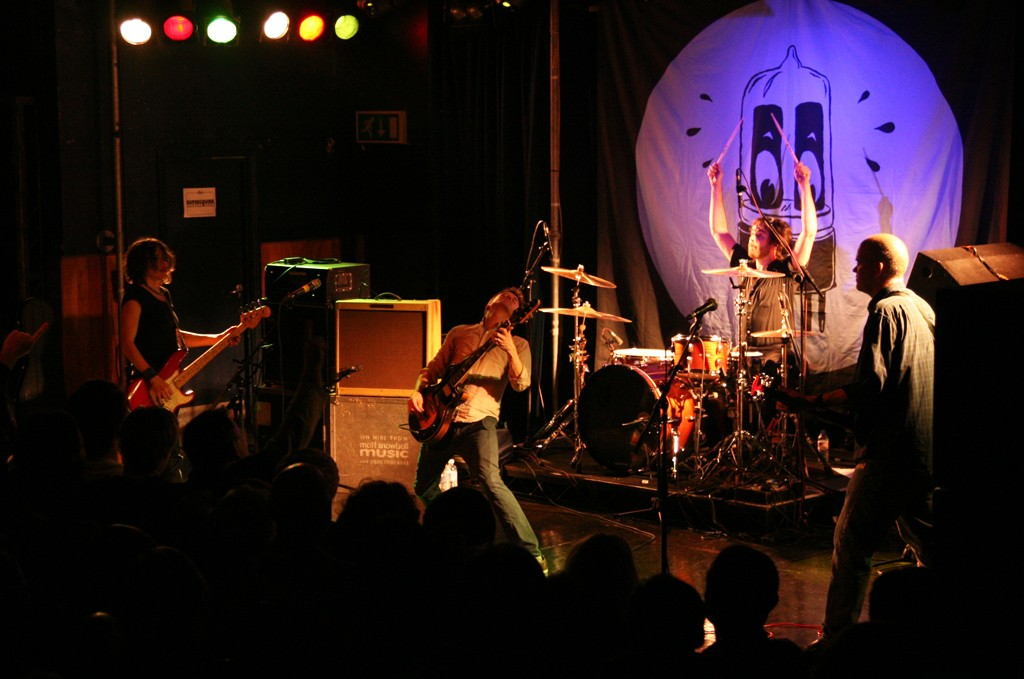
Superchunk performing live in London, England, at Scala in 2011

The band's ninth studio album, Majesty Shredding, was released on September 14, 2010. The band was chosen by Jeff Mangum of Neutral Milk Hotel to perform at the All Tomorrow's Parties festival he curated in December 2011 in Minehead, Somerset.

The band's tenth studio album, I Hate Music, was released on August 20, 2013. Prior to the release, Ballance announced on the band's website that she would not be taking part in the upcoming tour to promote the album, citing a worsening hearing condition known as hyperacusis. Her live replacement was Jason Narducy, formerly of Verbow and then bass player with Bob Mould's band. The band performed in North America, Australia and the UK as part of the tour.

In November 2013, the band played the holiday camp edition of the All Tomorrow's Parties festival in Camber Sands, England.

On February 27, 2016, Superchunk reunited with original drummer Chuck Garrison for a performance of "Slack Motherfucker" at the end of a Scharpling & Wurster live show in Durham, North Carolina. Jon Wurster performed some of the vocals in character as Philly Boy Roy.

In November 2017, the band announced that their eleventh studio album, What a Time to Be Alive, will be released in February 2018.

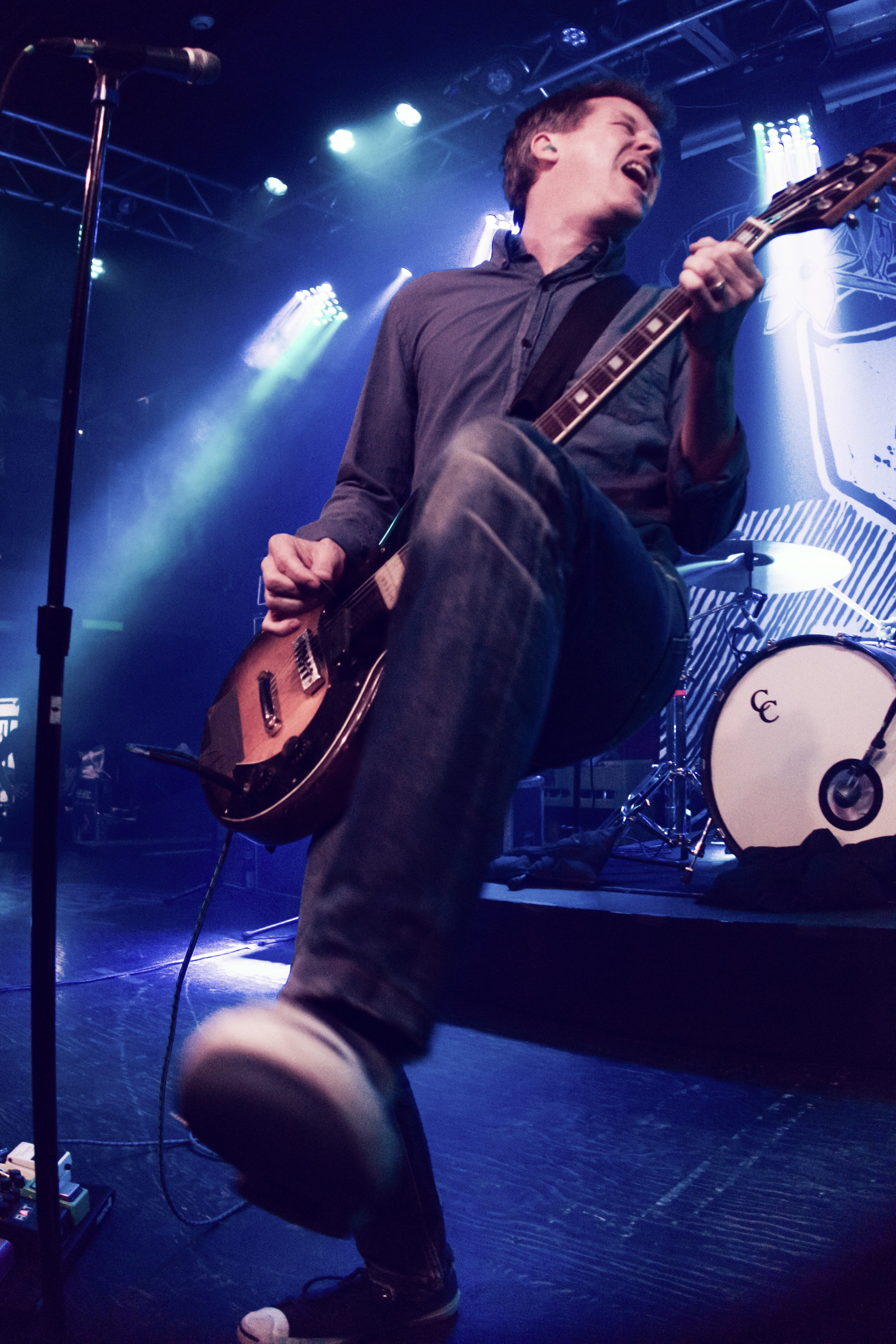
Mac McCaughan, 2018

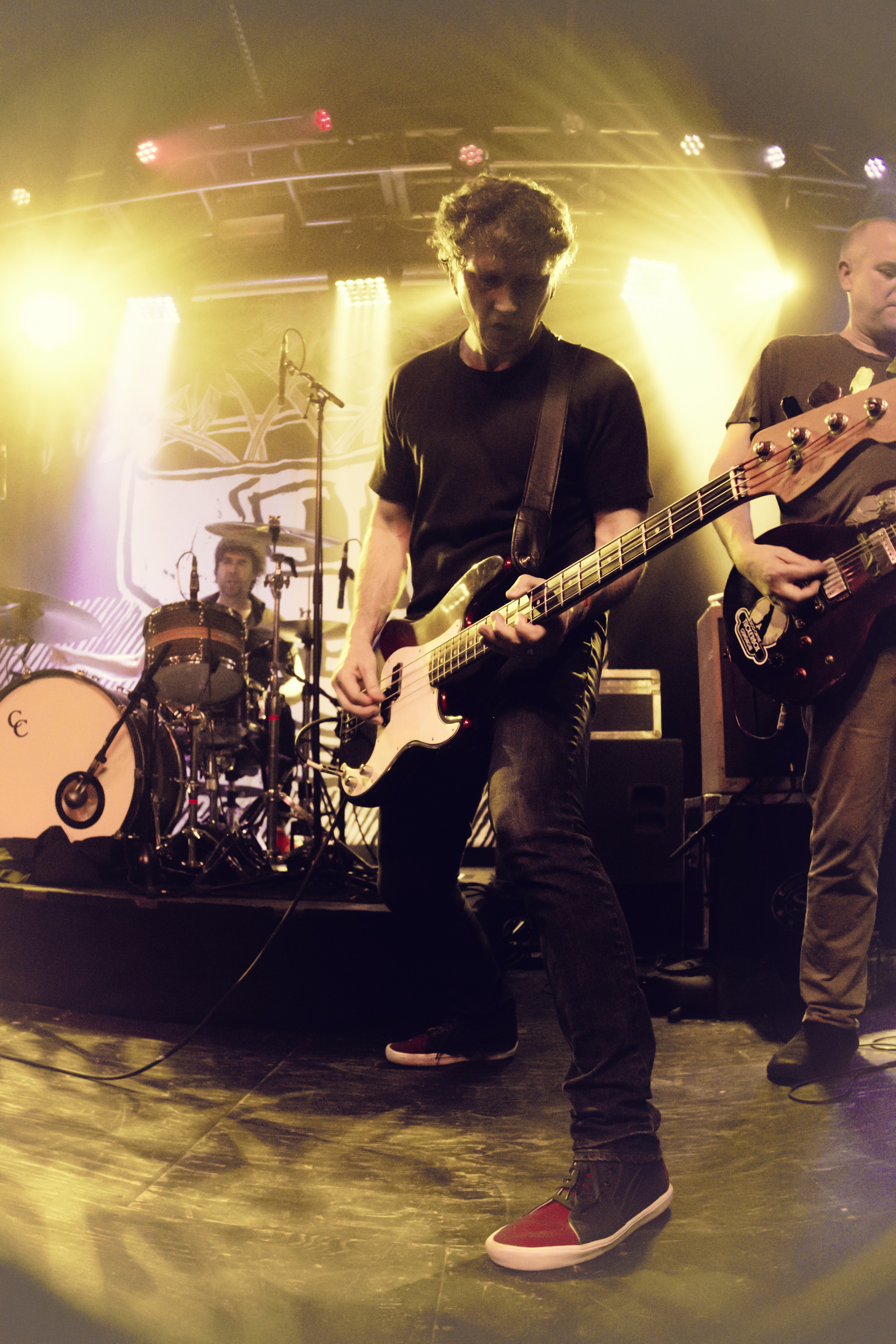
Jason Narducy, 2018

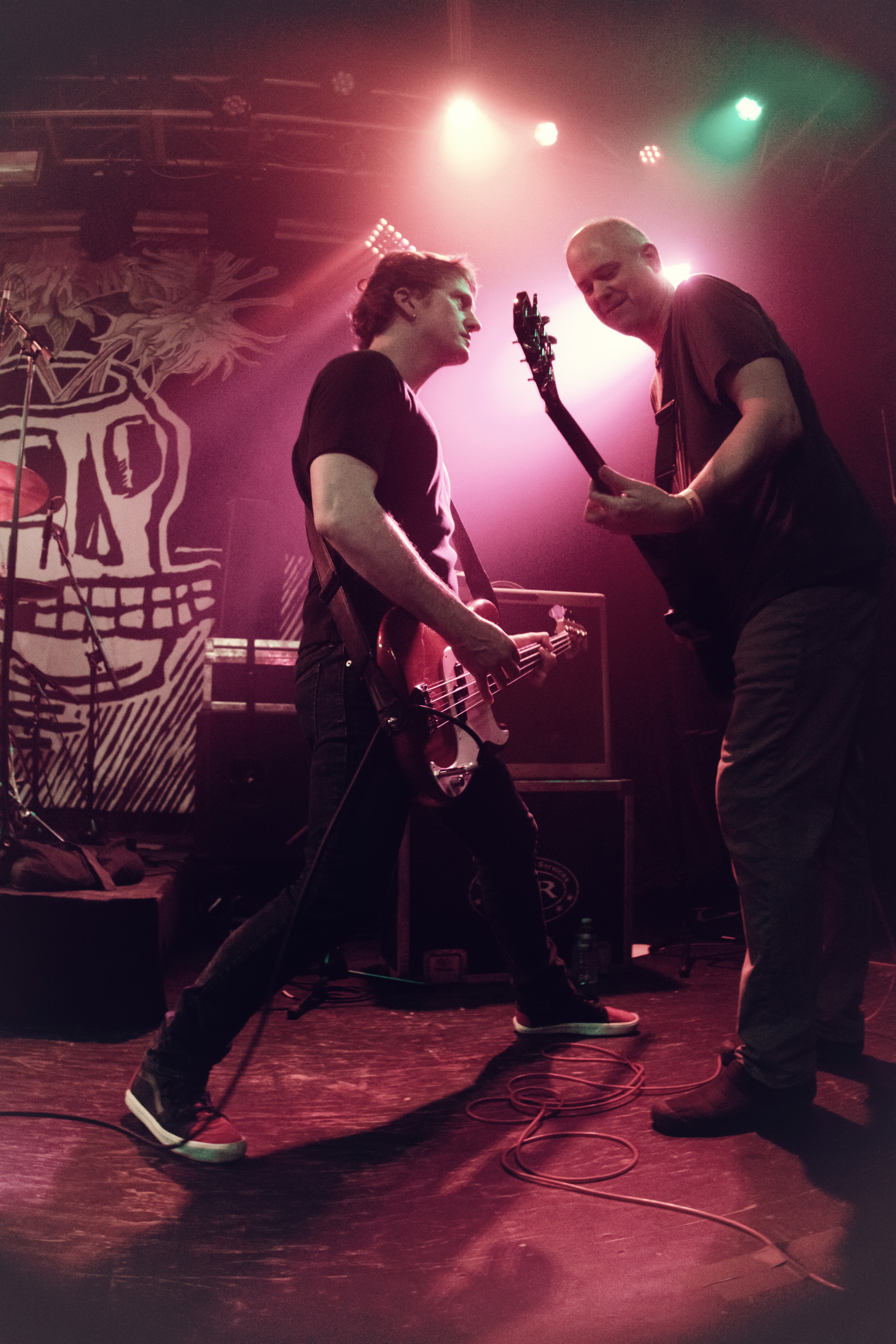
Narducy and Jim Wilbur, 2018

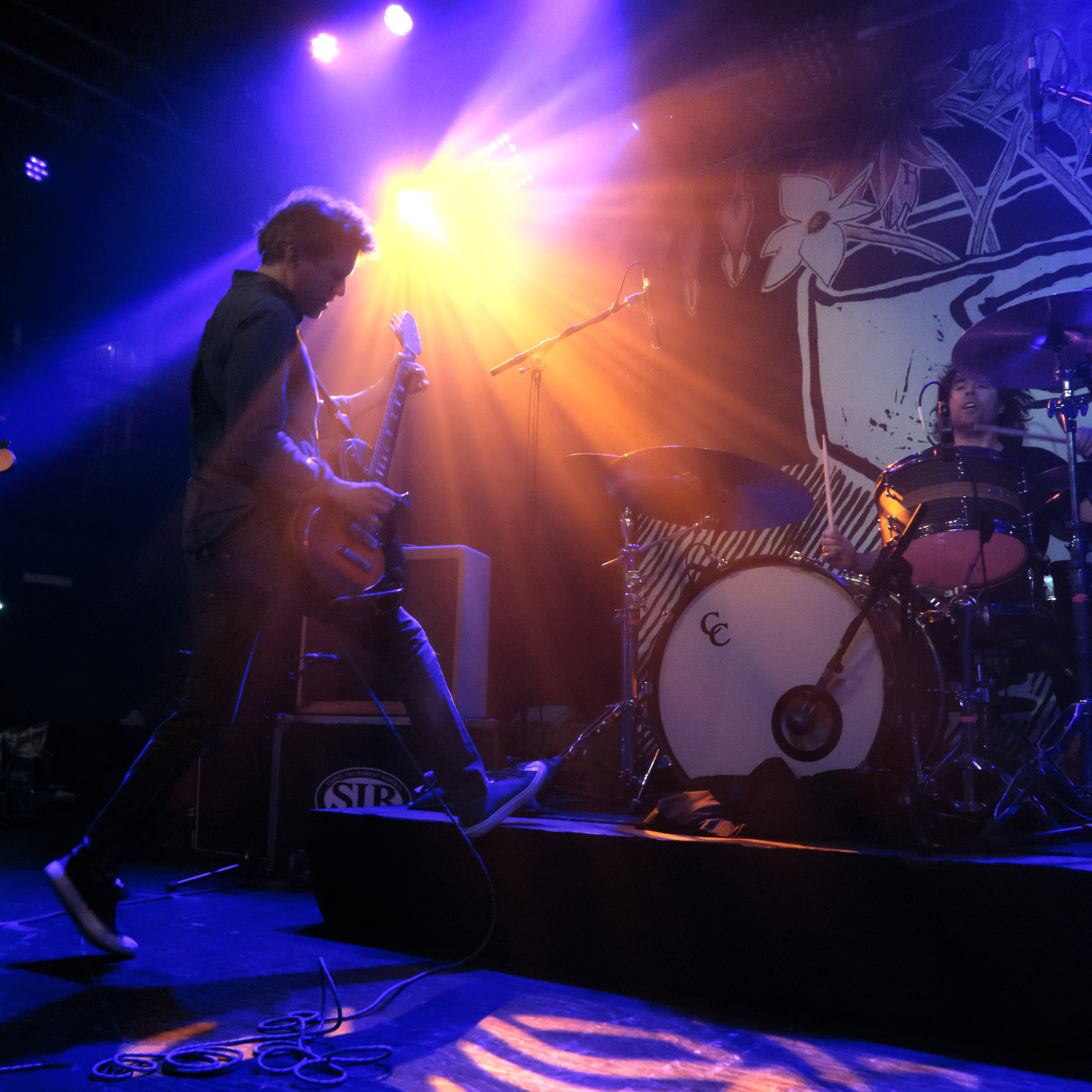
McCaughan and Jon Wurster, 2018

On May 31, 2019, as part of Merge Records' "special 30th anniversary releases", Superchunk released an acoustic version of their 1994 album Foolish, titled Acoustic Foolish.

On February 10, 2023, Jon Wurster announced his exit from the band. In October of that year, the band released the compilation album Misfits & Mistakes: Singles, B-Sides & Strays 2007–2023.

On August 22, 2025, Superchunk released Songs in the Key of Yikes, their thirteenth studio album, on Merge Records.

== Side projects ==
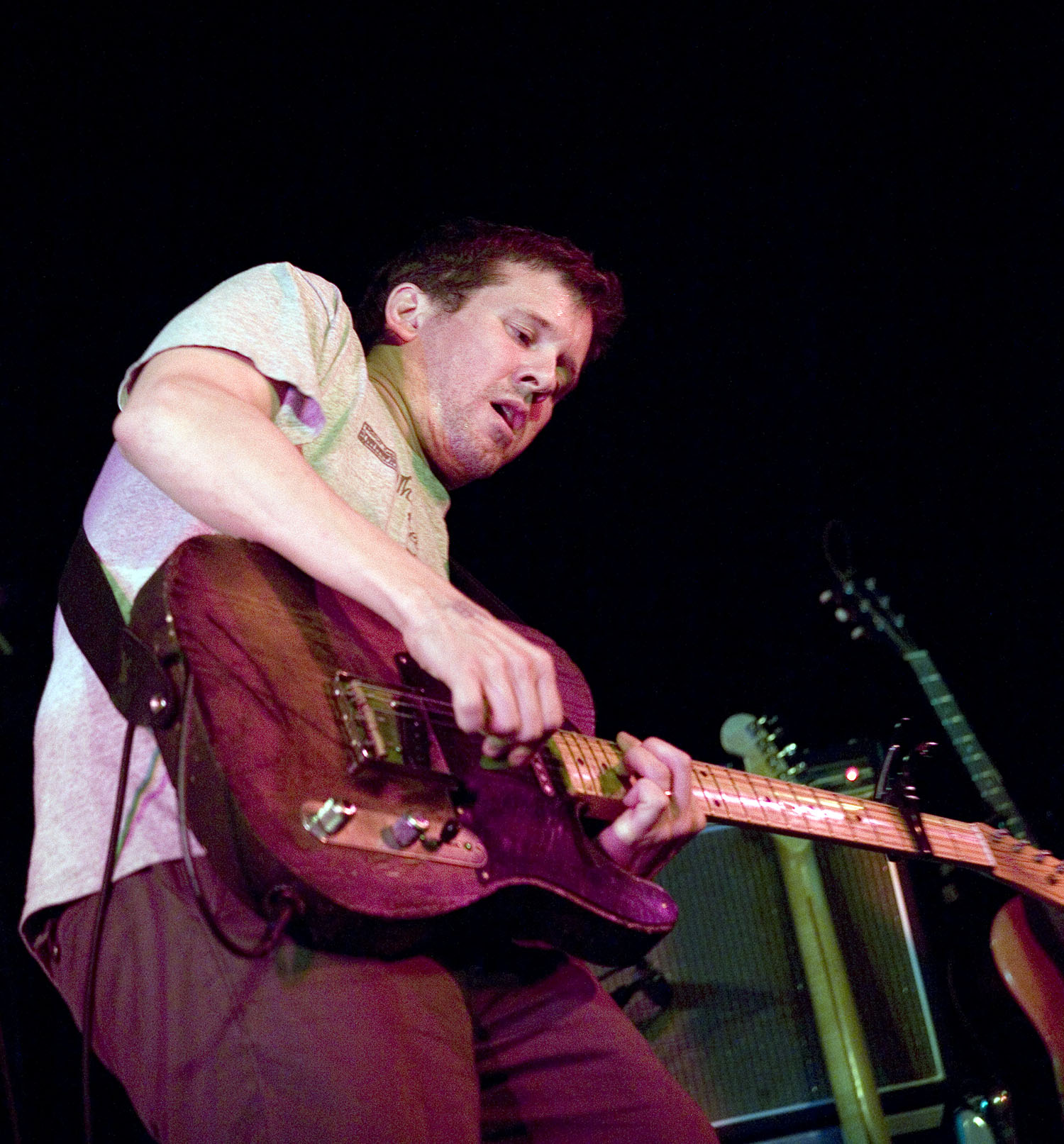
McCaughan performing with Portastatic in Washington, D.C., at Black Cat in 2005

Mac McCaughan has recorded several albums as Portastatic. Initially a solo project, Portastatic has evolved into a full band, which currently includes Superchunk's Jim Wilbur as a member.

Jim Wilbur, a graduate of Fairfield University, in Fairfield, Connecticut, has recorded a number of singles and an album as Humidifier. The album Nothing Changes was released on Link Records in 1996. Humidifier also includes John King from fellow Merge Records band, Spent.

In addition to his work on The Best Show with Tom Scharpling, Jon Wurster joined the group The Mountain Goats in 2007, playing drums on the last leg of their Get Lonely tour. Wurster also began performing and recording on drums with Bob Mould in 2008. He remained a member of Superchunk until 2023.

== Musical style, influences, and legacy ==
Superchunk's music has been described as punk rock and indie rock. The band's early influences included Buzzcocks, Sonic Youth, Dinosaur Jr., and Hüsker Dü. The band would eventually incorporate elements from such bands as Rocket from the Crypt, Drive Like Jehu, and Polvo.

Superchunk has had a significant impact on alternative music, being cited as an influence by Motion City Soundtrack, The Get Up Kids, Jawbreaker, Christie Front Drive, The Jazz June, Lemuria, and The Van Pelt.

Canadian singer-songwriter Bruce Cockburn mentions Superchunk in the lyrics to his song "Last Night Of The World" (1999): "The radio's playing Superchunk and the Friends of Dean Martinez".

== Band members ==
Current members

- Mac McCaughan – lead vocals, lead guitar (1989–present)
- Laura Ballance – bass, backing vocals (1989–present; inactive from touring 2013–present)
- Jim Wilbur – rhythm guitar, backing and occasional lead vocals (1990–present)
- Laura King – drums, backing vocals (2023–present)

Current touring musicians

- Jason Narducy – bass, backing vocals (2013–present; substitute for Laura Ballance)
- Betsy Wright – bass, backing vocals (2023–present; substitute for Jason Narducy)

Former members

- Chuck Garrison – drums (1989–1991)
- Jack McCook – rhythm guitar (1989–1990)
- Jon Wurster – drums, backing vocals (1991–2023)

Timeline

== Discography ==
- Superchunk (1990)
- No Pocky for Kitty (1991)
- On the Mouth (1993)
- Foolish (1994)
- Here's Where the Strings Come In (1995)
- Indoor Living (1997)
- Come Pick Me Up (1999)
- Here's to Shutting Up (2001)
- Majesty Shredding (2010)
- I Hate Music (2013)
- What a Time to Be Alive (2018)
- Wild Loneliness (2022)
- Songs in the Key of Yikes (2025)
