= Misfits & Mistakes: Singles, B-Sides & Strays 2007–2023 =

Compilation album by Superchunk
- Released: October 27, 2023
- Genre: Punk rock; indie rock
- Length: 149:17
- Label: Merge

Superchunk chronology
| Wild Loneliness (2022) | Misfits & Mistakes: Singles, B-Sides & Strays 2007–2023 (2023) | Songs in the Key of Yikes (2025) |

Misfits & Mistakes: Singles, B-Sides & Strays 2007–2023 is a compilation album by American indie rock band Superchunk, released on October 27, 2023, through Merge Records. It contains 50 tracks from the period of the band's return from their semi-hiatus in 2007 to the year of the compilation's release, and is named after their song from the Aqua Teen Hunger Force Colon Movie Film for Theaters soundtrack, "Misfits and Mistakes". The album received acclaim from critics.

== Critical reception ==
Professional ratings
Aggregate scores
| Source | Rating |
|---|---|
| Metacritic | 82/100 |
Review scores
| Source | Rating |
| AllMusic | 4/5 stars |
| Classic Rock | 3/5 stars |
| Mojo | 4/5 stars |
| PopMatters | 8/10 |
| Under the Radar | 8.5/10 stars |

Misfits & Mistakes: Singles, B-Sides & Strays 2007–2023 received a score of 82 out of 100 on review aggregator Metacritic based on five critics' reviews, indicating "universal acclaim". Under the Radar's Michael James Hall wrote that the band "have seen fit here to unlock a treasure trove overflowing with gems, oddities, and curiosities", and that they "remind us so often why they remain one of the greatest guitar bands of a generation with their insanely melodic, rapturously supercharged, endlessly loveable punk rock". Christopher J. Lee of PopMatters called the compilation "a fascinating glimpse of them trying new things while reaffirming their signature contributions to the indie rock canon" but found the "curation of this album somewhat haphazard and the liner notes inconsistent about dates", so advised that it is "best to listen to what's on hand" as it "moves intuitively rather than logically".

Tim Sendra of AllMusic opined that "Superchunk have always strengthened their reputation with music that ranks with the most powerful and important ever made, able to move, inspire, and impress no matter the sound or subject. This collection reinforces that notion, and proves that in their second act, the band remain at the very top of their game". Mojo stated that "while the collection's title acknowledges the scary presence of three Misfits songs[,] as for "Mistakes", however, there really are none". Classic Rock remarked that it is "ultimately a completist's set".

== Track listing ==
Misfits & Mistakes: Singles, B-Sides & Strays 2007–2023 disc one track listing
| No. | Title | Length |
|---|---|---|
| 1. | "Learned to Surf" (EP version) | 3:53 |
| 2. | "Misfits and Mistakes" | 3:37 |
| 3. | "Screw It Up" | 3:58 |
| 4. | "Knock Knock Knock" | 3:41 |
| 5. | "Learned to Surf" (acoustic demo) | 3:46 |
| 6. | "In Between Days" | 2:59 |
| 7. | "Crossed Wires" (single version) | 3:25 |
| 8. | "Blinders" (fast version) | 2:26 |
| 9. | "February Punk" | 2:47 |
| 10. | "Digging for Something" (acoustic demo) | 3:19 |
| 11. | "Horror Business" | 2:34 |
| 12. | "Sunny Brixton" | 2:47 |
| 13. | "Bad Influence" | 0:41 |
| 14. | "Where Eagles Dare" | 1:57 |
| 15. | "This Summer" | 3:17 |
| 16. | "Cruel Summer" | 2:50 |
| 17. | "Void" (single version) | 3:12 |
| 18. | "Faith" | 3:39 |
| 19. | "I Hate History" | 3:08 |
| 20. | "Glue" | 1:20 |
| 21. | "Me & You & Jackie Mittoo" (single version) | 2:01 |
| 22. | "Sunset Arcade" | 3:07 |
| 23. | "White Screen" | 2:40 |
| 24. | "Breaking Down" (acoustic) | 3:33 |
| 25. | "Children in Heat" | 2:03 |
| 26. | "Say My Name" | 3:51 |
| Total length: | | 76:31 |

Misfits & Mistakes: Singles, B-Sides & Strays 2007–2023 disc two track listing
| No. | Title | Writer(s) | Length |
|---|---|---|---|
| 1. | "Good Morning" | | 2:33 |
| 2. | "I Don't Feel Young" | | 2:30 |
| 3. | "Free Money" (featuring Eleanor Friedberger; live) | | 3:44 |
| 4. | "Oh Oh I Love Her So" (featuring Eleanor Friedberger; live) | | 2:00 |
| 5. | "Up Against the Wall" | | 3:32 |
| 6. | "Break the Glass" (single version) | | 3:13 |
| 7. | "Mad World" | | 1:55 |
| 8. | "Child's Christmas in Wales" | | 3:07 |
| 9. | "Break the Glass" (acoustic) | | 3:08 |
| 10. | "What a Time to Be Alive" (acoustic) | | 3:59 |
| 11. | "Erasure" (acoustic) | | 3:37 |
| 12. | "Our Work Is Done" | | 2:59 |
| 13. | "Total Eclipse" | | 3:02 |
| 14. | "Bum My Trip" | | 3:11 |
| 15. | "Can't Stop the World" | | 3:25 |
| 16. | "Political Song for Michael Jackson to Sing" | Minutemen (Note: From the album Double Nickels on the Dime) | 1:32 |
| 17. | "There's a Ghost" | | 2:56 |
| 18. | "Alice" | | 3:14 |
| 19. | "Endless Summer" | | 4:16 |
| 20. | "When I Laugh" | | 2:48 |
| 21. | "Everything Hurts" | | 4:12 |
| 22. | "Making a Break" | | 3:18 |
| 23. | "Group Sex" (featuring Jane Wiedlin) | | 1:08 |
| 24. | "Blinders" | | 3:27 |
| Total length: | | | 72:46 |
