= No Pocky for Kitty =

Studio album by Superchunk
- Released: October 30, 1991
- Recorded: April 21–23, 1991
- Studios: CRC, Chicago, Illinois
- Genre: Punk rock
- Length: 33:37
- Label: Matador
- Producer: Steve Albini

Superchunk chronology
Superchunk (1990)	No Pocky for Kitty (1991)	Tossing Seeds (1991)

No Pocky for Kitty is the second studio album by American indie rock band Superchunk, released in 1991. Pocky is a popular Japanese snack food.

== Production ==
The album was recorded April 21–23, 1991, at the Chicago Recording Company by Steve Albini. It was released on Matador Records in 1991, and reissued by Merge Records in 1999.

Albini is not credited in the liner notes, which read "Produced with eyes closed by Laura, who sat in the right chair." The reference is to Laura Ballance, the group's bassist.

== Critical reception ==
Professional ratings
Review scores
Source	Rating
AllMusic	4.5/5 stars
Chicago Tribune	3/4 stars
The Encyclopedia of Popular Music	2/5 stars
MusicHound Rock: The Essential Album Guide	3.5/5 stars
Record Collector	4/5 stars
The Rolling Stone Album Guide	3/5 stars
Select	4/5
Spin Alternative Record Guide	4/10

Trouser Press praised the album's "indelible hooks" and Mac McCaughan’s "opaque yet curiously coercive lyric expression." Paste wrote that the album "captures Superchunk at the ideal cross-section of youthful ebullience and clearheaded experience."

== Track listing ==
1. "Skip Steps 1 & 3" – 3:07
2. "Seed Toss" – 2:59
3. "Cast Iron" – 3:48
4. "Tower" – 2:47
5. "Punch Me Harder" – 2:13
6. "Sprung a Leak" – 3:01
7. "30 Xtra" – 2:31
8. "Tie a Rope to the Back of the Bus" – 2:54
9. "Press" – 2:08
10. "Sidewalk" – 3:02
11. "Creek" – 1:41
12. "Throwing Things" – 3:26

B-sides include "Fishing", "Cool", "The Breadman", "It's So Hard to Fall in Love", "Brand New Love", and "I Believe in Fate".
