= Songs in the Key of Yikes =

Studio album by Superchunk
- Released: August 22, 2025
- Studio: Sonark
- Genre: Punk rock; indie rock
- Length: 38:17
- Label: Merge

Superchunk chronology
Misfits & Mistakes: Singles, B-Sides & Strays 2007–2023 (2023)	Songs in the Key of Yikes (2025)

Singles from Songs in the Key of Yikes
- 1. "Is It Making You Feel Something?" Released: June 2, 2025

Songs in the Key of Yikes is the thirteenth studio album by American indie rock band Superchunk. It was released on August 22, 2025, via Merge Records in LP, CD and digital formats. It is also the first album to feature Laura King on drums since Jon Wurster's departure from the band in 2023.

== Background ==
The album was preceded by the band's twelfth full-length release, Wild Loneliness of 2022. It consists of ten tracks ranging between three and four minutes each, with a total runtime of approximately thirty-eight minutes. "Is It Making You Feel Something?" was released as the album's lead single on June 2, 2025.

== Reception ==
Professional ratings
Review scores
Source	Rating
AllMusic	4/5 stars
New Noise	4/5 stars
PopMatters	8/10 stars

John Moore of New Noise assigned the album a rating of four stars, stating that "While Songs in the Key of Yikes, maybe not be the obvious answer to the uncertainty gripping the country, it does manage to deliver 40 minutes of joy and respite."

The album received a rating of eight from PopMatters, whose reviewer Brian Stout described it as "a potent collection that could easily be a gateway into the band's formidable discography," and "compelling as a real-time state of the union for the past seven years as anyone has managed."

AllMusic gave it a four-star rating and referred to it as "proof that Superchunk hasn't lost a step and remains a one-of-a-kind band."

== Track listing ==
No.	Title	Length
1.	"Is It Making You Feel Something?"	3:49
2.	"Bruised Lung"	4:24
3.	"No Hope"	3:54
4.	"Care Less"	3:17
5.	"Climb the Walls"	3:50
6.	"Cue"	4:27
7.	"Everybody Dies"	3:03
8.	"Stuck in a Dream"	3:20
9.	"Train on Fire"	3:49
10.	"Some Green"	4:24
Total length:		38:17

== Personnel ==
Credits adapted from the album's liner notes.

=== Superchunk ===
- Laura Ballance – bass, additional shouting on "Everybody Dies"
- Laura King – drums, percussion, backing vocals, additional shouting on "Everybody Dies"
- Jim Wilbur – guitar
- Mac McCaughan – guitar, vocals, additional recording, inner album photography

=== Additional contributors ===
- Paul Voran – recording
- Eli Webb – recording
- Mike Montgomery – mixing
- Steve Wethington – mixing assistance
- Matthew Barnhart – mastering
- Rosali Middleman – additional guitar and vocals on "Bruised Lung", shouting on "Everybody Dies"
- Bella Quinlan – additional vocals on "Cue"
- Holly Thomas – additional vocals on "Cue"
- Betsy Wright – additional vocals on "Care Less"
- Scott Reeder – cover art (Last Call)
- Alex Cox – studio photography

== Charts ==
Chart performance for Songs in the Key of Yikes
Chart (2025)	Peak position
US Top Current Albums (Billboard)	50
