= Pool Parties =

Concert series in Brooklyn, New York, USA

- Genre: Indie rock, punk rock, hip hop, electronica
- Frequency: Weekly during summer
- Locations: Brooklyn, New York, U.S.
- Years active: 5
- Inaugurated: 2006
- Most recent: 2010

Pool Parties /ˌpuːlˈpɑːrtiːs/ was a summer series of free outdoor concerts that took place in an abandoned olympic-size swimming pool in McCarren Park in Greenpoint, Brooklyn from 2006 to 2008 and at the East River State Park in Williamsburg, Brooklyn from 2009 to 2010.

The music festival hosted more than 200,000 people over the summer. The Pool Parties featured a diverse range of artists such as Aesop Rock, Beach House, Black Lips, Blonde Redhead, Cap'n Jazz, Chromeo, Cut Copy, Dan Deacon, Deerhoof, Dirty Projectors, Dr. Dog, Grizzly Bear, The Hold Steady, MGMT, Mission of Burma, Superchunk, Ted Leo and the Pharmacists, The Walkmen, and !!!.

== History ==
=== McCarren Park ===
McCarren Pool is a swimming pool in Greenpoint, Brooklyn, that opened in 1936. In 1984 the pool was closed due to lack of funding and racial tensions. In 2004 choreographer Noémie Lafrance requested permission from the New York City Department of Parks and Recreation to use the derelict pool as a performance space. Lafrance chose the space as she resided nearby and wanted "this space for community use for other performances and for it to be used as an experimental space where people can develop site-specific ideas." Lafrance was able get to permission by raising funds and a donation of $200,000 from Live Nation but controversy arose as Lafrance and community activists objected to Live Nation's plans for paid concerts using the public space for private profit.

=== 2006–2007 ===
In response to the controversy the Parks Department permitted a series of free performances. On July 9, 2006 music promoter JellyNYC got involved through Lafrance and hosted Les Savy Fav for a free concert on a makeshift stage to a crowd of 3,000 people. It soon became considered one of the best music series in New York City for its good sight lines and ability to hold 5,500 people. In addition to the music, drinks, and food the Pool Parties activities included dodgeball, Slip 'N Slides, and hula hooping.

=== 2008 ===
In 2008 the Open Space Alliance for North Brooklyn won a bid to host concerts from the Parks Department and contracted with JellyNYC as they had produced the Pool Parties for two summers. The cost of the 2008 season grew to $750,000 to cover the free shows that was largely covered by corporate sponsorship. After the first summer of their collaboration the Pool Parties had to either end or find a new space as New York City decided to restore the space back to a functional swimming pool which would prevent future summer concerts. The final free show at McCarren was on August 24, 2008, where members of Yo La Tengo symbolically poured five one-gallon jugs of water from the stage into the pool.

=== 2009 ===
For the 2009 season the Pool Parties were moved to East River Park, which at the time was a slab of asphalt and grass along the East River next to luxury condominiums. The move brought many challenges to the Pool Parties. JellyNYC stated that the move meant a doubling of their site fees, along with the loss of revenue from beer sales and increased security demands that made the concerts much harder to produce profitably. The economic climate made it more difficult to get enough corporate sponsorships to keep the concert series free. The Slip 'N Slides were replaced with children's wading pools for safety reasons but were eventually also prohibited as there were no lifeguards on duty. The site was administered by the New York State Office of Parks, Recreation and Historic Preservation that had greater restrictions than the City Parks Department and were hesitant to renew the contract for 2010 until Sen. Chuck Schumer advocated for their continuation. The State Parks Department were concerned about security and safety violations including a partial stage collapse during a Girl Talk set.

=== 2010 ===
In the second season at East River State Park the Open Space Alliance and JellyNYC engaged in a public dispute over $31,000 that threatened to cancel the August 29, 2010 show featuring Delorean and Dominique Young Unique that was resolved by donations from local property owners to the Alliance. The deterioration of the relationship was reported to be because of money, differences of opinion in event management, band choices and weaker attendance after the move. For the final show on August 29 there was a series of special guests including Big Freedia, The Cool Kids, Doug E. Fresh, Andrew W.K., D.M.C., Gucci Mane, and the lead singer from the inaugural concert Tim Harrington.

=== 2011 ===
In 2011, JellyNYC tried a rebranded series of concerts in the spirit of the Pool Parties in various locations including Aviator Sports Complex and East Williamsburg but were unable to obtain the sponsorships or crowds to sustain them.
