= Foolish (album) =

Studio album by Superchunk
- Released: April 19, 1994
- Recorded: November 30 – December 2, 1993
- Studio: Pachyderm, Cannon Falls, Minnesota
- Genre: Indie rock; punk rock
- Length: 50:15
- Label: Merge
- Producer: Brian Paulson

Superchunk chronology
| On the Mouth (1993) | Foolish (1994) | Incidental Music 1991-95 (1995) |

Professional ratings
Review scores
| Source | Rating |
|---|---|
| AllMusic | 4/5 stars |
| The A.V. Club | A− |
| Christgau's Consumer Guide | (neither) |
| Pitchfork | 8.8/10 |
| PopMatters | 9/10 |
| Rolling Stone | 3/5 stars |
| The Rolling Stone Album Guide | 3/5 stars |

Foolish is the fourth studio album by American indie rock band Superchunk. It was recorded from November 30 through December 2, 1993, at Pachyderm Studios, by Brian Paulson and mixed by the band and Paulson at Steve Albini's home studio. The album was released by Merge Records in 1994.

The cover art is credited to the band's bassist, Laura Ballance. Ballance has stated that although the painting has generated much speculation into its deeper meaning, it was simply an "unpracticed" attempt to hark back to an American Music Club album cover. She was the only model available to her, and the dead rabbit was added after she had watched the Michael Moore film Pets or Meat.

Foolish was completed shortly after Ballance and the band's guitarist and lead singer, Mac McCaughan, had broken up. While Ballance rates the album as her third favorite in the band's catalog, she stated that "...touring for Foolish was so hard. Listening to those words every night and feeling so mute. I didn't get to say anything, and here he was saying everything. I would be up there jumping up and down with tears streaming down my face".

This is the second consecutive Superchunk album where the band recorded a song of the same name, but didn't put it on the album. The US vinyl edition of the album included "Foolish" on a bonus 7" single. The song eventually appeared on the band's Incidental Music compilation.

The music video for "Driveway to Driveway" is a takeoff on the classic film The Philadelphia Story. In the video, drummer Jon Wurster plays a rich buffoon and singer Mac McCaughan plays a scrappy, lower-class guy both competing for the affection of Ballance's character. Guitarist Jim Wilbur plays a butler. The four members also portray musicians.

== Track listing ==
1. "Like a Fool" – 4:42
2. "The First Part" – 4:47
3. "Water Wings" – 4:03
4. "Driveway to Driveway" – 4:41
5. "Saving my Ticket" – 3:25
6. "Kicked In" – 4:22
7. "Why Do You Have to Put a Date on Everything" – 4:33
8. "Without Blinking" – 3:10
9. "Keeping Track" – 4:42
10. "Revelations" – 3:38
11. "Stretched Out" – 4:13
12. "In a Stage Whisper" – 3:59
