= Superchunk (album) =

Studio album by Superchunk
- Released: 1990
- Recorded: January 18–19, 1990
- Studios: Duck Kee, Raleigh, North Carolina
- Genres: Indie rock; punk rock
- Length: 32:48
- Label: Matador

Superchunk chronology
Superchunk (1990)	No Pocky for Kitty (1991)

Superchunk is the debut studio album by American indie rock band Superchunk. It was recorded January 18–19, 1990, at Duck Kee Studios in Raleigh, North Carolina, and released on Matador Records in 1990.

On August 25, 2017, Superchunk was re-released on vinyl.

== Critical reception ==
Professional ratings
Review scores
Source	Rating
AllMusic	3.5/5 stars
Chicago Tribune	4/4 stars
Christgau's Consumer Guide	(choice cut)
Pitchfork	8.3/10
The Rolling Stone Album Guide	2.5/5 stars

The New York Times stated that "Superchunk plays heaving guitars, drags friendly pop hooks through a mudbog, and sounds like griping teen-agers when they sing."

"Slack Motherfucker" was named the 19th best single of the 1990s by Spin, and the 81st best song of the 1990s by Pitchfork.

== Track listing ==
1. "Sick to Move" – 3:14
2. "My Noise" – 2:25
3. "Let It Go" – 2:53
4. "Swinging" – 2:11
5. "Slow" – 5:08
6. "Slack Motherfucker" – 2:52
7. "Binding" – 3:03
8. "Down the Hall" – 2:41
9. "Half a Life" – 3:42
10. "Not Tomorrow" – 4:39

B-sides include "What Do I", "Train from Kansas City", "Night Creatures" and "Garlic".
