= John Plymale =

American musician

- Instruments: Vocals, Guitar, Bass, Trombone, Drums

John Plymale is a record producer, recording engineer, and musician from Chapel Hill, North Carolina, USA.

Plymale was a founding member of the band The Pressure Boys in 1981 as well as The Sex Police in 1989. He was bassist for the band Bustello, a band led by Ben Clarke (formerly of Metal Flake Mother) and drummer for the band Kickball, a trio formed with John Gillespie and Mike Garrigan. Plymale has also performed with the "supergroup" Preesh!, along with Robert Sledge (Ben Folds Five) and Brian Dennis (DAG).

From 1995 to 2020 he worked full-time as a recording engineer and record producer based out of Durham, North Carolina's Overdub Lane Recording Studio.

During that time he worked on recording projects with the Meat Puppets, Squirrel Nut Zippers, Eyes Adrift (Krist Novoselic of Nirvana, Curt Kirkwood of Meat Puppets, Bud Gaugh of Sublime), The Connells, Athenaeum, Superchunk, Portastatic, Tift Merritt, Mýa, Kim Richey, Valient Thorr, Nnenna Freelon, Claire Holley, Dillon Fence, Jake Armerding, Alternative Champs, White Widow, Dexter Romweber Duo, Gran Torino, Roman Candle, King Wilkie, Tony Williamson, Danielle Howle, Caitlin Cary, Shandon Sahm, Jump, Little Children, Jason Harrod, Hobex, and The Gravy Boys.

In 2006 Plymale put together a compilation album called Songs For Sixty Five Roses to benefit the Cystic Fibrosis Foundation, after his daughter was diagnosed with cystic fibrosis. The album's name originates from a common mispronunciation of cystic fibrosis by children.

== Discography ==
=== As producer ===
- [John Plymale at AllMusic John Plymale] at Allmusic Guide

=== As musician ===
==== with The Pressure Boys ====
- Jump, Jump, Jump EP (1983, AR3D)
- Rangledoon EP (1984, AR3D)
- Hell Tape CT (1985, AR3D)
- Krandelbanum Monumentus LP (1986, AR3D/Smash)

==== with Sex Police ====
- Medallion LP (1990, Moist/Baited Breath)
- Second String LP (1992, Scuffcakes)
- Science LP (1994, Scuffcakes)

==== with Bustello ====
- Bustello 8-song EP (2010, self-released)
- Bustello 12-song EP (2012, self-released)
