= On the Mouth =

Studio album by Superchunk
- Released: February 10, 1993
- Recorded: September 14–20, 1992
- Studio: West Beach Studios
- Genre: Indie rock; punk rock
- Length: 45:20
- Label: Matador
- Producer: John Reis, Superchunk

Superchunk chronology
Tossing Seeds (1991)	On the Mouth (1993)	Foolish (1994)

Professional ratings
Review scores
Source	Rating
AllMusic	3.5/5 stars
Entertainment Weekly	B−
Record Collector	4/5 stars
Rolling Stone	3/5 stars
The Rolling Stone Album Guide	4/5 stars

On the Mouth is the third studio album by American indie rock band Superchunk. The album was recorded September 14–20, 1992, at West Beach Studios, engineered by Donnell Cameron, and produced by John Reis and Superchunk. It was released by Matador Records in 1993.

On the Mouth marked the debut of drummer Jon Wurster, who replaced Chuck "Chunk" Garrison.

The band also has a song called "On the Mouth," but it is not on this album. It first appeared as b-side for the single version of "Mower".

According to frontman Mac McCaughan, On the Mouth saw Superchunk pulling from different influences without straying too far from their original sound: "In our minds we were incorporating and absorbing things from bands we were touring with like Rocket from the Crypt, Drive Like Jehu, and Polvo but, when you listen to it, it just sounds like a Superchunk record."

== Legacy ==
American alternative rock band Jimmy Eat World covered "Precision Auto" on their 2010 album Invented. Fucked Up and Tom Scharpling, of Scharpling and Wurster fame, covered the song at the Matador at 21 festival in Las Vegas. Post-punk band Les Savy Fav covered it on Score! 20 Years of Merge Records: The Covers!.

== Track listing ==
1. "Precision Auto" – 2:46
2. "From the Curve" – 3:18
3. "For Tension" – 2:59
4. "Mower" – 3:45
5. "Package Thief" – 2:28
6. "Swallow That" – 6:14
7. "I Guess I Remembered It Wrong" – 3:33
8. "New Low" – 3:20
9. "Untied" – 4:12
10. "The Question is How Fast" – 4:06
11. "Trash Heap" – 3:25
12. "Flawless" – 2:33
13. "The Only Piece That You Get" – 2:41
