= Here's to Shutting Up =

Studio album by Superchunk
- Released: September 18, 2001
- Genre: Indie rock; alternative rock
- Length: 43:41
- Label: Merge
- Producer: Brian Paulson, Superchunk

Superchunk chronology
Come Pick Me Up (1999)	Here's to Shutting Up (2001)	The Clambakes Series Vol. 1 (2002)

Professional ratings
Review scores
Source	Rating
AllMusic	3.5/5 stars
Alternative Press	7/10
Blender	4/5 stars
The Boston Phoenix	3/4 stars
Entertainment Weekly	B
Pitchfork	7.9/10
The Rolling Stone Album Guide	3/5 stars

Here's to Shutting Up is the eighth studio album by American indie rock band Superchunk. Brian Paulson, who served as co-producer, previously worked with the band on 1994's Foolish.

The title of the album is taken from the opening of the song "Out on the Wing."

== Track listing ==
1. "Late-Century Dream" – 4:37
2. "Rainy Streets" – 2:07
3. "Phone Sex" – 4:54
4. "Florida's on Fire" – 3:11
5. "Out on the Wing" – 5:51
6. "The Animal Has Left Its Shell" – 3:32
7. "Act Surprised" – 3:59
8. "Art Class (Song for Yayoi Kusama)" – 4:15
9. "What Do You Look Forward To?" – 7:41
10. "Drool Collection" – 3:32
