= I Hate Music (album) =

Studio album by Superchunk
- Released: August 20, 2013
- Genres: Alternative rock; indie rock
- Length: 37:36
- Label: Merge

Superchunk chronology
Majesty Shredding (2010)	I Hate Music (2013)	What a Time to Be Alive (2018)

I Hate Music is the tenth studio album by American indie rock band Superchunk, released on August 20, 2013, on Merge Records.

== Critical reception ==
Professional ratings
Aggregate scores
Source	Rating
AnyDecentMusic?	7.8/10
Metacritic	83/100
Review scores
Source	Rating
AllMusic	4/5 stars
Alternative Press	4/5 stars
The A.V. Club	A−
Chicago Tribune	3.5/4 stars
Mojo	4/5 stars
MSN Music (Expert Witness)	A−
Pitchfork	7.8/10
Rolling Stone	3.5/5 stars
Spin	8/10
Uncut	7/10

I Hate Music garnered generally positive reception from music critics. At Rolling Stone, Will Hermes noted how "The title is bullshit – the kind people spit when dodging pain." Hermes described the album as "rock vets fighting demons with delicious noise and sugar-crusted hooks as darkness falls." At Alternative Press, Jeff Rosenstock alluded to how the album "veers into darker territory than usual", writing that "there is something to be said about a band who have put out 10 records and none of them are bad." In addition, Rosenstock felt that the release contains "anthems with a seemingly endless supply of catchy melodies and air-guitar worthy riffs."

== Track listing ==
All tracks are written by Superchunk.

I Hate Music track listing
No.	Title	Length
1.	"Overflows"	3:25
2.	"Me & You & Jackie Mittoo"	2:00
3.	"Void"	3:10
4.	"Staying Home"	1:15
5.	"Low F"	4:44
6.	"Trees of Barcelona"	3:10
7.	"Breaking Down"	3:25
8.	"Out of the Sun"	3:28
9.	"Your Theme"	3:25
10.	"FOH"	3:27
11.	"What Can We Do"	6:10

== Charts ==
Chart performance for I Hate Music
Chart (2013)	Peak position
US Billboard 200	74
