= Here's Where the Strings Come In =

Studio album by Superchunk
- Released: September 19, 1995
- Recorded: May 25 – June 4, 1995
- Studio: Fort Apache, Roxbury, Boston, Massachusetts
- Genre: Indie rock
- Length: 47:58
- Label: Merge

Superchunk chronology
Incidental Music 1991–95 (1995)	Here's Where the Strings Come In (1995)	Indoor Living (1997)

Professional ratings
Review scores
Source	Rating
AllMusic	3.5/5 stars
NME	7/10
The Rolling Stone Album Guide	3/5 stars
Spin	8/10

Here's Where the Strings Come In is the fifth studio album by American indie rock band Superchunk. It was recorded at Fort Apache Studios from May 25 to June 4, 1995. The album was released by Merge Records on September 19, 1995.

"Green Flowers, Blue Fish" was originally recorded for the 1995 film Johnny Mnemonic. "Hyper Enough" is also featured in the 1996 film Tromeo and Juliet, the video game NCAA Football 06, and the 2008 film Yes Man. The video for "Hyper Enough" depicted the band members seeking help from a therapist.

== Track listing ==
1. "Hyper Enough" – 3:31
2. "Silverleaf and Snowy Tears" – 5:16
3. "Yeah, It's Beautiful Here Too" – 3:45
4. "Iron On" – 3:51
5. "Sunshine State" – 5:00
6. "Detroit Has a Skyline" – 2:50
7. "Eastern Terminal" – 5:54
8. "Animated Airplanes Over Germany" – 4:13
9. "Green Flowers, Blue Fish" – 3:51
10. "Here's Where the Strings Come In" – 3:52
11. "Certain Stars" – 5:54
