= Laura Ballance =

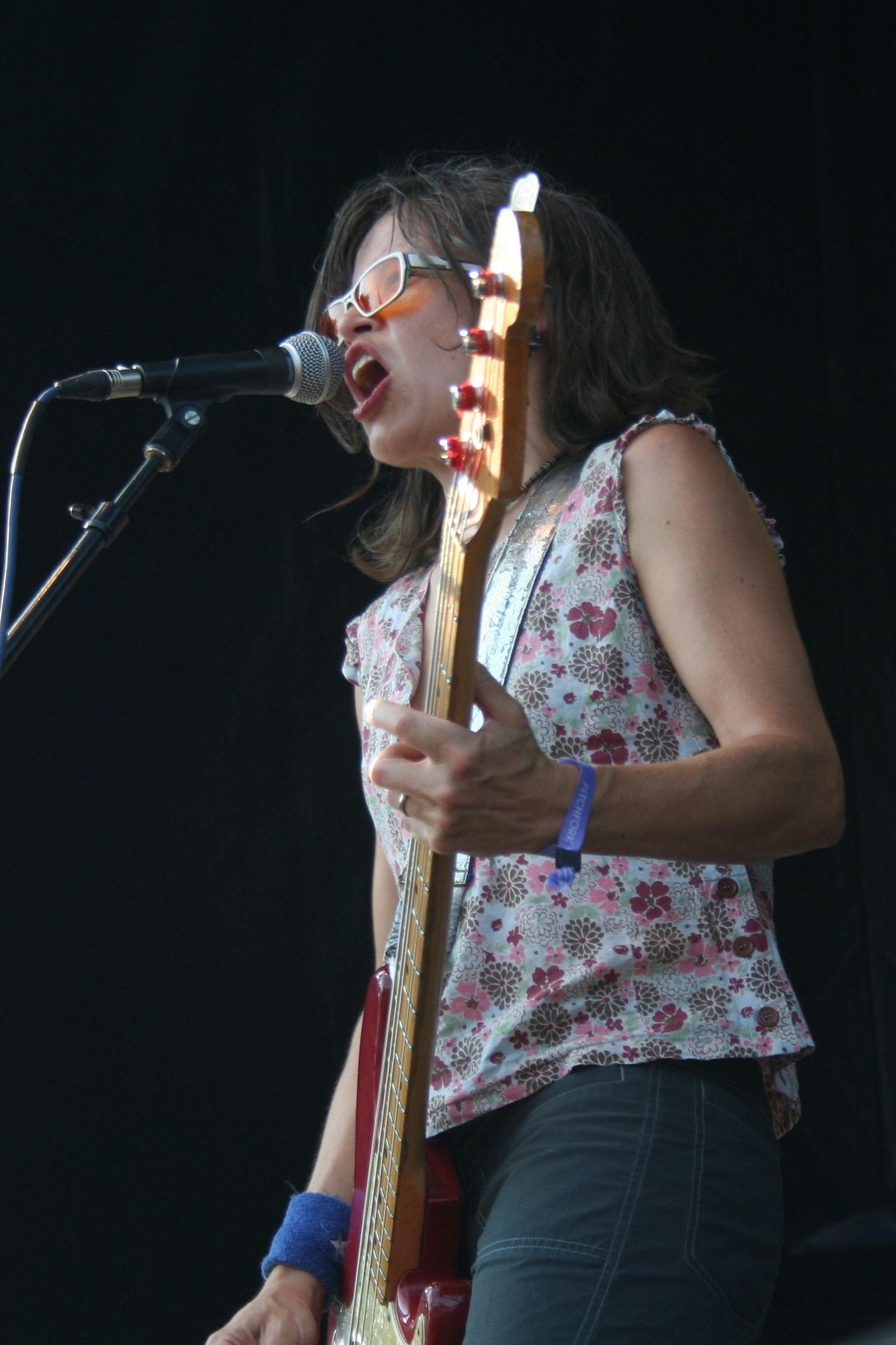

Background information
- Born: Laura Jane Ballance; February 22, 1968 (age 58)
- Origin: North Carolina
- Genres: Alternative rock
- Years active: 1989–present
- Labels: Merge Records (co-founder); Matador Records
- Member of: Superchunk

Laura Jane Ballance (born February 22, 1968) is the bassist in the rock band Superchunk (also contributing occasional backing vocals) and co-founder of Merge Records along with Mac McCaughan. In 2013 she announced that she would no longer be touring with the band due to her worsening hyperacusis.

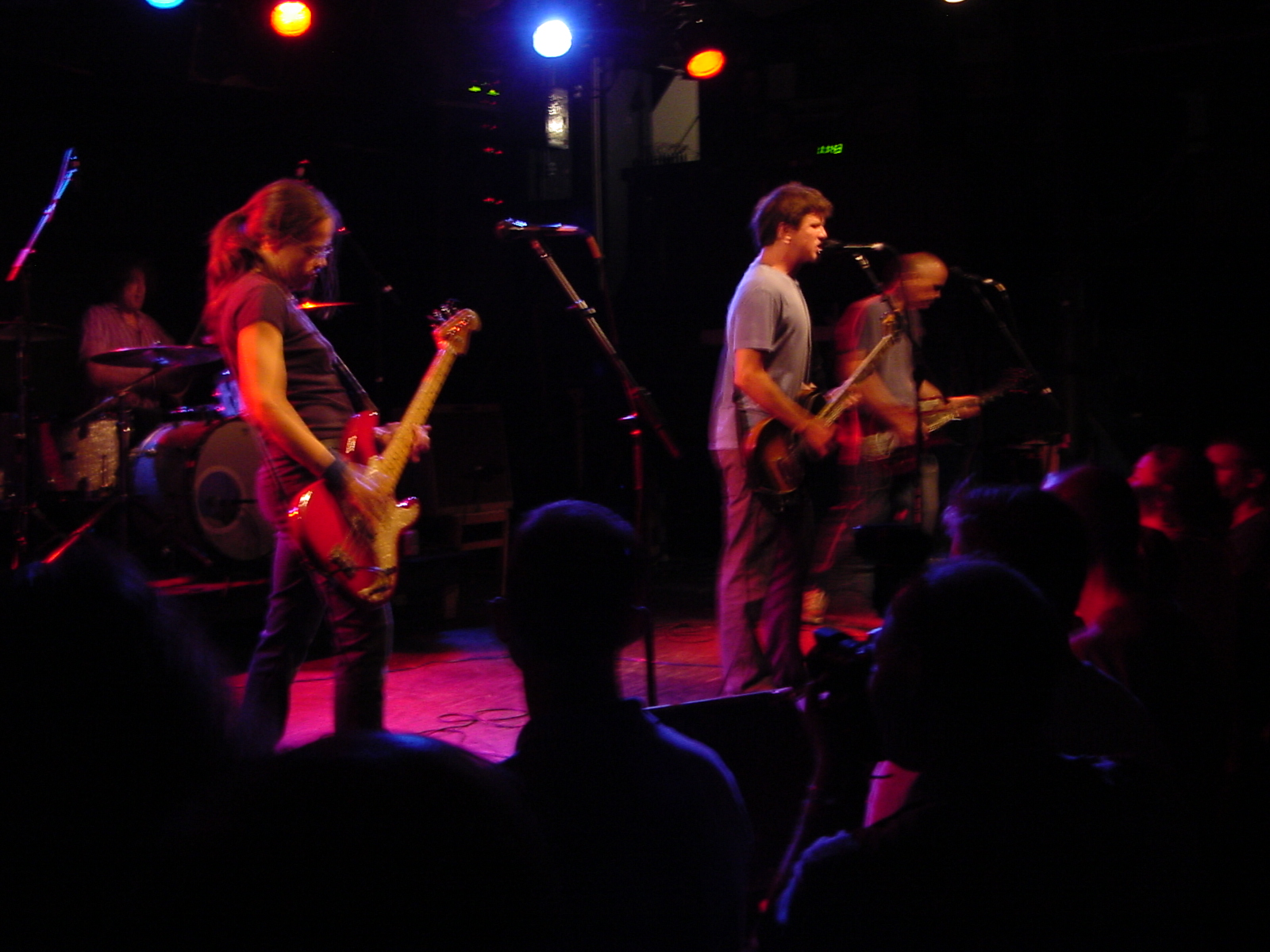
Performing live with Superchunk: Carrboro, North Carolina - 2006

== Musical history ==
Despite her hyperacusis and announcement that she will no longer be touring with the band, she has remained in Superchunk since 1989. Their latest album is Songs in the Key of Yikes, released in August 2025.

=== Merge Records ===
In 1989, Ballance alongside her bandmate Mac McCaughan, founded Merge Records for releases from Superchunk and similar artists. Ballance has also contributed to the book Our Noise: The Story of Merge Records (2009) with Mac McCaughan and John Cook. She left the record label in 2025 after over 35 years of being a co-owner.

== Personal life ==
Ballance has described herself as an introvert as a child, who found punk music as a teenager through a music video by Adam and the Ants. Ballance lives in Durham, North Carolina with her husband, daughter, and dog.
