= The Dirt of Luck =

Studio album by Helium
- Released: April 1995
- Recorded: 1994
- Genre: Indie rock
- Length: 44:17
- Label: Matador
- Producers: Helium; Adam Lasus

Helium chronology
Pirate Prude (1994)	The Dirt of Luck (1995)	Superball E.P. (1995)

The Dirt of Luck is the debut studio album from American indie rock band Helium. It was released in April 1995 on Matador Records and was produced by Adam Lasus.

== Recording ==
The album was partly recorded by Timony and Devlin, before bassist Ash Bowie joined the group.

== Critical reception ==
Professional ratings
Review scores
Source	Rating
AllMusic	4.5/5 stars
Chicago Tribune	3/4 stars
The Encyclopedia of Popular Music	3/5 stars
MusicHound Rock: The Essential Album Guide	4/5 stars
NME	8/10
Orlando Sentinel	4/5 stars
Pitchfork	8.0/10
The Village Voice	(choice cut)

Trouser Press wrote: "Best of all is the opener, 'Pat’s Trick,' a distorted, percussive exercise in sexual obsession made riveting by Timony’s fluttering-yet- powerful delivery." Salon wrote that "the arcing melodies on notable Dirt of Luck songs such as 'Pat's Trick' and 'Honeycomb' contort like a kite twisting in the sky, as Timony's dusky voice and noisy guitar hum add a steadying presence." Rolling Stone called the album an "off-kilter pop opus." Gimme Indie Rock: 500 Essential American Underground Rock Albums 1981-1996 called it "a beacon of progressive noise-pop."

== Track listing ==
No.	Title	Length
1.	"Pat's Trick"	3:20
2.	"Trixie's Star"	2:44
3.	"Silver Angel"	2:54
4.	"Baby's Going Underground"	6:24
5.	"Medusa"	3:10
6.	"Comet #9"	2:09
7.	"Skeleton"	4:11
8.	"Superball"	2:35
9.	"All the X's Have Wings"	3:13
10.	"Oh, the Wind and Rain"	5:29
11.	"Honeycomb"	4:22
12.	"Flower of the Apocalypse"	3:46

== Personnel ==
Helium

- Mary Timony — guitars, vocals; bass (tracks 1, 5, 11), keyboards (tracks 2, 3, 8), drums (track 2), organ (tracks 4, 10), xylophone (track 4), piano (track 6)
- Ash Bowie — bass (tracks 2–4, 7–10), drone guitar (tracks 4, 8), piano (track 4), keyboards (tracks 6, 10), guitars (track 12)
- Shawn King Devlin — drums (tracks 1, 3–5, 7–11), percussion (tracks 2, 5, 11), cymbals (track 6), drum (track 12)

Technical personnel

- Adam Lasus – production, engineering
- Greg Calbi – mastering
- Kendall Meade – artwork
