= Superball+ =

EP by Helium
- Released: September 19, 1995
- Recorded: 1994–1995
- Genre: Indie rock, alternative rock
- Label: Matador Records
- Producer: Helium; Adam Lasus

Helium chronology
The Dirt of Luck (1995)	Superball+ (1995)	No Guitars (1997)

Professional ratings
Review scores
Source	Rating
AllMusic	4/5 stars
The Encyclopedia of Popular Music	3/5 stars

Superball+ is an EP by American indie rock band Helium. It was released on September 19, 1995, on Matador Records.

== Critical reception ==
AllMusic praised the title track, writing that "Mary Timony's insightful, metaphoric lyrics are paired with an offbeat, whimsical melody ... [it's] the best track on the EP." The Austin Chronicle wrote that "What Institution Are You From?" "broods with a hypnotic beat and slinky bassline." Spin included the title track on its list of the 20 best singles of 1995, writing that Timony's "coyly distorted guitar may be indie rock's most intriguing instrument."

== Track listing ==
No.	Title	Length
1.	"Superball"
2.	"What Institution Are You From?"
3.	"Lucky Charm"
4.	"#12 l'Enfant"
5.	"I Am a Witch"

== Personnel ==
- Mary Timony – Organ, Bass, Guitar, Keyboards, Vocals, Xylophone
- Ash Bowie – Bass, Guitar, Keyboards
- Shawn King Devlin – Percussion, Drums
- Adam Lasus – Producer
- Eric Masunaga – Engineer, Mixing
