= Wild Flag (album) =

Studio album by Wild Flag
- Released: September 13, 2011
- Recorded: 2011
- Studio: The Hangar (Sacramento, California); Type Foundry (Portland, Oregon)
- Genre: Rock; pop rock; pop-punk
- Length: 40:04
- Label: Merge
- Producer: Wild Flag

Singles from Wild Flag
- 1. "Future Crimes" Released: April 18, 2011; 2. "Glass Tambourine" Released: April 18, 2011; 3. "Romance" Released: 2011; 4. "Boom" Released: 2011; 5. "Electric Band" Released: 2011

Wild Flag is the only studio album by American indie rock band Wild Flag. It was released on September 13, 2011, on Merge Records in America and Wichita Recordings in England.

== Composition ==
Musically, Wild Flag takes on "endlessly catchy" pop-punk and "determined" pop rock while also showing the quartet's psych-rock side.

It is also seen as a fusion of 1970s punk with "careful" hints of new wave music. Rebecca Cole's keys tap into the latter genre and its "nervy urgency", as well as the proto-punk of the 1972 compilation Nuggets.

== Critical reception ==
Professional ratings
Aggregate scores
Source	Rating
AnyDecentMusic?	8.0/10
Metacritic	83/100
Review scores
Source	Rating
AllMusic	4/5 stars
The A.V. Club	B+
The Daily Telegraph	4/5 stars
Entertainment Weekly	A−
The Guardian	4/5 stars
MSN Music (Expert Witness)	A−
NME	8/10
Pitchfork	8.0/10
Rolling Stone	4/5 stars
Spin	8/10

Wild Flag received a very positive reception from critics, which is reflected by its normalized rating of 83 out of 100 based on 37 reviews aggregated by online review aggregator Metacritic. Pitchfork placed the album at number 49 on its list of the "Top 50 albums of 2011".

== Track listing ==
1. "Romance" – 3:52
2. "Something Came Over Me" – 4:03
3. "Boom" – 2:45
4. "Glass Tambourine" – 5:29
5. "Endless Talk" – 3:00
6. "Short Version" – 3:34
7. "Electric Band" – 3:33
8. "Future Crimes" – 2:44
9. "Racehorse" – 6:40
10. "Black Tiles" – 4:30

iTunes Store bonus track

11. "Oh Yeah" – 2:32

== Personnel ==
- Carrie Brownstein – guitar, vocals
- Rebecca Cole – keyboards, piano, vocals
- Mary Timony – guitar, vocals
- Janet Weiss – drums, vocals
