= The Magic City (Helium album) =

Studio album by Helium
- Released: September 9, 1997
- Recorded: 1997
- Genres: Indie rock, alternative rock, post-punk, noise pop
- Length: 51:40
- Label: Matador Records
- Producers: Mitch Easter; Helium

Helium chronology
No Guitars (1997)	The Magic City (1997)

The Magic City is the second and final studio album from American indie rock band Helium. It was released in 1997 on Matador Records.

== Production ==
The album was produced at Mitch Easter's Fidelitorium studio, in North Carolina. It was recorded in six weeks. Its sound was influenced by psychedelic and progressive rock, notably King Crimson.

== Critical reception ==
AllMusic called the album "a rich, colorful array of sounds ... that blends lo-fi indie-rock with '70s prog rock." Magnet wrote: "The album is a Pet Sounds chamber-pop-meets-progressive-rock indie masterpiece, created long before any lo-fi-loving cretin would ever admit to loving Yes’ Close To The Edge, Genesis’ Nursery Cryme or watching Keith Emerson throw daggers into his eight-foot-high synthesizer." New York Magazine praised Timony's "loopy, pensive guitar lines, deceptively offbeat song structures, and quirky vocal style."

== Track listing ==
No.	Title	Length
1.	"Vibrations"	2:46
2.	"Leon's Space Song"	2:59
3.	"Ocean of Wine"	4:04
4.	"Aging Astronauts"	3:08
5.	"Medieval People"	4:08
6.	"Lady of the Fire"	2:19
7.	"Lullaby of the Moths"	3:09
8.	"Revolution of Hearts, Pt. 1 & 2"	8:01
9.	"Ancient Cryme"	3:55
10.	"Cosmic Rays"	3:58
11.	"Devil's Tear"	2:46
12.	"Clementine"	2:31
13.	"Blue Rain Soda"	1:50
14.	"Walk Away"	5:59

Professional ratings
Review scores
Source	Rating
AllMusic	4.5/5 stars
Chicago Tribune	2/4 stars
The Encyclopedia of Popular Music	4/5 stars
Entertainment Weekly	A−
Pitchfork	8.5/10
Spin	8/10

== Personnel ==
- Mary Timony – guitar, lead vocals, keyboards, Chamberlin
- Mitch Easter – guitar, backing vocals, mandolin, pedal steel guitar, slide guitar, percussion, production, recording
- Ash Bowie – bass, accordion, percussion, additional keyboards; drums (tracks 1, 4, 5, 10), all instruments in "Medieval People"
- Shawn King Devlin – drums (tracks 2, 3, 6–9, 11–14)
- Andrew Emmett – violin (track 7)
- Ken Wilmot – trumpet (track 11)
- Chris Stamey – editing, Pro-Tools
