= This Eclipse =

EP by Polvo
- Released: November 14, 1995
- Recorded: August 21–22, 1995
- Genre: Indie rock, math rock
- Length: 20:50
- Label: Merge

Polvo chronology
Celebrate the New Dark Age (1994)	This Eclipse (1995)	Exploded Drawing (1996)

This Eclipse is a 1995 EP release by indie rock band Polvo. It was recorded and mixed by Brian Paulson in Hillsborough, North Carolina, on August 21–22 that year, mastered by John Golden and released on Merge Records.

== Recording ==
The album was recorded and mixed by Brian Paulson, who would go on to do the same for their 2009 post-reunion album In Prism. Reflecting on the experience, guitarist Ash Bowie said in an interview with Tape Op: "we liked the way it sounded. It wasn't the most well prepared for record we've done, but you could hear everything. It sounded good. We didn't have to negotiate about how loud everyone's parts should be — it's all there, just right, nothing else to say."

== Reception ==
Professional ratings
Review scores
Source	Rating
AllMusic	3/5 stars
The Great Alternative & Indie Discography	5/10

David Sprague of Trouser Press wrote that the album "reclaims form [in comparison to their previous release] to a large degree, but benefits from the clearest production — by Brian Paulson — Polvo has ever received. The separation afforded the guitarists' never-twining parts lends some logic to 'Batradar' and 'Titanup', but it's hard not to ruminate about what the band might be capable of if someone made them walk a straight line just once."

== Track listing ==
1. "Bat Radar" - 4:13
2. "Bombs That Fall from Your Eyes" - 5:28
3. "Titan Up" - 3:14
4. "Production Values" - 1:28
5. "Title Track" - 6:25

== Personnel ==
- John Golden - Mastering
- Brian Paulson - Engineer, Mixing
- Polvo - Primary Artist
