= No Guitars =

EP by Helium
- Released: April 8, 1997
- Recorded: November 1996
- Genre: Indie rock, alternative rock, noise pop
- Label: Matador Records
- Producer: Mitch Easter and Helium

Helium chronology
Superball E.P. (1995)	No Guitars (1997)	The Magic City (1997)

Professional ratings
Review scores
Source	Rating
Allmusic	4/5 stars
Pitchfork Media	(8.5/10)

No Guitars is an EP by the alternative rock band Helium. It was released in April 1997 on Matador Records.

== Track listing ==
No.	Title	Length
1.	"Silver Strings"	3:56
2.	"Dragon #2"	3:13
3.	"The King of Electric Guitars"	1:36
4.	"Sunday"	2:27
5.	"13 Bees"	1:25
6.	"Riddle of the Chamberlin"	6:56

== Personnel ==
- Mary Timony - guitars, vocals
- Ash Bowie - bass
- Shawn King Devlin - drums
- Mitch Easter - producer, engineer; slide guitar on "Silver Strings"
