= Shapes (album) =

Studio album by Polvo
- Released: September 23, 1997
- Genres: Indie rock, experimental rock
- Length: 50:08
- Label: Touch and Go
- Producer: Bob Weston

Polvo chronology
Exploded Drawing (1996)	Shapes (1997)	In Prism (2009)

Shapes is Polvo's fourth studio album and the last album released prior to breaking up shortly after its release. It was recorded by Bob Weston and released on Touch and Go Records in 1997.

== Reception ==
Professional ratings
Review scores
Source	Rating
AllMusic	4/5 stars
The Great Alternative & Indie Discography	5/10
NME	4/10
Pitchfork	6.2/10

Tom Schulte of AllMusic called it "a fascinating record that takes great liberties with rock-n-roll", noting its combination of "fuzzed-out blasts ala Blue Cheer with quasi-psychedelic twanging and droning." He ends his review by "predicting" as "a safe bet" that the band "will be looked on as one of the better bands of the 90s". The A.V. Club compared the album to a "3-D relief map, with straight organic rock at its high points and structured geometric sound at the lows", calling it "the sort of journey that meanders through these elements in a way that deserves more attention than your average "post-rock" album". The review ends by writing that "Polvo's genius shows through by achieving the difficult harmony between the structured and the chaotic." Pearson Greer of Opus called the band polarizing, writing that there's "tons of odd time signatures, skronky guitar and bass tones, synth squiggles, solos, and other esoterica that’s straight from prog rock" on the album. He notes, however, that the band "do such traditionally no-smiles allowed, experimental things [...] with a real sense of humor." Adam Selzer's review for Tape Op echoed the sentiment of the aforementioned one, writing that the album "may not sit well with most Polvo fans." He writes that despite being occasionally "boring", certain moments on the album "will make you realize how creative this band really is" and praises Bob Weston's "exceptional" recording, noting the many "overdubs which [make] it sound more like a studio record" in comparison to past releases. He also highlights the album's "influences from traditional Indian and Arabic music and acid rock."

== Legacy ==
Critics and Polvo fans had a pretty strong reaction to that record. I think some of the criticisms of it are valid. It was the only record we could have made at the time. We don’t try to do X, Y and Z. We write and then we play it. There were definitely factors that kept us from spending as much time together as we did before. By that time, we had different drummers. I didn’t have a problem with that, but that kind of feeds into the record. We knew we were breaking up, so there’s some melancholy in it.

— Dave Brylawski

Unlike the albums that preceded it, contemporary opinions on Shapes is mixed. Dusted calls it "the weak spot in [the band's] catalog". "The classic rock muscle proffered on that stalled effort" according to the review, "spelled out the message of a band that had gotten tired of eardrum-bending progressive guitar sounds, infatuated with cultural tourism but grounded in a stoner jock mysticism preoccupied with loafing around the spice market." It called the album "a record of jokes" that "[stacked] every AOR rock move they knew into a few songs that sounded more like pisstakes on that sort of music than the real thing." The Line of Best Fit calls the album "a disappointment, angular riffs drifting into proggy excursions". Pitchfork called it "a hodgepodge of contorted classic rock riffage and fractured-folk interludes that, in hindsight, anticipated the current vogue for Arthur-endorsed new-school psychedelia, but at the time felt like a directionless drift into the unknown".

Under the Radar, however, called it "a maddeningly ambitious record distantly removed from the avant-garde dissonance of their early discography." Delusions of Adequacy called it "a mirage of an album that sounded austere and severe, more deeply embracing some of the Eastern-isms that had always colored their work, and flirting with more classic rock jamming than anyone could have expected", that was "another great Polvo album" though "you could hear the band becoming less interested in being Polvo and more interested in following their own respective muses." Soundblab gave the album a very positive retrospective review, writing that the album is "so open-ended, it has no shape." (in reference to its title)

== Track listing ==
1. "Enemy Insects" - 6:14
2. "The Fighting Kites" - 1:31
3. "Rock Post Rock" - 4:11
4. "The Golden Ladder" - 3:04
5. "Downtown Dedication" - 3:39
6. "Pulchritude" - 1:46
7. "Twenty White Tents" - 5:14
8. "Everything in Flames!" - 3:28
9. "D.D. (S.R.)" - 4:54
10. "El Rocío" - 12:41
11. "Lantern" - 3:23

== Personnel ==
- Brian Walsby - Drums (tracks: 3, 7 to 10)
- DG - Mastering [Vinyl]
- Polvo - Performer ["Sounds And Shapes"]
- Ian Williams - Photography
- Bob Weston - Recording
