= Mountains (Mary Timony album) =

Studio album by Mary Timony
- Released: 2000
- Genre: Indie rock
- Label: Matador

Mary Timony chronology
Mountains (2000)	The Golden Dove (2002)

Mountains is the debut solo album by the American indie rock musician Mary Timony, released in 2000.

== Production ==
Timony played all of the instruments on the album, aside from the drums. Mountains was recorded in Boston and mixed in Chicago. It was Timony's intention to make a more acoustic album, after the dissolution of Helium.

== Critical reception ==
Professional ratings
Review scores
Source	Rating
AllMusic	4/5 stars
Entertainment Weekly	B
Pitchfork	4.7/10
The Tampa Tribune	2.5/4 stars
The Times	7/10

Entertainment Weekly thought that Timony's "unerring instincts—a well-placed guitar strum here, an off-key phrase there—make this determinedly lo-fi effort an easy climb." The Washington Post called the album "a well-realized, cleverly updated example of the rock-and-runes genre." The Times instructed: "Imagine a stripped-back, very simplistic musical cross between the sword'n'sorcery imagery of early Black Sabbath and the baroque, layered vocal pop of Miranda Sex Garden."

The Chicago Tribune determined that "Timony makes disturbingly beautiful music for lapsed Gentle Giant fans and anti-Lilith singer-songwriters alike." The Tampa Tribune stated that Timony "retains the complex song structures and kooky Tolkien-esque medieval imagery but seriously narrows her sonic palette." Jim DeRogatis, of the Chicago Sun-Times, included the album on his 2000 top 10 list.

AllMusic wrote that "these songs are filled with enough death, poison, fire, insanity, and demons for any prog or metal epic, but it's their insular mood that makes them so haunting, especially when compared to Helium's fiery manifestos."

== Track listing ==
1. "Dungeon Dance"
2. "Poison Moon"
3. "I Fire Myself"
4. "The Bell"
5. "Painted Horses"
6. "The Hour Glass"
7. "13 Bees"
8. "The Golden Fruit"
9. "Whisper from the Tree"
10. "1542"
11. "Valley of One Thousand Perfumes"
12. "Tiger Rising"
13. "An-Deluzion"
14. "The Fox and Hound"
15. "Rider on the Stormy Sea"
