= The Age of Backwards E.P. =

EP by The Spells
- Released: June 8, 1999
- Label: K Records

Professional ratings
Review scores
Source	Rating
Allmusic	4/5 stars
Pitchfork Media	(4.4/10)

The Age of Backwards E.P. was the first release by the short-lived band The Spells, a collaboration between Carrie Brownstein and Mary Timony.

The group also released a second E.P. entitled "Bat Vs. Bird" in 2008, consisting of material recorded in 2000. It contained 4 songs and totaled about 9 minutes. "Bat Vs. Bird," with its more prominent percussion (as opposed to the subdued backbeats of "The Age of Backwards") and overall "full band" sound, was more of a promise of what was to come from Wild Flag, which was composed of Mary Timony, Carrie Brownstein, Janet Weiss, and Rebecca Cole.

== Track listing ==
1. "The Age of Backwards"
2. "Octaves Apart"
3. "Number One Fan"
4. "Can't Explain"
