= Golden Street =

Studio album by the Minders
- Released: March 20, 2001
- Genre: Indie pop
- Label: spinART

The Minders chronology
Cul-De-Sacs and Dead Ends (1999)	Golden Street (2001)	The Future's Always Perfect (2003)

Professional ratings
Review scores
Source	Rating
AllMusic	3/5 stars
Pitchfork Media	(5.8/10)

Golden Street is the second studio album by the pop band the Minders. It was released in 2001 on spinART.

== Track listing ==
All songs written by Martyn Leaper, except for where noted.

1. "Golden Street" - 3:07
2. "Light" (Leaper, Rebecca Cole) - 2:11
3. "Treehouse - 4:10
4. "Hand on Heart" - 2:58
5. "We Never Shout" (Leaper, Cole) - 4:11
6. "Give Me Strength" - 2:32
7. "Right as Rain" - 4:15
8. "Instrumental" (Cole) - 0:57
9. "Sleeping Through Everything" - 2:17
10. "If You're Lonely" - 2:36
11. "Middle of the Part" - 3:24
12. "Nice Day for It" (Leaper, Cole) - 7:21
13. "Easy Now" - 3:09
