= Prude (disambiguation) =

A prude is a person who is described as (or would describe themselves as) being concerned with decorum or propriety, significantly in excess of normal prevailing standards.

Prude may also refer to:

- Pirate Prude, the 1994 debut EP by American indie rock band Helium
- Ronnie Prude (born 1982), American football player
- The Prude (French: La Puritaine), a 1986 French-Belgian drama film directed by Jacques Doillon
- The Prude's Fall (AKA Dangerous Virtue), a 1925 British silent drama film directed by Graham Cutts
