= Capsize 7 =

American indie rock band

- Origin: Chapel Hill, North Carolina
- Genres: Indie rock
- Years active: 1991–1997
- Labels: Caroline
- Members: Geoff Abell; Mike Jackson; Joe Taylor; Chris Toms
- Past members: David Soliday

Capsize 7 was an indie rock band from Chapel Hill, North Carolina that was active during the 1990s. The band's members were Mike Jackson, Chris Toms, Joe Taylor, and Geoff Abell. Their sound has been compared to that of other, better-known indie rock bands from the same region and era, including Polvo, Superchunk, and the Archers of Loaf.

== History ==
After releasing two 7" singles, Capsize 7 released the 10" EP Recline and Go on Hep Cat Records in 1995. The band spent an entire year refining their sound to work on their debut album. The band recorded the album's tracks in a club in Chapel Hill. The resulting album, Mephisto, was released on Caroline Records in 1995. In 1996, the band performed at Lollapalooza.

After releasing Mephisto, Capsize 7 traveled to California to record a follow-up album with Mark Trombino. They intended to release this album on Caroline Records as well, only to be dropped by the label shortly thereafter. The band's former frontman, Joe Taylor, said in 2008 that he eventually hoped to release this album through his own label, Pig Zen Space. The album, entitled Horsefly, was subsequently released through Pig Zen Space in 2010.

== Discography ==
- Recline and Go (Hep Cat 10", 1995)
- Mephisto (Caroline, 1995)
