= Alex Maiolo =

American musician and activist

Alex Maiolo is an American musician, writer, and health care reform advocate from Chapel Hill / Carrboro Orange County, North Carolina, currently living in San Francisco.

== Journalism and writing ==
Maiolo writes about music and recording as a senior contributor to Tape Op magazine, and has contributed to Premier Guitar magazine. In 2015 he became a regular writer for Reverb.com's interviews and tutorial pages. He currently contributes to the UK-based music and culture outlets Louder Than War and The Quietus. Alex is considered an authority on effect pedals, and has contributed to the 2019 book Pedal Crush by Danish author Kim Bjørn. Additionally, he authored two chapters to the 2020 book Patch & Tweak With Moog, by the same author. He writes about music and culture, focusing on Scandinavia, for Fashion Music Style, aka FMS-Mag, and has done press for Danish artists, including Kasper Bjørke, Chorus Grant, TOM and his Computer, GLAS, and Trentemøller.

== Music ==
Maiolo composes for modular synthesizer, solo, and with collaborators, under the monikers Action Group, and TRIPLE X SNAXXX. Both projects are equally influenced by Motorik, aka Krautrock music, Suzanne Ciani, Psychedelia, Detroit techno, ambient music, and Giorgio Moroder. Notable performances include Moogfest 2019, and paired with Jonas Bjerre of Mew.

Action Group, which usually involves musical partner Nick Williams, has played in ten countries, with notable performances at Tallinn Music Week, WORM (Rotterdam), 59 Rivoli's 25th anniversary, and two live sets on Kiosk Radio in 2024.

In October 2021, in cooperation with the Telia Company he collaborated with Bjerre, Erki Pärnoja, and Jonas Kaarnamets for Themes For Great Cities: Tallinn, the first in a series of concept pieces celebrating cities that receive less attention than the usual suspects. It premiered at Tallinn Music Week. President Kersti Kaljulaid was in attendance. Past collaboration and curatorial work includes The Suburban Summit, near Copenhagen Denmark, a one-week writing project with Toko Yasuda, John Schmersal, Bo Madsen, Dave Allen of Gang of Four, and Nils Gröndahl, among others.

He has played electric guitar in the garage rock / psychedelic rock band Lacy Jags, the pop band Fan Modine, bass guitar for the Chapel Hill neo-psychedelic band Violet Vector and the Lovely Lovelies, and guitar with Tim Sommer's ambient pop band Hi Fi Sky.

In 2010 he was asked by Chris Stamey to aid in organizing a live performance of Big Star's Third/Sister Lovers record with guest musicians including Jody Stephens, the only surviving member of the band, Mitch Easter, Will Rigby, and Mike Mills of R.E.M. The performance was repeated at Webster Hall, in New York City, on March 26, 2011, again with Stephens, Easter, Rigby, and Mills, and also included Michael Stipe, Matthew Sweet, Norman Blake of Teenage Fanclub, Ira Kaplan, Tift Merritt, and many other guest musicians.

Maiolo is also a recordist whose work has been featured on the John Peel show. In 2010 he opened Seriously Adequate Studio, a small, two room facility, where notables such as Brian Paulson, Lost in the Trees, The Kingsbury Manx, Schooner, Demon Eye, and Merge Records recording artists Polvo and The Love Language have worked.

In 2015 he became a voting member of National Academy of Recording Arts and Sciences (aka The Grammys), Producers & Engineers Wing. He also serves South by Southwest Music Festival in an advisory capacity.

== Activism ==
Maiolo is an advocate for health care reform in the United States, particularly the issue of health insurance access for musicians and other creative professionals. He supports a comprehensive national health insurance plan for all United States citizens.

He has presented on the need for affordable health insurance options for musicians at conferences including South by Southwest, CMJ Music Marathon, the SF MusicTech Summit, the Creative Chicago Expo, and the Pitchfork Music Festival. He has been interviewed on the subject for publications including Pitchfork Media, Spin, the Chicago Tribune, Crawdaddy!, Time, and contributed op-eds to the Chicago Tribune and Billboard.

From 2001 until 2017, Maiolo has worked with the national non-profit organization Future of Music Coalition. In 2005, Maiolo and the Future of Music Coalition received a grant from the Nathan Cummings Foundation to develop the Health Insurance Navigation Tool (HINT), a free service offering musicians advice and information about their health insurance options.

On May 28, 2010, Maiolo and other Carrboro-area musicians performed in a tribute concert remembering recently deceased Big Star lead singer Alex Chilton. Because Chilton was uninsured at the time of his death, Chilton's widow opted to donate the proceeds of the concert to HINT.

In 2016 he had a featured role in the film Boycott Band, a mockumentary produced by McKinney to call attention to the futility of North Carolina's House Bill 2, also known as Bathroom Bill, which discriminates against transgender people. It received high praise from trade journals such as Adweek.
