= Wild Flag =

American indie rock/post-punk supergroup

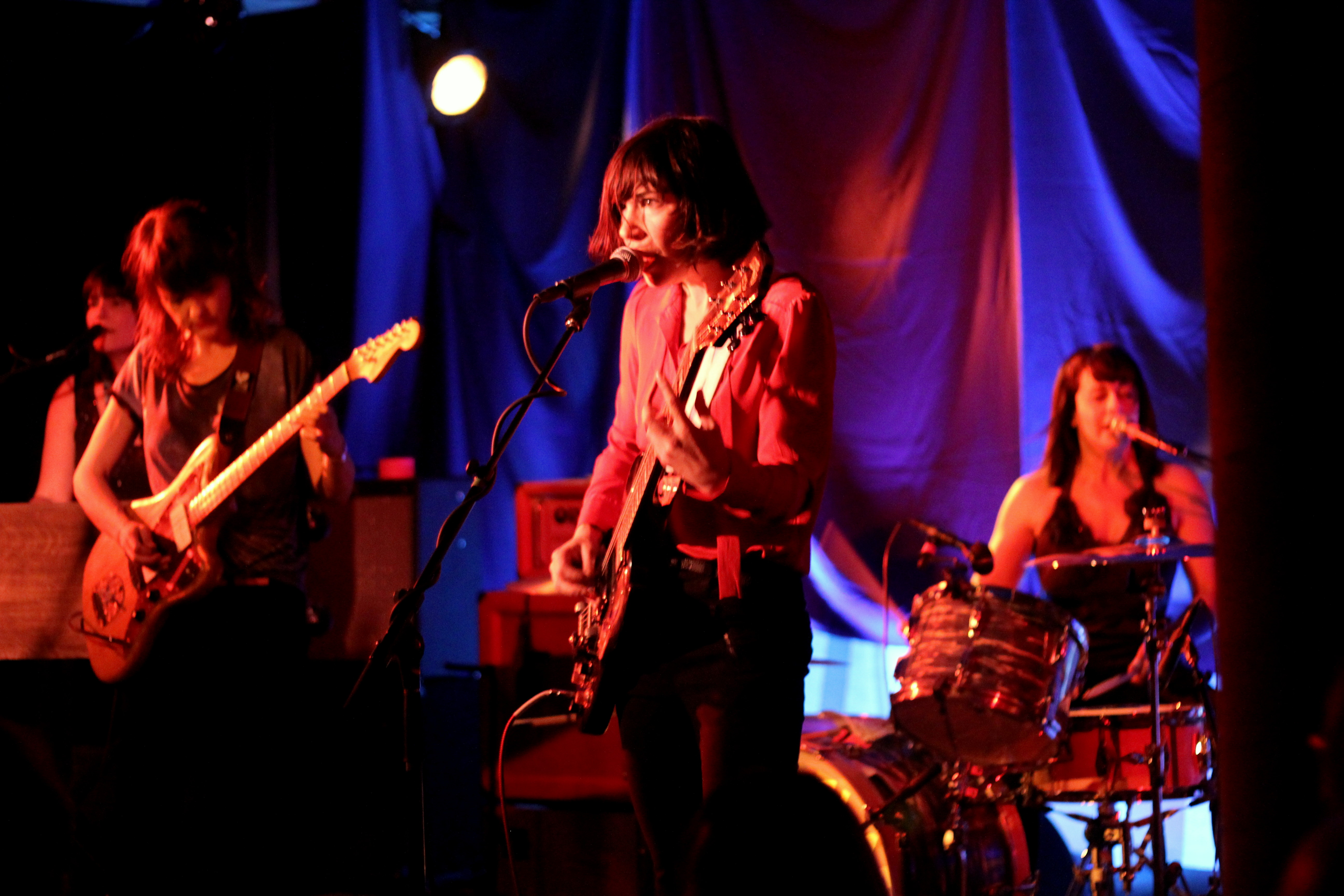
- Wild Flag performing in November 2011

Background information
- Origin: Portland, Oregon and Washington, D.C., United States
- Genres: Indie rock
- Years active: 2010–2014
- Labels: Merge; Wichita
- Past members: Carrie Brownstein; Mary Timony; Janet Weiss; Rebecca Cole
- Website: Wild Flag on Myspace

Wild Flag was an American four-piece indie rock group based in Portland, Oregon and Washington, D.C. The group consisted of Carrie Brownstein (vocals, guitar), Mary Timony (vocals, guitar), Rebecca Cole (keyboards, backing vocals) and Janet Weiss (drums, backing vocals), who were ex-members of the groups Sleater-Kinney, Helium and the Minders.

== Musical influences ==
The members of Wild Flag have extensive musical histories prior to forming this band. Carrie Brownstein played in Excuse 17 from 1993 to 1995 and then more famously in Sleater-Kinney from 1994 until 2006 when the band went on hiatus. Janet Weiss had drummed simultaneously for both Quasi and Sleater-Kinney throughout the late nineties and early 2000s, afterwards contributing to Bright Eyes, Stephen Malkmus and the Jicks and Conor Oberst albums. Mary Timony played guitar and shared vocals in Autoclave in the early nineties, then went on to do the same for the band Helium from 1992 to 1997. Afterwards, she played with Brownstein in the short-lived band the Spells, which released one EP on K Records in 1999, and also released various solo albums before contributing her skills to Wild Flag. Rebecca Cole played drums in the Minders from 1996 to 2008 before becoming the keyboardist for Wild Flag.

== History ==
The existence of Wild Flag was first announced by Carrie Brownstein via a blog post on National Public Radio's All Songs Considered blog, of which she was a contributor, in September 2010. She said that she had called together her friends a year ago and tried to form a band:

Chemistry cannot be manufactured or forced, so WILD FLAG was not a sure thing, it was a "maybe," a "possibility." But after a handful of practice sessions, spread out over a period of months, I think we all realized that we could be greater than the sum of our parts, not four disparate puzzle pieces trying to make sense of the other, but a cohesive and dynamic whole.

A Facebook page was soon put up with very little information about the band. No songs were posted and the biography was short and strange: "What is the sound of an avalanche taking out a dolphin? What do get when you cross a hamburger with a hot dog? The answer is: WILD FLAG."

Brownstein and Timony previously collaborated in the late 1990s, when they were still in Sleater-Kinney and Helium respectively. Their side project band the Spells released one EP, The Age of Backwards, on K Records in 1999, and played a single live show in Olympia. In the summer of 2000 they recorded four more songs for a prospective album, but it was never completed. The four songs remained unreleased until 2008 when Brownstein released them online through National Public Radio's Monitor Mix blog.

The first Wild Flag single, "Future Crimes" backed with "Glass Tambourine", was released on Record Store Day 2011.

A second single, "Romance" was premiered June 18, 2011.

Their eponymous debut album was released on September 13, 2011 on Merge Records.

They appeared on Late Night with Jimmy Fallon on January 6, 2012.

By 2014, the band was no longer active. In an interview, Brownstein stated, "We had a fun run… but all the logistics started seeming not quite worth it."

=== Touring ===
The band's initial tour dates in 2010 stuck to the West Coast. They played a small kickoff show in Olympia, Washington to a crowd of 200 fans. The band traveled from Washington down to the state of California throughout November 2010. They were also slated to appear at the South By Southwest festival in March 2011.

Wild Flag announced on their Facebook page on January 20, 2011 that a 7" record would be pressed and available for purchase exclusively at their shows for the month of March, and then for sale to the general public on Record Store Day 2011.

Tour dates for the East coast were announced for the month of March, including two dates in New York City where they open for Bright Eyes. The band was chosen by Les Savy Fav to perform at the ATP Nightmare Before Christmas festival that they co-curate in December 2011 in Minehead, England.

== Discography ==
- Wild Flag (2011) US No. 53

=== Singles ===
- "Future Crimes" backed with "Glass Tambourine" (2011)
- "Romance" (2011)
- "Boom" (2011)
- "Electric Band" (2011)

=== Split Singles ===
- Mission of Burma / Wild Flag – "What They Tell Me" / "Boom" (2012)

=== Music Videos ===
- "Romance" (2011)
- "Electric Band" (2011)
