= Shaky hands =

Shaky Hands may refer to:

- The Shaky Hands, a Portland, Oregon-based rock group
- Tremor of the hands or limbs
