= Joggers =

Joggers may refer to:

- The band The Joggers
- Sweatpants, long trousers used for exercise or as casual wear (British English)
- Participants in the sport of jogging
