= Hooray for Tuesday =

Studio album by the Minders
- Released: 1998
- Studio: Pet Sounds, Denver, Colorado, US
- Genre: Psychedelic rock
- Length: 27:05
- Label: spinART
- Producer: Robert Schneider

The Minders chronology
| Hooray for Tuesday (1998) | Cul-De-Sacs and Dead Ends (1999) |

Professional ratings
Review scores
| Source | Rating |
|---|---|
| AllMusic | 4/5 stars |
| PopMatters | 8/10 |

Hooray for Tuesday is the debut album by Denver-based Elephant 6 band the Minders, released in 1998 on spinART. It was produced by Robert Schneider, who worked on it before and after his production work on In the Aeroplane Over the Sea.

== Track listing ==
All tracks are written by Martyn Leaper except where noted.

| No. | Title | Writer(s) | Length |
|---|---|---|---|
| 1. | "Hooray for Tuesday" | | 3:11 |
| 2. | "Yeah Yeah Yeah" | M. Willhite | 2:09 |
| 3. | "Comfortably Tucked Up Inside" | | 2:26 |
| 4. | "Pauline" | | 2:24 |
| 5. | "Our Man in Bombay" | | 2:05 |
| 6. | "I've Been Wondering" | | 1:50 |
| 7. | "More and More" | | 1:48 |
| 8. | "Pass It Around" | | 1:51 |
| 9. | "Joey's Pez" | | 1:53 |
| 10. | "Red Bus" | | 2:40 |
| 11. | "Bubble" | R. Cole | 1:41 |
| 12. | "Frida" | | 3:52 |
| 13. | "I'm So Low" |
| Total length: | | | 27:05 |

== Personnel ==
- Artwork [Art Direction] – M.Willhite, S. Willhite
- Artwork [Original Painting, Art Direction] – M. Leaper
- Bass, Vocals – Marc Willhite
- Drums, Vocals – Rebecca Cole
- Flute, Saxophone [Alto] – Merisa Bissinger
- Guitar, Vocals – Jeff Almond
- Keyboards, Guitar, Producer, Recorded By – Robert Schneider
- Photography By – Steve Gjevre
- Trombone – Rick Benjamin
- Vocals, Guitar [Rhythm] – Martyn Leaper
- Written-By – Marc Willhite (tracks: 2), Martyn Leaper (tracks: 1, 3 to 10, 12, 13), Rebecca C. Cole (tracks: 11)
