= Celebrate the New Dark Age =

EP by Polvo
- Released: 1994
- Genre: Indie rock, math rock
- Length: 25:42
- Label: Merge

Polvo chronology
| Today's Active Lifestyles (1993) | Celebrate the New Dark Age (1994) | This Eclipse (1995) |

Celebrate the New Dark Age is an EP by Polvo.

== Background & Release ==
It was recorded at Duck Kee Studios by Jerry Kee and released on Merge Records in 1994.

== Reception ==
Professional ratings
Review scores
| Source | Rating |
|---|---|
| AllMusic | 3/5 stars |
| Robert Christgau | (1-star Honorable Mention) |
| The Great Alternative & Indie Discography | 5/10 |

The AllMusic review is quite positive, with reviewer Tracy Frey calling it "filled with the band's chaotic, twisted guitars and sarcastic, witty lyrics." The tracks "Fractured (Like Chandeliers)" and "Tragic Carpet Ride" were singled out as "two amazing guitar songs" and "Every Holy Shroud" was compared to Pavement. Robert Christgau gave the EP a one-star "honorable mention" indicating "a worthy effort consumers attuned to its overriding aesthetic or individual vision may well like", picking "Fractured (Like Chandeliers)" and "Every Holy Shroud" as highlights and writing: "how dark can it be if it's so full of guitars?" David Sprague's assessment of the release for Trouser Press is mixed to mildly positive, writing that "The energy level is a bit higher [...] but Bowie and Brylawski still noodle with virtually absolute tunnel vision. The fact that both concentrate on fractured chord disseminations ("progressions" is a bit too linear a description) rather than offer up any tangible leads can create a sort of eustachial whiplash [...]." He writes, however, that the "band is beginning to show flashes of proficiency at structuring songs" and that the EP is more stylistically consistent in comparison to their previous releases.

Jon Pareles wrote for The New York Times: "where Sonic Youth is thoughtful, Polvo lashes out, surly and cynical. "Every Holy Shroud" [...] mocks rock critics as it declares, "I know who it sounds like, I hope they care," amid guitar parts that turn tangles into snarls [...] Polvo's Sonic Youth roots are clear but unremarkable; Polvo takes the ideas in new directions." Tom Ridge reviewed the EP very positively for The Wire, calling it "vital and engaging music, challenging and accessible once it has beckoned you in" and citing it as proof that guitar-led music was not dead.

Ryan Adams listed the EP as one of ten records that changed his life, writing: "Their first record was good, but this was better, because it was so scrappy. People said Polvo sounded like Sonic Youth, but I always thought they had their own thing going on. This was like music from a cartoon."

== Track listing ==
1. "Fractured (Like Chandeliers)" - 5:19
2. "City Spirit" - 2:55
3. "Tragic Carpet Ride" - 3:20
4. "Solitary Set" - 2:17
5. "Every Holy Shroud" - 5:55
6. "Old Lystra" - 2:45
7. "Virtual Cold" - 3:09
