= The Picture Is Dead =

The Picture Is Dead is an indie rock band from Washington D.C. The band consists of Bryan Cornell (synth, effects), Sam Serafy (vocals), Patrick Timony (brother of Mary Timony) (effects, keyboards), and James Wolf (violin). Darryl Dardenne once played with the band, but as of June 2006, is not part of the lineup. They have opened for Bardo Pond, Mary Timony Band, and fellow Washington D.C. band The Aquarium.

== Music and performances ==
Their music is often very dark in both harmonic structure and lyrical content, and has a fluid sound due to their analogue electronic instrumentation. Their lyrics have been described as dry and witty. Their songs explore themes such as love and relationships ("I'm a Girl" and "Flowers & Candy"), prejudice ("Don't Shoot"), and death ("Visiting Day"). They place great emphasis on their live performances, which are accompanied by videos projected behind the band. (The origin of the band's name comes from the idea that photographs and drawings are merely illusions and not the real, living things they depict, hence "the picture is dead"). Some members of the band wear "scientist" style labcoats during their performances, for reasons that are unclear.

== Instruments ==
Instruments used by Bryan Cornell include Frostwave Resonator, Moog CP251, Moog MF103 (Phaser), Korg MS10, Metasonix TM-1SE, Blacet Time Machine, Blacet I/O module, Boss DD5 Delay, Mackie 1202 board, Shure SM 58 mic, Casio PT-1.

== Discography ==
- The Picture Is Dead (EP) (2005)
