= Ex Hex =

Studio album by Mary Timony
- Released: April 19, 2005
- Studio: Inner Ear, Arlington, Virginia
- Genre: Math rock
- Label: Lookout!

Mary Timony chronology
The Golden Dove (2002)	Ex Hex (2005)	Untame the Tiger (2024)

Professional ratings
Review scores
Source	Rating
AllMusic	4/5 stars
Pitchfork	7.3/10
PopMatters	7/10

Ex Hex is the third solo album from Mary Timony. It was released April 19, 2005 on Lookout! Records.

== Reception and legacy ==
On a 2016 list by BrooklynVegan, Ex Hex placed eighth out of Lookout! Records' 10 "must-have" albums. The site's Andrew Sacher wrote that "its effect on modern music is strong", seeing its tracks like "9x3" and "W.O.W." anticipate the band Speedy Ortiz's sound.

== Track listing ==
1. "On the Floor" – 4:25
2. "Friend to J.C." – 3:26
3. "Silence" – 6:10
4. "In the Grass" – 4:33
5. "Return to Pirates" – 3:51
6. "Hard Times Are Hard" – 4:34
7. "9x3" – 4:15
8. "W.O.W." – 2:59
9. "Moon Song" – 3:38
10. "Harmony" – 2:15
11. "Backwards/Forwards" – 6:40
