= Siberia (Polvo album) =

Studio album by Polvo
- Released: September 30, 2013
- Genres: Indie rock, progressive rock
- Length: 45:05
- Label: Merge

Polvo chronology
In Prism (2009)	Siberia (2013)

Siberia is Polvo's sixth studio album. It was released on Merge Records on September 30, 2013. Unlike its predecessor, 2009's In Prism, the album was not accompanied with a tour.

An official music video was created for the track "Light, Raking."

== Reception ==
Professional ratings
Aggregate scores
Source	Rating
Metacritic	81/100
Review scores
Source	Rating
AllMusic	4/5 stars
Blurt	4/5 stars
Exclaim!	6/10
The Line of Best Fit	7.5/10
Mondo Sonoro	8/10
Ox-Fanzine	4.5/5 stars
Pitchfork	8.3/10
PopMatters	7/10 stars
Rolling Stone	3.5/5 stars
Under the Radar	7/10 stars

Siberia, like its predecessor, received universal critical acclaim, with a Metacritic score of 81/100 based on 12 reviews. In a highly positive review, Stuart Berman of Pitchfork noted that the band's "subtle classic-rock quotes—like the “Tom Sawyer”-worthy arpeggio that underpins the tranquil “Changed”—serve to make Polvo’s complex guitarchitecture more inviting to the uninitiated" & praised "Ash Bowie and Dave Brylawski’s more emotionally revelatory approach to their vocals." Fred Thomas of AllMusic called the album "a step up from Polvo's original return to the scene. Though the songs here would have fit in with the best of their earlier phases, they manage to inject deeper subtleties and emotional crosscurrents than even their best work from the '90s without getting too soft in the process."

Sean Kirkpatrick of the Paper Chase ranked Siberia his 2nd favorite album of the year. Radical Dads included it among their favorite albums of 2013. Pharaoh Overlord picked the track "Total Immersion" as one of their favorites, calling it "[p]erfectly twisted progressive pop music. All these years I’ve admired Polvo’s exceptional arrangements. I just wonder how some musicians can be so advanced. Music like this cannot be made alone, this needs a collective mind."

=== Accolades ===
Year-end accolades
Publication	Country	Accolade	Rank
Magnet	US	Top 25 Albums of 2013	15
Aquarium Drunkard	US	2013 Year in Review	
Blurt	US	The Blurt Top 75 Albums	69
Las Vegas Weekly	US	Best of 2013: Albums (Spencer Patterson)	8
Earbuddy	US	Earbuddy’s Best Albums of 2013	69
Rolling Stone	US	27 Best Albums You Didn’t Hear in 2013	

== Track listing ==
1. "Total Immersion" - 6:26
2. "Blues Is Loss" - 6:52
3. "Light, Raking" - 4:31
4. "Changed" - 3:24
5. "The Water Wheel" - 7:57
6. "Old Maps" - 4:11
7. "Some Songs" - 5:32
8. "Anchoress" - 6:12

== Credits ==
Polvo are credited as the primary artist. The remainder of the credits have been adapted from AllMusic:

Personnel	Credit
Mitch Easter	Guitar, Mixing
Jeff Lipton	Mastering
Brian Paulson	Mixing
Maria Rice	Mastering Assistant
