= Rips (album) =

Studio album by Ex Hex
- Released: October 7, 2014
- Recorded: April 2014
- Genre: Garage rock; power pop; rock and roll
- Length: 35:09
- Label: Merge
- Producer: Ex Hex; Jonah Takagi

Ex Hex chronology
Rips (2014)	It's Real (2019)

Rips is the debut studio album by American indie rock band Ex Hex. It was released on October 7, 2014 by Merge Records.

== Critical reception ==
Professional ratings
Aggregate scores
Source	Rating
AnyDecentMusic?	8.1/10
Metacritic	84/100
Review scores
Source	Rating
AllMusic	4/5 stars
Cuepoint (Expert Witness)	A−
Exclaim!	9/10
Financial Times	4/5 stars
The Guardian	5/5 stars
Mojo	4/5 stars
NME	9/10
Pitchfork	8.4/10
Rolling Stone	3.5/5 stars
Uncut	8/10

Rips holds a score of 84 out of 100 on the review aggregate site Metacritic, indicating "universal acclaim". Pitchfork writer Aaron Leitko gave Rips a "Best New Music" designation and remarked that the album "mostly finds the band walking away from Timony's established voice and pushing toward something more direct and energetic—embracing the past, but also blowing things up and starting again." Heather Phares of AllMusic wrote that Rips "mixes simple pleasures and complicated ones into a completely life-affirming debut", while Laura Snapes of NME called the album "a reminder of rock’s glorious communal potential".

NME named Rips the tenth best album of 2014. It also placed at number 11 on The Village Voice's Pazz & Jop year-end critics' poll.

=== Year-end lists ===
Year	Publication	Work	List	Rank	Ref.
2014	Pitchfork	Rips	The 50 Best Albums of 2014	26	
2014	Pitchfork	"Don't Wanna Lose"	The 100 Best Tracks of 2014	22	
2014	The Village Voice	Rips	Pazz + Jop: The Top 50 Albums of 2014	11	

== Track listing ==
All tracks are written by Mary Timony, except "How You Got That Girl" and "Radio On", written by Betsy Wright.

No.	Title	Length
1.	"Don't Wanna Lose"	2:27
2.	"Beast"	3:14
3.	"Waste Your Time"	2:47
4.	"You Fell Apart"	2:45
5.	"How You Got That Girl"	3:06
6.	"Waterfall"	2:05
7.	"Hot and Cold"	2:35
8.	"Radio On"	2:41
9.	"New Kid"	2:57
10.	"War Paint"	3:57
11.	"Everywhere"	3:18
12.	"Outro"	3:17
Total length:		35:09

== Personnel ==
Ex Hex

- Laura Harris – drums
- Mary Timony – guitar, vocals
- Betsy Wright – bass guitar

Additional personnel

- Mitch Easter – engineering
- Bobby Harlow – mixing
- Dennis Kane – tracking
- Johann Kauth – artwork, layout
- Jeff Lipton – mastering
- Maria Rice – mastering assistant
- Jonah Takagi – production, tracking, photography
- Missy Thangs – recording assistant

== Charts ==
Chart (2014)	Peak position
US Billboard 200	170
US Top Alternative Albums (Billboard)	24
US Top Rock Albums (Billboard)	46
