= Untame the Tiger =

Studio album by Mary Timony
- Released: February 23, 2024
- Length: 39:53
- Label: Merge
- Producer: Mary Timony; Dennis Kane; Joe Wong

Mary Timony chronology
Ex Hex (2005)	Untame the Tiger (2024)

Untame the Tiger is the fourth solo studio album by American singer-songwriter Mary Timony, released on February 23, 2024, through Merge Records. It is her first solo album in 19 years, following 2005's Ex Hex. The album received positive reviews from critics.

== Critical reception ==
Professional ratings
Aggregate scores
Source	Rating
Metacritic	78/100
Review scores
Source	Rating
Mojo	3/5 stars
Pitchfork	7.6/10
Uncut	8/10

Untame the Tiger received a score of 78 out of 100 on review aggregator Metacritic based on 10 critics' reviews, indicating "generally favorable" reception. Uncut called it "notable for uncensored emotional gloom and an evergreen college sound", while Mojo stated that "the melancholy feels more goth than hippy and, ultimately, both the sounds and lyrics feel unresolved". Reviewing the album for Pitchfork, Sadie Sartini Garner described it as containing "intensely melodic, disarmingly straightforward songs that feel as loose and casual as old friends" and felt that it "shows that she's determined to avoid ever making depressing music again. Even as it confronts sadness, the album is spritely [and] frequently bright".

== Track listing ==
All tracks are written by Mary Timony.

Untame the Tiger track listing
No.	Title	Length
1.	"No Thirds"	6:16
2.	"Summer"	2:47
3.	"Dominoes"	3:48
4.	"Looking for the Sun"	4:34
5.	"The Guest"	3:53
6.	"Don't Disappear"	3:43
7.	"The Dream"	4:54
8.	"Untame the Tiger"	5:24
9.	"Not the Only One"	4:34
Total length:		39:53

== Personnel ==
Musicians

- Mary Timony – lead vocals, guitar
- Chad Molter – bass guitar (tracks 1, 2, 4, 8, 9)
- Dave Mattacks – drums (tracks 1, 2, 4, 8, 9)
- Betsy Wright – background vocals (tracks 1, 5, 9)
- Melissa Quinley – background vocals (track 1)
- David Christian – drums (tracks 3, 5, 7), percussion (8)
- Dennis Kane – bass guitar (track 3), background vocals (5, 9), guitar (8)
- Joe Wong – percussion (track 3); bass guitar, drums (6)
- Brian Betancourt – bass guitar (tracks 5, 7)

Technical

- Mary Timony – production (all tracks), mixing (tracks 1, 2, 4, 5, 7–9)
- Dennis Kane – production, engineering (all tracks); mixing (tracks 1, 2, 4, 5, 7–9)
- Joe Wong – production (all tracks), engineering (tracks 1, 2, 4, 6, 8, 9)
- John Agnello – mixing (tracks 1, 2, 4, 5, 7–9)
- Dave Fridmann – mixing (tracks 3, 6)
- Oliver Roman – engineering (tracks 1, 2, 8, 9)
- T.J. Lipple – engineering (3)
- J. Robbins – engineering (5, 7)
- Reese Clutter – engineering assistance (3)
