= Helium (band) =

American indie rock band

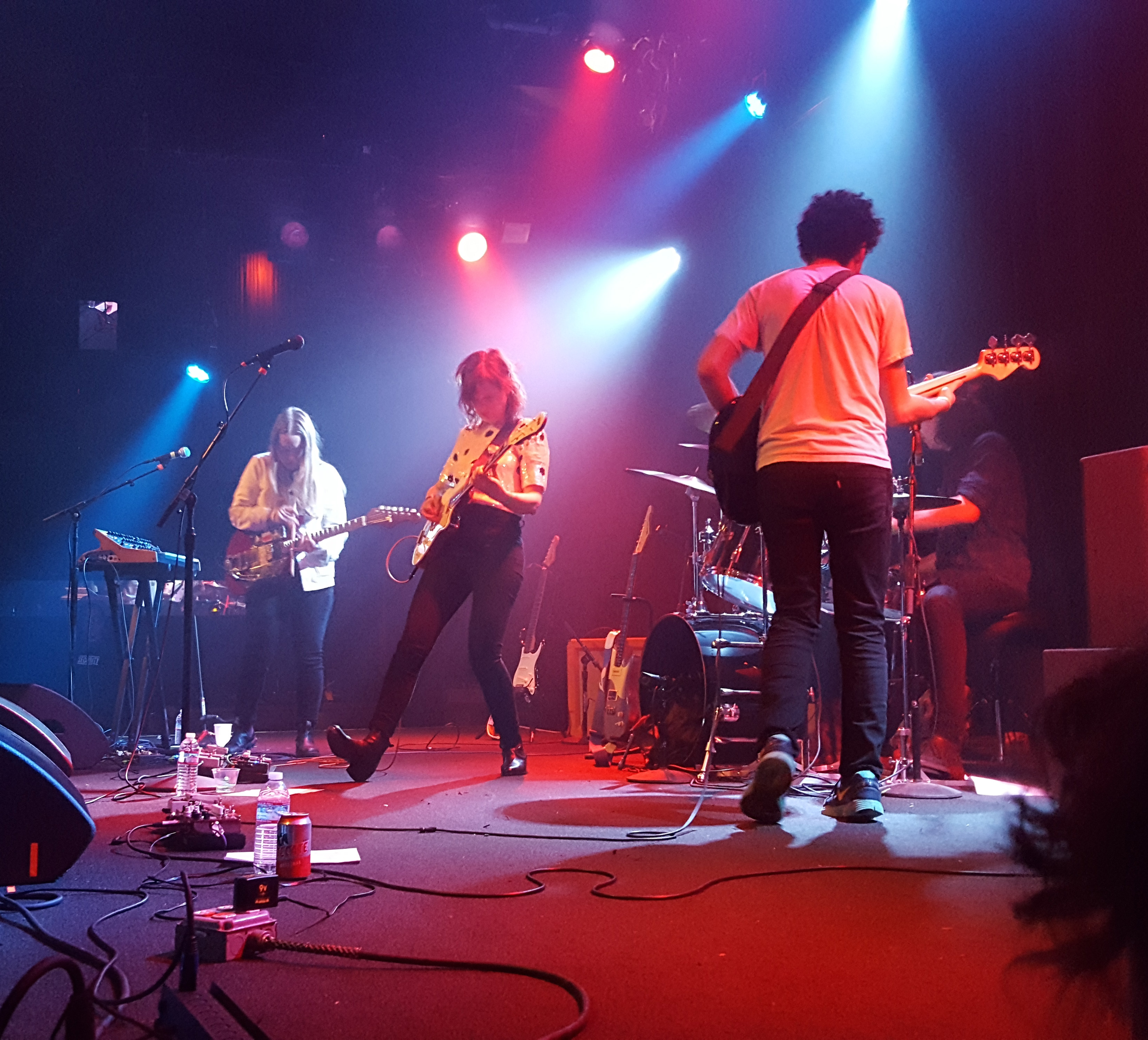
- Mary Timony Plays Helium with Hospitality, San Francisco, 2018

Background information
- Origin: Boston, Massachusetts
- Genres: Indie rock, alternative rock, post-punk
- Years active: 1992–1998
- Label: Matador Records
- Past members: Brian Dunton; Mary Timony; Ash Bowie; Shawn Devlin

Helium was an American indie rock band fronted by Mary Timony. The band formed during the summer of 1992. Between 1992 and 1997, they released two full-length albums, three EPs and several singles.

== History ==
Under the original moniker of "Chupa", the band's founding members were vocalist/guitarist Mary Lou Lord, guitarist Jason Hatfield (Juliana Hatfield's brother), drummer Shawn King Devlin, and bassist Brian Dunton. Devlin and Dunton were both also in the band Dumptruck before founding Chupa. Mary Timony, formerly of the band Autoclave, replaced Lord on vocals and guitar shortly after formation, as Lord was reluctant to use electric instrumentation. Following Lord's departure, Chupa released a self-titled cassette and they self-distributed it in 1991. After Hatfield departed from the band, their name was changed to "Helium" and his position was not replaced; thus, the lineup of Devlin, Dunton, and Timony remained as a trio.

Timony was known for her husky, vibrato-less and monotone singing style. The band's record label, Matador Records, likened Timony's vocals to Kim Wilde and Debbie Harry.

=== Releases ===
Their first release was a 7" single entitled "The American Jean" (1993), which was followed by the 7" "Hole in the Ground". They released their first EP, Pirate Prude, in 1994. Shortly after the release of Pirate Prude, Dunton left the band and Polvo guitarist Ash Bowie, boyfriend of Timony at the time, joined on bass. In 1995, they released their first full-length release, The Dirt of Luck, and played the second stage of Lollapalooza. This was followed by the four song Superball EP. Adam Lasus produced and engineered The Dirt of Luck, Pirate Prude, and all of Helium's singles up to 1995.

In 1997, the group released the EP No Guitars before releasing their second album, The Magic City. This album featured synths and analog drum machine sounds, as opposed to their previous guitar-centered releases.

Commenting on the band's new direction, in an interview with the Boston Phoenix in 1997, Timony said: "It seemed natural for a girl my age to be expressing anger in music. For whatever psychological reason, I found it easier to express it in my songs than any other way. Writing out of anger is an easy framework, and that's one reason I don't do it now. I remember hearing Patti Smith say that she stopped playing music because she wasn't angry any more. I could totally relate, except that I want to keep playing. Lately I'm more into the idea that making music is fun. I want it to be a collaborative, creative thing, rather than using music as a tool."

The band toured the United States in early 1998 and disbanded shortly thereafter.

=== Film and television ===
The band makes an appearance in the cult 1994 road movie, Half-cocked. On television, two of the band's music videos, "Pat's Trick" and "XXX", were critiqued by Beavis and Butt-head.

=== Post-Helium ===
Timony began a solo career in 2000 and Bowie released an album of old four-track recordings under the name Libraness. Timony was later a member of the bands Wild Flag and Ex Hex.

Matador Records reissued the band's two albums in March 2017, along with a new collection of rarities titled Ends With And. Timony consequently played two "Mary Timony Plays Helium" tours in the U.S., backed by members of the band Hospitality, in 2017 and 2018.

== Discography ==
=== Albums ===
Title	Year	Label
The Dirt of Luck	1995	Matador Records
The Magic City	1997	Matador Records

=== EPs ===
Title	Year	Label
Pirate Prude	1994	Matador Records
Superball+	1995	Matador Records
No Guitars	1997	Matador Records

=== Singles ===
Title	Year	Label
"The American Jean" (b/w "Termite Tree")	1992	Warped Records
"Hole in the Ground" (b/w "Lucy")	1993	Pop Narcotic (on orange vinyl)
"Pat's Trick" (b/w "Ghost Car")	1995	Matador Records

=== Compilations ===
Title	Year	Label
Rock Stars Kill	1994	Kill Rock Stars
Half-Cocked - The Motion Picture Soundtrack	1995	Matador Records
Ends With And	2017	Matador Records

=== Music videos ===
Year	Title	Director	Album
1994	"XXX"	David Kleiler	Pirate Prude
1995	"Pat's Trick"	David Kleiler	The Dirt of Luck
1995	"Superball"	Tryan George	The Dirt of Luck
1995	"Honeycomb"	Brett Vapnek	The Dirt of Luck
1997	"Leon's Space Song"		The Magic City
