= Fan Modine =

American indie pop band

Fan Modine is an American indie pop band, whose core member is singer and songwriter Gordon Zacharias. Originally based in Boston and New York City, Zacharias has lived in Carrboro, North Carolina since 2001.

His albums are recorded with a rotating collective of guest musicians, which has included Joan Wasser, Michael Tighe, Tim Fut, Dylan Williams, Parker Kindred, Ash Bowie, Alex Maiolo, Jeremy Chatelain, Chuck Johnson, Lee Waters, Michael Holland, Joe Pernice, Chris Stamey, Peter Holsapple, Kevin March, Chris Brokaw and Mitch Easter.

While living in Boston's Chinatown, Zacharias first developed a concept for a film exploring the experiences of an American pop star, Fandemian Kirk Modine, living in China. Although no film was ever made, his debut album Slow Road to Tiny Empire, released in 1998, was conceived as its soundtrack. He further explored the concept on his second album, 2004's Homeland.

His third album, Gratitude for the Shipper, was released in 2011, followed by Cause Célèbre in 2014.

== Discography ==
- Slow Road to Tiny Empire (1998)
- Homeland (2004)
- Gratitude for the Shipper (2011)
- Cause Célèbre (2014)
