= Pirate Prude =

EP by Helium
- Released: March 8, 1994
- Recorded: 1993
- Genre: Indie rock, Alternative rock, Noise pop
- Length: 28:40
- Label: Matador Records
- Producer: Helium; Adam Lasus

Helium chronology
Pirate Prude (1994)	The Dirt of Luck (1995)

Professional ratings
Review scores
Source	Rating
AllMusic	3/5 stars
Robert Christgau	(dud)
The Encyclopedia of Popular Music	3/5 stars

Pirate Prude is the debut EP from American indie rock band Helium. It was released March 8, 1994, on Matador Records. Its subject matter concerns prostitution.

== Critical reception ==
AllMusic wrote that the EP "is an uncompromising introduction to Mary Timony's mix of radical feminism and warped pop sensibilities." Trouser Press wrote that "Timony’s wavering guitar shimmers and undulates across the surface of 'XXX' and 'OOO,' songs that are every bit as distinct as those titles would indicate."

=== Legacy ===
In 2017, Paste's Robert Ham saw Pirate mark the point where Helium "hit their true stride". He called it "a supersonic leap forward both sonically and in terms of how Timony uses magical realism to address sexual politics and personal hurt". In 2024, Spin recognized the EP's 30th anniversary. The site wrote that it "felt as substantial as an album" and credited it with "establish[ing] Timony's reputation as an imaginative, provocative lyricist".

Tim Cedar of Part Chimp named Pirate amongst the most influential albums to him and his music. He cited "the way [Timony] uses distortion and creates tension" on guitar as impactful to his own playing.

== Track listing ==
1. "Baby Vampire Made Me" - 5:50
2. "Wanna Be a Vampire Too, Baby" - 2:23
3. "XXX" - 5:19
4. "OOO" - 5:44
5. "I'll Get You, I Mean It" - 2:21
6. "Love $$$" - 5:42
7. "[Surprise Ending]" - 1:16

== Personnel ==
- Mary Timony - Guitar, Vocals
- Brian Dunton - Bass
- Shawn King Devlin - Drums
- Adam Lasus - Producer
- Greg Calbi - Mastering
- Greg Jacobs - Accordion
- Carl Plaster - Drums
- R.E.D. - Engineer
