= Violet Vector and the Lovely Lovelies =

American pop and rock band

- Origin: Chapel Hill, North Carolina, United States
- Genres: Indie pop, Psychedelic, Neo-psychedelia, Garage rock
- Years active: 2007-present
- Labels: Holidays for Quince, Colorwheel Records
- Members: Karen Blanco; Amanda Brooks; Cathleen Keyser; Matt L'Esperance; Alex Maiolo
- Past members: Doug Edmunds, Jose Boyer, Jeff Dewitte, Robin Chen, Meg McKee
- Website: Violet Vector and the Lovely Lovelies' Myspace

Violet Vector and the Lovely Lovelies is an American indie sunshine pop/garage rock band formed in Chapel Hill, North Carolina, United States. They are part of the neo-psychedelia movement in the Chapel Hill music scene. The band consists of singer-songwriter Amanda Brooks (lead guitar, lead vocals), Karen Blanco (organ, electric piano), Cathleen Keyser (bells, glockenspiel, tambourine), Matt L'Esperance (drums), and Alex Maiolo (bass guitar).

== History ==
Upon moving to Chapel Hill, Brooks first met Karen Blanco in 2005, and Cathleen Keyser in 2006. Keyser learned how to play the glockenspiel, hand bells, and various other instruments. Later in 2007, after several line-up changes, Alex Maiolo was added on bass guitar. The then current drummer's abrupt withdrawal led to a quick cessation of studio recording and live performances. Alex Maiolo recruited his friend Doug Edmunds on drums.

The band gained momentum after several performances at Cat's Cradle, The Local 506, and Slim's Downtown in downtown Raleigh, in which they unintentionally impressed their future Chapel Hill indie record label, Holidays for Quince, into signing them and distributing their first album.

In 2008, Edmunds announced that he would be leaving the band to focus on his solo work but has filled in with the band since then. Currently Matt L'Esperance is the regular drummer.

== Influences ==
The band is influenced by the Kinks, the Beatles, Led Zeppelin, earlier Pink Floyd, and The Zombies.

== EP I ==
EP I album cover

=== Track listing ===
1. Can You Dig It?
2. Candyland
3. Make My Day
4. Serva Ad Manum
5. Double Axe

EP I was recorded by the band and mixed by Brian Paulson. The first song of the EP, "Can You Dig It?", has attracted attention via Myspace and various music blogs such as notable music blog Idolator.com, which announced "Can You Dig It" as their song of the year in 2007. The magazines Curve (magazine) and Paste (magazine), and blogs such as Eardrumsmusic.com and Indyweek.com agree.

== EP II ==
EP II was released in 2009.
