= Alex Arrowsmith =

American singer-songwriter (born 1982)

- Born: July 10, 1982 (age 44); Hood River, Oregon, US
- Origin: Portland, Oregon, US
- Genres: Alternative rock, indie rock, college rock, comedy
- Occupations: Musician, producer, engineer
- Instruments: Vocals, guitar, keyboards, drums, bass, mandolin
- Years active: 2001–present
- Label: Space Cassette
- Formerly of: The Minders, The Shaky Hands

Alex Michael Arrowsmith (born July 10, 1982) is a rock/pop musician from Portland, Oregon. He is best known for his work with the Minders and the Shaky Hands, as well as his solo catalog.

== Discography ==
=== Studio albums ===
Year	Title	Label
2001	Honey, I Shrunk The Meat Grinder	Ectoplasmic
2002	A Bunch of Songs	Ectoplasmic
2002	Sacramento Gold	Ectoplasmic
2003	The Brask	Ectoplasmic
2003	Crack House	Ectoplasmic
2004	The Albatross Project	Ectoplasmic
2005	Wharfless	Ectoplasmic
2005	The History of Fishes	Ectoplasmic
2006	Applewine	Ectoplasmic
2008	Missing Briefcase	Ectoplasmic
2009	Modernity Leave	Ectoplasmic
2010	Public Domain Rainbow	Ectoplasmic
2011	Quarks	Ectoplasmic
2011	Real Nights	Ectoplasmic
2012	Variations in the Pattern	Ectoplasmic
2015	Slow Clap	Space Cassette
2016	The Sky Beneath You	Space Cassette
2016	Songmonth	Space Cassette
2017	Songmonth II	Space Cassette
2018	Extrasolar Whim	Space Cassette
2021	Songmonth III	Space Cassette
2022	Songmonth IV	Space Cassette
2025	Footprints	Ectoplasmic

=== Compilations ===
Year	Title	Label
2003	The Wonder of the Underground Pressed on Plastic, Vol. 1 ("The Man with the Golden Touch")	Meow Meow
2005	Perceptions 2005 ("I Am The Ice Age")	MHCC
2006	Perceptions 2006 ("Engulf The Manatee" and "New Times And Fire Road")	MHCC
2007	Eartaste Sampler #1 ("Update Your Blog" and "I Hope You're Never Crushed By Something Heavy")	Eartaste
2007	Perceptions 2007 ("Plains of Mostly Still Life" and "Coldplay Got Eaten By Piranhas")	MHCC
2007	Eartaste Sampler #3 ("Alien Jump Rope Party")	Eartaste
2008	Perceptions 2008 ("The Zaps," "Pass By Palestine" and "Eternal Return")	MHCC
2008	"Plug in Portland" KINK 102 FM Local Music Sampler ("The Zaps")	KINK
2012	Live from the Banana Stand Vol. 1 ("Freeze Tag")	Banana Stand
