= The Shapes We Make =

Studio album by Mary Timony Band
- Released: May 8, 2007
- Length: 46:45
- Label: Kill Rock Stars

Professional ratings
Review scores
Source	Rating
AllMusic	link
Pitchfork	6.6/10 link

The Shapes We Make is the first album from the Mary Timony Band. It was released on May 8, 2007 on Kill Rock Stars. Spin called the album "hit-and-miss."

== Track listing ==
1. "Sharpshooter"
2. "Killed by the Telephone"
3. "Pause/Off"
4. "Summer's Fawn"
5. "Each Day"
6. "Curious Minds"
7. "Pink Clouds"
8. "Window"
9. "Rockman"
10. "New Song"
