= Today's Active Lifestyles =

Studio album by Polvo
- Released: April 19, 1993
- Recorded: December 18–21, 1992
- Genres: Indie rock, progressive rock, lo-fi music
- Length: 41:08
- Label: Merge

Polvo chronology
| Cor-Crane Secret (1992) | Today's Active Lifestyles (1993) | Celebrate the New Dark Age (1994) |

Today's Active Lifestyles is the second album by the American band Polvo, produced by Bob Weston and released on Merge Records on April 19, 1993.

== Music ==
Critics have called Today's Active Lifestyles a math rock album. Music journalist Andrew Earles said the album "brought the band's Middle Eastern influences full circle and experimented more heavily with structure". The album makes use of unorthodox guitar tunings.

== Artwork ==
Early versions of the cover art featured red tigers in the yellow color field, but these were soon removed due to a copyright dispute raised by Jehovah's Witnesses. The band reissued the album in 2020 with cover art featuring nothing but similar red tigers, claiming in an interview that the original was all based on public domain artwork to begin with.

== Release ==
The album was released on Merge Records. "Tilebreaker" was released as a 7-inch single with the song "Chameleon" and the instrumental "Tiara Fetish" on the B-side. ("Tiara Fetish" would later appear, with lyrics, as the song "Watch the Nail" on the Merge compilation 5 Rows of Teeth.)

== Reception ==
Professional ratings
Review scores
| Source | Rating |
|---|---|
| AllMusic | 4.5/5 stars |
| The Great Alternative & Indie Discography | 5/10 |
| Select | 3/5 medals |
| Uncut | 8/10 |

The album went on to receive mostly positive reviews upon release. Tracy Fey of AllMusic called it "an excellent album with many layers." "Never a band to follow formulaic musical styles," she writes, "Polvo once again shakes things up with its twisted song structures of multiple tempos and intricate, distorted guitars." Gerry McGovern of Hot Press gave the album a very positive review, calling it "a massive album. In the sense that it is sprawling, falling, tipping all over the place." He writes that the album sounds the way "Sonic Youth might if Sonic Youth untuned their untuned guitars." CD Review wrote that the album "has all the credentials for a bona fide indie rock classic." Spin wrote that the "refreshingly potent" album sounds more like a "top-notch Glenn Branca spinoff than a college-rock favorite." A mixed review from Select found the album to be derivative of acts like Dinosaur Jr. & Swervedriver, despite noting its "beguiling rhythmic charm".

The Wire included the album on their year-end "Out Rock-Pop" list.

== Legacy ==
Under the Radar called the album a "gift" that "explode[s] your mind with inventive guitar work." Dusted Magazine called it "fresh and off-the-cuff". The album is now described by many as being a "landmark" and a "classic". According to PopMatters, the album along with its follow up "found the best balance between [...] assaulting you with bending notes one moment, and soaring over you with crunching anthems the next." Peter Watts of Uncut reviewed the album's 2020 reissue very positively, and hailed the closing track "Gemini Cusp" as a "lo-fi prog masterpiece."

Treble included the album on their list, "Merge Records: 20 Essential Albums". Similarly, PopMatters included it on "Merge's Silver Age: 25 Essential Albums Over 25 Years".

Music journalist Andrew Earles said the album was an "out-of-nowhere shot in indie rock's arm" and a "game changer".

== Track listing ==
1. "Thermal Treasure" – 4:32
2. "Lazy Comet" – 3:49
3. "My Kimono" – 2:21
4. "Sure Shot" – 3:24
5. "Stinger (Five Wigs)" – 7:23
6. "Tilebreaker" – 4:09
7. "Shiska" – 1:30
8. "Time Isn't on My Side" – 3:06
9. "Action Vs. Vibe" – 3:43
10. "Gemini Cusp" – 7:05

== Personnel ==
- Ash Bowie – vocals, guitar
- Dave Brylawski – guitar, vocals
- Steve Popson – bass guitar
- Eddie Watkins – drums
