= Cul-De-Sacs and Dead Ends =

Studio album by the Minders
- Released: September 7, 1999
- Genre: Indie pop
- Length: 35:11
- Label: spinART

The Minders chronology
Hooray for Tuesday (1998)	Cul-De-Sacs and Dead Ends (1999)	Golden Street (2001)

Professional ratings
Review scores
Source	Rating
AllMusic	4/5 stars
Pitchfork Media	(8.7/10)

Cul-De-Sacs and Dead Ends is a compilation of B-sides and singles by the Minders.

== Track listing ==
No.	Title	Length
1.	"Build"	1:52
2.	"Almost Arms"	1:30
3.	"Chatty Patty"	2:22
4.	"Paper Plane"	3:06
5.	"Sally"	2:04
6.	"Big Machine"	1:50
7.	"Rocket 58"	1:32
8.	"Better Things"	1:33
9.	"Weigh the Anchor"	2:20
10.	"Now I Can Smile"	2:02
11.	"Black Balloon"	1:32
12.	"Hand Me Downs"	2:33
13.	"Bicycle"	2:21
14.	"Step Right Up"	2:21
15.	"As Good as You Are"	2:26
16.	"Waterlooville"	2:18
17.	"Time Vs. Length"	1:29
Total length:		35:11
