= The Golden Dove =

Studio album by Mary Timony
- Released: May 21, 2002
- Label: Matador
- Producer: Mary Timony, Mark Linkous

Mary Timony chronology
Mountains (2000)	The Golden Dove (2002)	Ex Hex (2005)

Professional ratings
Review scores
Source	Rating
AllMusic	4/5 stars
Pitchfork	7.1/10
Stylus Magazine	C

The Golden Dove is the second solo album by Mary Timony. It was released on May 21, 2002, on Matador Records.

== Critical reception ==
AllMusic thought that "The Golden Dove puts the 'independent' back in indie-rock: It's beautiful, weird, and difficult to love." The Washington Post wrote that "the songs jump from poetic fantasies accompanied by British-folk arpeggios to earthy resentments over choppy punk chords." The Chicago Tribune praised the "beguiling instrumental color and gentle lyricism."

In a 2017 Pitchfork feature, musician Sadie Dupuis dubbed Dove "one of the most influential records to me" and called its songs "creepy and sad and surprising." She singled Dove out in particular for exemplifying Timony's "adventurous talent for arrangement".

== Track listing ==
1. "Look a Ghost in the Eye"
2. "The Mirror"
3. "Blood Tree"
4. "Dr. Cat"
5. "The Owl's Escape"
6. "Musik and Charming Melodee"
7. "14 Horses"
8. "Magic Power"
9. "The White Room"
10. "Ant's Dance"
11. "Dryad and the Mule"
12. "Ash and Alice"
