= In Prism =

Studio album by Polvo
- Released: September 8, 2009
- Genres: Indie rock, math rock, progressive rock
- Length: 49:22
- Label: Merge
- Producers: Brian Paulson, Polvo

Polvo chronology
Shapes (1997)	In Prism (2009)	Siberia (2013)

In Prism is Polvo's fifth studio album, and their first since 1997's Shapes. It was recorded by Brian Paulson and was released on Merge Records on September 8, 2009. The track "Beggar's Bowl" was streamed online.

== Reception ==
Professional ratings
Aggregate scores
Source	Rating
Metacritic	79/100
Review scores
Source	Rating
AllMusic	3.5/5 stars
The A.V. Club	B+
The Boston Globe	3.5/4 stars
Filter	74%
Pitchfork	8.1/10
PopMatters	8/10 stars
Spin	7/10 stars
Tiny Mix Tapes	4/5 stars
Under the Radar	6/10 stars

In Prism received a Metacritic score of 79 based on 14 reviews, indicating a generally favorable critical reception. Jason Lymangrover of AllMusic writes: "Polvo's first studio album since 1997's Shapes, 2009's In Prism is a solid return to mathy form. Although 12 years is a long hiatus, it's hardly noticeable that time has passed, with the exception of a few machinery and personnel updates [...] Along with getting mathy and ultra-precise, the band takes the opposite approach and elongates passages, stretching songs into psychedelic space rock territory and surpassing the eight-minute mark on several occasions. As an album, In Prism may not quite live up to the explosiveness of Today's Active Lifestyles -- it's more like the calmer (and produced) Shapes. But even if it's not their best ever, it's a valid comeback that should appease longing fans." Despite a middling score, John Everheart of Under the Radar called it "a sprawling, psychedelic masterwork, rife with knotty tangles of discordance and serpentine riffs." Stuart Berman of Pitchfork wrote: "In Prism could be the first Polvo album where the melodies leave as lasting an impression as the noise around them, with Bowie tapping into a more guileless mode of expression that rarely revealed itself before."

== Track listing ==
1. "Right the Relation" - 5:36
2. "D.C. Trails" - 6:57
3. "Beggar's Bowl" - 5:01
4. "City Birds" - 5:21
5. "Lucia" - 8:15
6. "Dream Residue/Work" - 5:48
7. "The Pedlar" - 3:37
8. "A Link in the Chain" - 8:47

== Personnel ==
Polvo are credited as the primary artists & producers. The remaining credits are adapted from AllMusic:

- Chris Eubank - Cello
- River Guerguerian - Percussion
- Brian Paulson - Engineer, Mixing, Producer
- Alan Douches - Mastering
- Julian Dreyer - Assistant Engineer
- Michael Klayman - Photography
- Ashley Worley - Photography
- Gordon Zacharias - Photography
