= Exploded Drawing =

1996 album by Polvo

Studio album by Polvo
- Released: 1996
- Recorded: October 1995
- Genre: Indie rock
- Length: 58:48
- Label: Touch and Go

Polvo chronology
| This Eclipse (1995) | Exploded Drawing (1996) | Shapes (1997) |

Exploded Drawing is the third studio album by the rock band Polvo. It was released in 1996 as a CD and double-LP on Touch and Go Records. The album was engineered by Bob Weston.

== Reception ==
Professional ratings
Review scores
| Source | Rating |
|---|---|
| AllMusic | 3.5/5 stars |
| The Boston Phoenix | 3/4 stars |
| Entertainment Weekly | B |
| The Great Alternative & Indie Discography | 5/10 |
| NME | 6/10 |

Heather Phares of AllMusic called the album "a sonic journey that encompasses nearly every kind of sound that a guitar has been known to make, and a few that might be unheard of until now." She notes the incorporation of "blues, Eastern music, folk, country, and ambient music" into the album's sound "giving each song a twisting, unpredictable quality", despite criticizing its length. According to Entertainment Weekly's Ethan Smith, "despite Polvo’s ongoing virtuosic use of alternative tunings and time signatures, Exploded Drawing disappoints in one major way: The lyrics — now more audible than on previous releases — are not nearly as interesting as the music deserves." Peter Margasak of the Chicago Reader writes that the "foursome has discovered a glimmering netherworld at the intersection of alternate tuning, pop hooks, and off-kilter rhythms" on this album. He continued that despite "still [operating] around the noise/melody axis much like Sonic Youth, the stylistic shadows of that influence seem to be receding." In the 23rd issue of Ox-Fanzine published in 1996, Thomas Kerpen wrote that the album "is damn close" to being a "masterpiece" and that it "should have catapulted indie rock into the next decade."

James Oldham of NME gave the album a mixed review, with most of the review itself focusing negatively on the American alternative rock scene of the 90s from which this album emerged, particularly lo-fi music and slacker culture. He criticized its "fiendish pointlessness" and "utterly indulgent riffery [sic]", despite comparing "the delightfully meandering 'High-Wire Moves'" positively to Pavement.

== Legacy ==
In 1999, Pitchfork ranked it at No. 68 on their original "Top 100 Favorite Records of the 1990s" list, though it was later excluded from the updated version published in 2003.

In the years following the band's reunion, the album has been viewed in a much more positive light, and has often been called their best. The Line of Best Fit called it a "sprawling double album [that] expanded the band’s sound from the surgically-focused twin guitar assaults to psych, folk, hardcore and all points in between. It felt like an ambitious mission statement from a group not content to simply dole out the riffs to anyone who wanted them". A Treble review of In Prism found it to "bear the same skill and adventurousness" of this album. Pitchfork called the "epic double-album statement" the band's "critical peak [...] which saw them successfully unraveling their bee-swarm guitar buzz to explore the polarities of their sound, from psychedelic-folk lullabies to brutalizing post-hardcore." In a retrospective article on the band's discography, Louder Than War hailed the album as Polvo's best & a "masterpiece" which "represents its namesake in every single way." In his book Gimme Indie Rock, Andrew Earles opined that Exploded Drawing "should be put in a rocket or a time capsule as the ultimate proof that indie rock could reach perfection, years into the game, while being so ahead of its time that future generations are still trying to catch up."

== Track listing ==
1. "Fast Canoe" – 6:41
2. "Bridesmaid Blues" – 3:30
3. "Feather of Forgiveness" – 3:45
4. "Passive Attack" – 1:12
5. "Light of the Moon" – 2:12
6. "Crumbling Down" – 3:06
7. "Street Knowledge" – 1:51
8. "High-Wire Moves" – 4:21
9. "Monoloth" – 2:52
10. "In This Life" – 4:05
11. "The Secret's Secret" – 2:03
12. "Snowstorm in Iowa" – 2:23
13. "The Purple Bear" – 3:27
14. "Taste of Your Mind" – 3:50
15. "Missing Receipts" – 1:47
16. "When Will You Die for the Last Time in My Dreams" – 11:43

== Personnel ==
- Ash Bowie – vocals, guitar
- Dave Brylawski – vocals, guitar
- Steve Popson – bass
- Eddie Watkins – drums
