= Cor-Crane Secret =

Studio album by Polvo
- Released: 1992
- Recorded: January 2–5, 1992
- Genres: Indie rock, noise rock, math rock
- Length: 38:24
- Label: Merge

Polvo chronology
Cor-Crane Secret (1992)	Today's Active Lifestyles (1993)

Cor-Crane Secret is the debut studio album by North Carolina indie rock band Polvo. It was recorded at Duck Kee Studios in Raleigh, North Carolina, and released on Merge Records in 1992.

== Singles ==
Different versions of "Can I Ride" and "Vibracobra" appeared on the band's first two 7-inch releases in 1991. Another version of "In the Hand, In the Sieve" appeared on the band's split 7-inch EP with Erectus Monotone.

== Reception ==
Professional ratings
Review scores
Source	Rating
AllMusic	3/5 stars
The Boston Phoenix	2.5/4 stars
The Great Alternative & Indie Discography	6/10
Select	3/5 medals
Uncut	7/10

According to Jason Anderson of AllMusic, the "critically embraced" debut of the band "deserves notice for its scope and imaginative guitars. However, Cor-Crane Secret sounds brittle when compared to the work of more accomplished '90s guitar bands like Built to Spill, Pavement, and Sonic Youth." He notes the "band's tendency to meander through long patches of dissonant but artful guitar structures [that] vigorously challenges the average rock attention span" and that they "dare themselves into overpowering their own rich songwriting" on the album. According to David Sprague of Trouser Press, the band's "lengthy, enigmatic songs have far more in common with Gentle Giant and ELP (on a budget, of course) than anything contemporary, and its disavowal of hooks is all but complete" on their debut album which "quickly laid down the clinical gauntlet", criticizing Bowie's "unsteady" vocals. Select gave the album a similarly mixed review, with critic Anrew Perry writing that it was "[s]tructurally one of the weirdest, most contorted rock LPs of the year" and a "unique aural experience" despite the lack of "singalong choruses".

A retrospective piece on the album published by Tiny Mix Tapes finds it "filled with ideas. We hear guitars played like sitars (“Ox Scapula”), rubber bands (“Bend or Break”), and theremins (“The Curtain Remembers”)." It also lists a large number of influences spread across its tracks, despite noting that "all of these seemingly incongruent elements form something remarkably coherent", ending the piece by calling it "years ahead of most rock music coming out today." According to The A.V. Club, the album "set a standard for post-Sonic Youth art-rock that few bands (outside of Polvo itself) could top." Upon being reissued with Today's Active Lifestyles in 2020, Jon Dolan wrote an article for Rolling Stone on the song "Channel Changer", describing it as "a love song, albeit a strange one. Singer-guitarist Ash Bowie mumbles about wanting you to hang around his place so bad he’ll even go get the channel changer off the stereo and pick it up and put on your favorite show: “I’ll promise to watch if it if you promise not to go,” [sic] he sings, sounding at once dreamy and needy as the music slides around and chugs and twists and takes off and the guitars distractedly buzz like stoned mosquitoes." "What emerges" he continues, "is a vague-yet-vérité version of relationship ambiguity that feels at once weird and true, embodying the world of a band whose songs always seemed to be beautifully coming and going at the same time, slipping into something and out of something else (as the Feelies once sang), making indecision feel idealistic."

== In popular culture ==
A different take of the song "Can I Ride" released the year before on a 7-inch single was featured, alongside the band, on the film Half-Cocked.

== Track listing ==
1. "Vibracobra" - 4:47
2. "Kalgon" - 2:02
3. "Bend or Break" - 5:24
4. "Can I Ride" - 3:44
5. "Sense of It" - 2:35
6. "Ox Scapula" - 1:41
7. "Channel Changer" - 4:28
8. "In the Hand, in the Sieve" - 2:32
9. "The Curtain Remembers" - 3:25
10. "Well Is Deep" - 4:41
11. "Duped" - 2:57

== Personnel ==
- Ash Bowie – vocals, guitar
- Dave Brylawski – vocals, guitar
- Steve Popson – bass
- Eddie Watkins – drums
