= It's Real (Ex Hex album) =

Studio album by Ex Hex
- Released: March 22, 2019
- Genre: Garage rock
- Length: 39:15
- Label: Merge
- Producer: Jonah Takagi

Ex Hex chronology
| Rips (2014) | It's Real (2019) |

Professional ratings
Aggregate scores
| Source | Rating |
|---|---|
| AnyDecentMusic? | 7.4/10 |
| Metacritic | 77/100 |
Review scores
| Source | Rating |
| AllMusic | 4/5 stars |
| Exclaim! | 7/10 |
| Financial Times | 4/5 stars |
| Mojo | 4/5 stars |
| NME | 4/5 stars |
| The Observer | 3/5 stars |
| Pitchfork | 7.8/10 |
| Q | 3/5 stars |
| Rolling Stone | 4/5 stars |
| Uncut | 8/10 |

It's Real is the second studio album by American band Ex Hex. It was released on March 22, 2019, through Merge Records.

== Track listing ==
| No. | Title | Length |
|---|---|---|
| 1. | "Tough Enough" | 4:39 |
| 2. | "Rainbow Shiner" | 3:35 |
| 3. | "Good Times" | 2:54 |
| 4. | "Want It to Be True" | 5:14 |
| 5. | "Diamond Drive" | 3:42 |
| 6. | "No Reflection" | 3:29 |
| 7. | "Another Dimension" | 5:31 |
| 8. | "Cosmic Cave" | 3:00 |
| 9. | "Radiate" | 3:53 |
| 10. | "Talk to Me" | 3:18 |
| Total length: | | 39:15 |
