= Ex Hex (band) =

American rock band

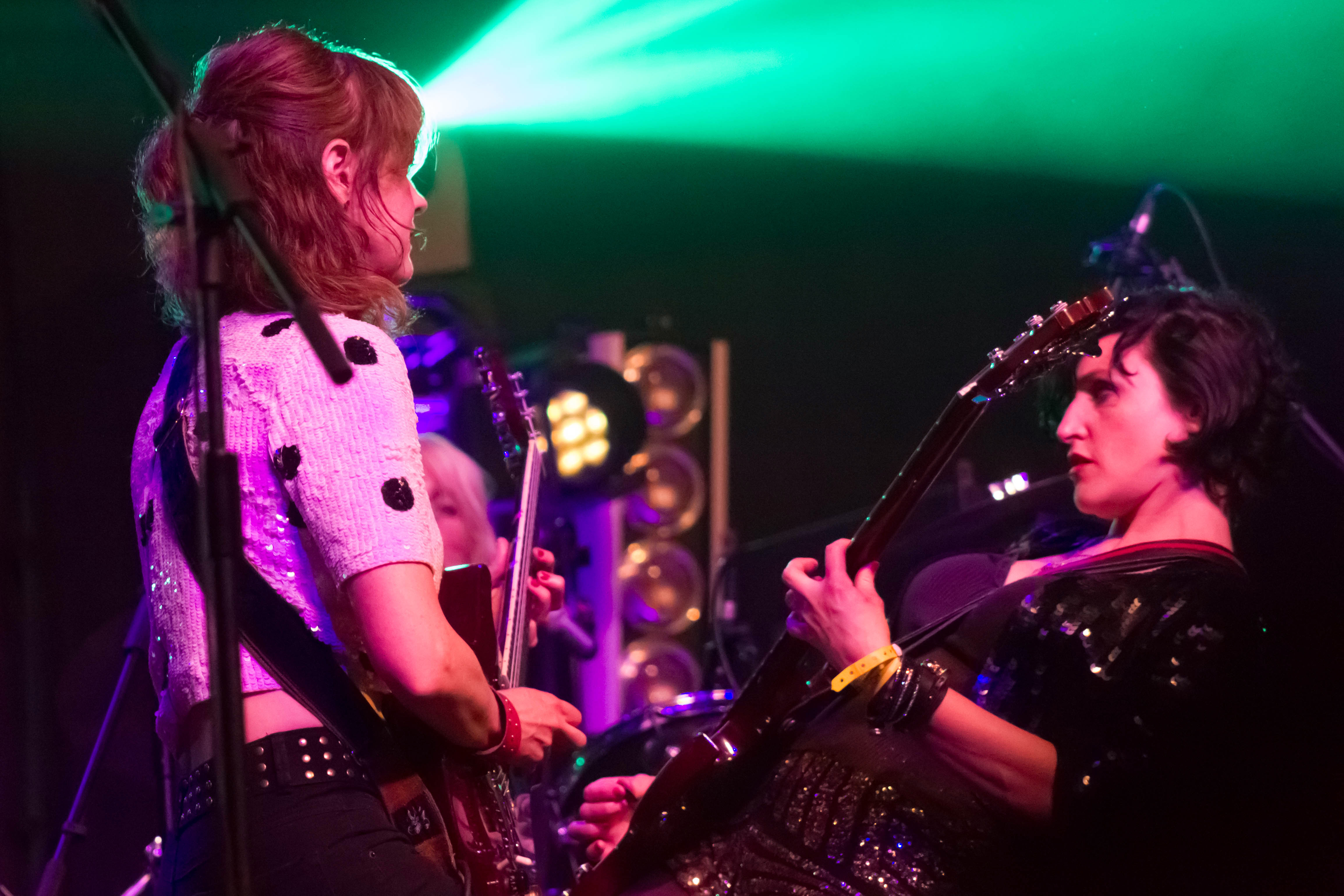

Background information
- Origin: Washington, D.C., U.S.
- Genres: Indie rock; garage rock; garage punk; rock and roll
- Years active: 2013-present
- Label: Merge
- Members: Mary Timony; Betsy Wright; Laura Harris

Ex Hex is an American rock band formed in 2013. The band consists of Mary Timony, Betsy Wright and Laura Harris. Ex Hex recorded their first single, "Hot and Cold" in Timony's basement, then went on to record Rips, with Mitch Easter and Jonah Takagi. On October 7, 2014, the album debuted on Merge Records. They toured extensively, performing with Speedy Ortiz, King Tuff, Rocket from the Crypt, and The Jacuzzi Boys, among others. Ex Hex performed at Coachella Festival in the summer of 2016.

On January 9, 2019, the band announced their second album, It's Real, released on March 22, 2019, on Merge Records.

== Discography ==
Albums

- Rips (2014)
- It's Real (2019)

Singles

- "Hot and Cold" 7" (2014)
