= River Guerguerian =

American composer and musician

River Guerguerian is a multi-percussionist, composer, and educator. Canadian-born, River is of Armenian-Egyptian descent and currently lives in Asheville, North Carolina.

== Education ==
In 1989, Guerguerian received his Bachelor of Music from the Manhattan School of Music conservatory and graduated with the school's award for Most Outstanding Percussionist.

== Music Career and Affiliations ==
River Guerguerian's music has evolved through explorations of indigenous instruments, and their trance-inducing effect, gathered from travels around the planet. His compositions have been commissioned and performed by chamber ensembles, universities, modern dance companies, and new music festivals.

As a studio musician, he has recorded on over 250 albums and film soundtracks. Guerguerian records with musicians of all genres and can be found playing Drumset, Middle Eastern and Afro-Cuban percussion, Frame Drums, Marimba, Tabla, Kanjira, Cajon, Gongs, Singing Bowls, Loopers, and various found objects. He also records percussion tracks for artists at his own recording studio.

Between 1988 and 1993, River created works with Grammy- and Oscar-winning composer Tan Dun.

A respected music educator, he conducts rhythm and sound exploration workshops, and enjoys teaching privately. He is also the music director of the Creative Technology and Arts Center hosted by the Odyssey Community School in Asheville.

River currently travels internationally with Turkish master musician Omar Faruk Tekbilek and drives his world jazz trio Free Planet Radio since 2001.

Guerguerian has performed and/or recorded with such groups as the BBC Symphony Orchestra, New Music Consort, Tibetan Singing Bowl Ensemble, Paul Winter Consort, Talujon Percussion Ensemble, Chuck Berry, Sophie B. Hawkins, and Ziggy Marley/Gipsy Kings. River also performed in the John Cage documentary film, "I Have Nothing to Say and I Am Saying It".

Throughout his 30+ year career, River has performed in concert halls in Tokyo, Moscow, Rome, Berlin, Hong Kong, Barcelona, Athens, Istanbul, London, including Carnegie Hall, Sydney Opera House, and Lincoln Center.

== Off the Grid ==
In 1994, River sold all possessions, left civilization for five years, and lived in the Binsar Wildlife Sanctuary in the Himalaya Mountains, where his first daughter, Amba, was born in 1996. New influences initiated intense research and experimentation into the physiological effects of sound on the body and brainwave states.

== Major works ==
Trance – River Guerguerian (2002)

New Bedouin Dance – Free Planet Radio (2004)

Tibetan Bowl Meditation – River Guerguerian for The Relaxation Company/Sounds True (2006)

The Unraveling – Free Planet Radio (2008)

Grooves for Odd Times – River Guerguerian (2012)

Global Americana – The Billy Sea (2013)

Global Symphony Project – Free Planet Radio (2015)

Stillness – Free Planet Radio (2018)
