= The Shaky Hands =

- Origin: Portland, Oregon, US
- Genres: Indie rock, folk rock, jangle pop
- Years active: 2003–2011
- Labels: Holocene Music, Memphis Industries, Kill Rock Stars
- Members: Nicholas Delffs; Jeff Lehman; Alex Arrowsmith; Mike Yun; Justin Power
- Past members: Paul Culp; Colin Anderson; Nathan Delffs; Jake Morris; Mayhaw Hoons
- Website: myspace.com/shakyhands

The Shaky Hands were a Portland, Oregon-based rock group, formed in 2003 by musician Paul Culp (Lonesome Radio Heart, Culpepper), and Colin Anderson. Nicholas Delffs joined soon after on vocals and guitar. They spent the next three years gradually building a following in the Portland area and self-releasing two CDs, one informally called The Skidmore Days, which is a lo-fi full-length album recorded in future guitarist Jeff Lehman's North Portland basement and mixed by Alex Arrowsmith. They also released a self-titled EP informally referred to as the Bonnie Doon EP, in reference to the location it was recorded. The Shaky Hands were signed to Holocene Music in late 2006. By this time, the lineup had changed considerably, with Mayhaw Hoons replacing Culp (who left in late 2004) on bass and the addition of second guitarist Jeff Lehman. Nathan Delffs (Nicholas' brother, and member of the Castanets) joined shortly thereafter on percussion and lap steel. Their sound is a fusion of 1960s-style British Invasion bands such as the Kinks, the Who and the Zombies and American folk-rock in the vein of Neil Young. The result is what many have described as a loose, jangly, rootsy style of indie rock. The Delffs brothers (along with most of the members of Shaky Hands) also perform Shaky Hands songs (alongside original compositions) under the Death Songs moniker, a more experimental and folk-oriented side project.

In March 2007, Pitchfork Media reviewed their song "Whales Sing" from their forthcoming debut album, out April 10 on Holocene Music. On April 5 of the same year, Holocene Music posted the video for "Why And How Come", directed by Whitey McConnaughy, on YouTube.com.

The band signed to UK independent label Memphis Industries in the summer of 2007, just as they began recording their second album, Lunglight. They released the eponymous debut in the UK & Continental Europe on November 26, 2007. In 2008, The Shaky Hands signed to Kill Rock Stars, which released Lunglight in conjunction with Holocene Music on September 9, 2008, two months after founding member Colin Anderson left the group. Multi-instrumentalist Nathan Delffs took Anderson's place on the drums for the rest of 2008 before Jake Morris of the Joggers took up the position on a permanent basis, beginning with their winter 2009 tour opening for the Meat Puppets.

After spending much of 2009 on tour, Morris left the group in February 2010. Delffs moved to the drums in Morris' absence and recruited Portland artist Alex Arrowsmith for keyboards and guitars. After recording a new record, Realms Out Of Reach, in summer 2010, Mayhaw Hoons left the group and Arrowsmith moved to bass. Mike Yun was brought in on keyboards and guitar, along with Justin Power on additional percussion and backing vocals. The group disbanded in 2011 without releasing Realms Out of Reach.

== Mayhaw Hoons ==
Mayhaw Hoons
- Born: June 22, 1982 (age 43); Hood River, Oregon, US
- Origin: Portland, Oregon, US
- Genres: Alternative rock, indie rock
- Occupation: Musician
- Instruments: Bass guitar, vocals
- Years active: 2007–present
- Labels: Holocene Records, Kill Rock Stars
- Formerly of: The Shaky Hands, [Mondo Hollywood

Mayhaw Hoons (born June 22, 1982) is the bassist for the Shaky Hands, who he has performed and recorded with since 2004. He has self-released several solo albums produced by Portland musician and friend Alex Arrowsmith (on whose records he has also made appearances). Hoons also fronts the on-again-off-again Portland garage-funk band Mondo Hollywood as the singer and principal songwriter. He was the bass player and backing vocalist for The Shaky Hands from 2004 until his departure in summer 2010.

== Discography ==
=== Studio albums ===
Year	Title	Label
2004	The Skidmore Days	Self-released
2007	The Shaky Hands	Holocene Music
2008	Lunglight	Kill Rock Stars/Holocene Music
2009	Let It Die	Kill Rock Stars

=== EPs ===
Year	Title	Label
2005	The Shaky Hands	Self-released
2008	Break The Spell	Kill Rock Stars/Holocene Music
