= The Joggers =

American rock band

- Origin: Portland, Oregon, USA
- Genres: Indie rock Alternative rock
- Years active: 2001–present
- Labels: Startime International, TLA, Flameshovel
- Members: Darrell Bourque; Jake Morris; Ben Whitesides; Dan Wilson
- Past members: Murphy Kasiewicz

The Joggers, formerly known as Stateside, are a four-piece band from Portland, Oregon. They play complex songs with elements of math rock which retain a pop sensibility. The guitar style of (lead singer and songwriter) Ben Whitesides and the second guitarist rejects a traditional rhythm & lead style for more scale exploration and includes elements of call and response. Murphy Kasiewicz played second guitar on Solid Guild, but left the band before the recording of With A Cape And A Cane and was replaced by Dan Wilson (from Alaska) after that album, touring the US in support of it. Jake Morris has also played drums on tour with French Kicks and played drums for The Shaky Hands from December 2008 to March 2010. All members sing parts at various times, with unique and sometimes antique harmonies, and sometimes play various instruments. Ben Whitesides is the son of George M. Whitesides, one of the most decorated chemists in the world.

The original members are mostly former New Englanders, and after meeting in Portland formed a band in 2000 under the name Stateside and released one self-titled EP. After a name-conflict with another Stateside they changed their name. In 2002 they released the eight-song self-titled EP The Joggers (also called "The Birds" because of its cover) on TLA Records. From that EP, the song "Devil Wears Earplugs" appeared on Supercuts, the compilation from Startime International, who signed the band. Three other songs from the Joggers debut EP appeared on their proper debut album, 2003's critically acclaimed Solid Guild. 2005 saw the release of "With a Cape and a Cane", which brought even more critical if not commercial success.

Ben and Darrell also make up the Cajun Gems, who have one self-released album with a more folkier sound than the Joggers. Dan has been recently playing with the Cajun Gems as well.
