= The Minders =

American band

- Origin: Denver, Colorado, US
- Genres: Jangle pop; indie rock
- Years active: 1996–2008; 2011–present
- Labels: spinART; Future Farmer; Space Cassette; Low Transit Industries
- Members: Martyn Leaper; Karen Page; Alex Arrowsmith; Jeff Lehman; Mike Wyant
- Past members: Rebecca Cole; Joanna Bolme; Rachel Blumberg

The Minders are an American band closely associated with the Elephant Six Collective. Started by Martyn Leaper in Denver, Colorado, in 1996, the band's original members included Leaper on guitars and vocals, Rebecca Cole on drums, Jeff Almond on guitar, and Marc Willhite on bass.

Leaper formed the Minders in Denver along with Robert Schneider and Hilarie Sidney from the Apples in Stereo. Together they recorded Paper Plane EP in Athens, Georgia. Leaper recorded the "Come On & Hear" 7-inch record in Denver, Colorado, allegedly one of the fastest selling Elephant 6 releases in history. At this time, Leaper began attempting to form a more permanent band after releasing "Paper Plane" on 7".

With a permanent lineup set, the band was able to release Rocket 58 as an EP and sign to spinART Records, who released their first album Hooray for Tuesday in 1998. Touring and the release of some other singles ensued, and the band split, with Leaper and Cole moving from Denver to Portland, Oregon, and recruiting future Jicks bassist Joanna Bolme. The minor upheaval resulted in the eventual release of Cul-De-Sacs and Dead Ends, a compilation of singles and b-sides.

Bolme left the Minders shortly after the release of the band's second proper album, Golden Street, in 2001. Almond and Willhite regrouped with the band in time to release their third album in 2002, The Future's Always Perfect.

In the spring of 2008, Cole left the band.

The Minders released Into the River on Space Cassette in 2016, followed by Psychedelic Blacktop in 2022.

== Discography ==
The Minders have released their albums on spinART, but have also released a number of EPs and singles on a variety of record labels.

=== Albums ===
- Hooray for Tuesday - spinART - 1998
- Cul-De-Sacs and Dead Ends - spinART - 1999
- Golden Street - spinART - 2001
- The Future's Always Perfect - Future Farmer - 2003
- The Stolen Boy - self-released tour-only CD - 2004
- It's a Bright Guilty World - Future Farmer - 2006
- Cul-De-Sacs and Dead Ends vol 2 - Dirigeable Recordings - 2012
- Into the River - Space Cassette - 2016
- Psychedelic Blacktop - Space Cassette - 2022

=== Singles and EPs ===
- "Come On & Hear" (7") - Elephant 6 - 1996
- "Paper Plane" (7") - Elephant 6 - 1996
- "Rocket 58" (7") - 100 Guitar Mania - 1997
- "Black Balloon" (7") - Little Army - 1998
- "Right As Rain" (7") - Earworm - 1999
- Down in Fall (CD) - spinART - 2000
- Split w/ Tobin Sprout (7") - Sprite Recordings - 2002
- "Live at KPSU" (7") - Dirigeable Records - 2002
- "Tearaway" (7") - Omnibus Records - 2003
- Split w/ The Zebras (7") - Low Transit Industries - 2003
- "It's Going To Break Out" (7"/Digital Download) - Dirigeable / Space Cassette - 2013
