= Tape Op =

US magazine

- Editor: Larry Crane
- Categories: Music
- Frequency: Bimonthly
- Founded: 1996
- Country: United States
- Based in: Portland, Oregon
- Language: English
- Website: http://www.tapeop.com

Tape Op is a bi-monthly American recording magazine that focuses on creative recording techniques. Subtitled The Creative Music Recording Magazine, Tape Op is independently published and was founded by Larry Crane in 1996. The magazine is based in Portland, Oregon.

Tape Op also runs a message board commonly referred to as the "TOMB" ("Tape Op Message Board").

== History ==
Tape Op was initiated as a zine in 1996. The first magazines were published by photocopying, hand-stapling and spray painting the covers. In 1999, Crane added John Baccigaluppi, who assumed publishing duties and also served as Graphic Design Director. In 2004, the magazine expanded (under the business name Tape Op Magazine Limited) into the UK and Continental Europe, when publishers Alexander Lawson and Nadia Osta assumed publishing duties.

== Management ==
Tape Op is mainly a volunteer effort, with a majority of the writers working in full or part-time engineering positions. Contributors include: Scott Evans, Garrett Haines, Mike Jasper, Scott McChane (Assistant Gear Reviews Editor), Neil Mclellan, F. Reid Shippen, Kirt Shearer, Brian T. Silak, Steve Silverstein, Thom Monahan, Joel Hamilton, Andy Hong (Gear Reviews Editor), Alex Maiolo, Richard Barone, Dana Gumbiner and Pete Weiss.

== Conventions ==
For a period from 2003 to 2008 Tape Op held Annual Conventions.

== Other publications ==
Tape Op published 2 books.

- Tape Op: The Book About Creative Music Recording (2001)
- Tape Op: The Book About Creative Music Recording Vol. 2 (2010)
