= Rebecca Cole (musician) =

American keyboardist

Rebecca Clay Cole is an American musician who has played the keyboards in Wild Flag and the drums in the Minders. She is a touring member of Pavement, playing keyboards during their 2022–2023 reunion tour, and again in 2026.

Regarding her role in Pavement's 2022–2023 reunion tour, the band's Bob Nastanovich noted: "[She] makes us better than ever, allowing us to play so many songs better than ever and also play 10–12 songs we’ve never played before. She makes us more versatile."
