= Mary Timony =

American musician

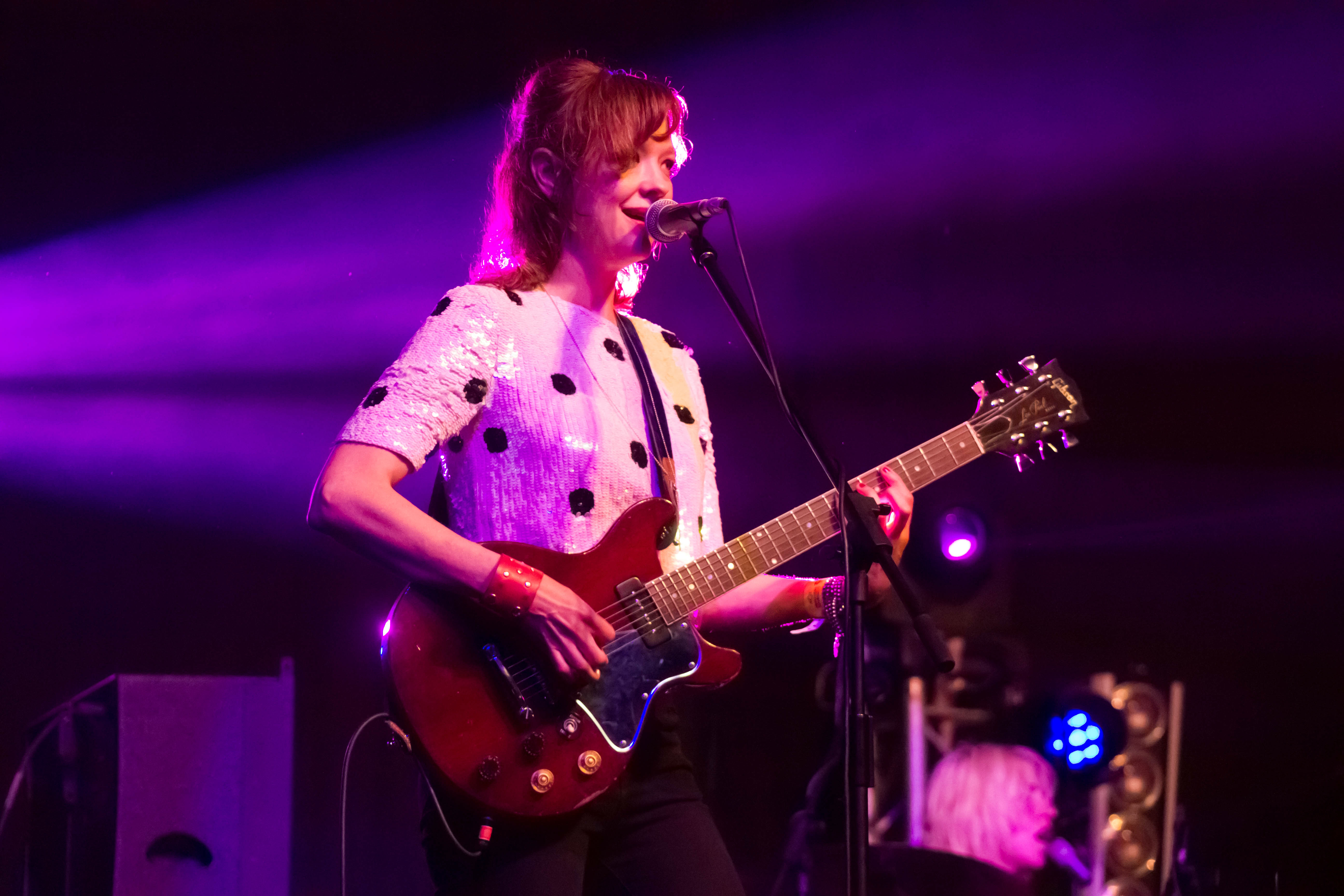
- Timony in 2015

Background information
- Born: Washington, D.C., United States
- Genres: Noise pop; post-punk; indie rock
- Instruments: Vocals, guitar, keyboards, bass guitar, viola
- Years active: 1990–present

Mary Bozana Timony (born 1969 or 1970) is an American independent singer-songwriter, guitarist, keyboardist, bassist, and violist. She has been a member of the bands Helium, Autoclave, Wild Flag, and Hammered Hulls, and currently fronts Ex Hex.

Timony's music is often heavy and dark, frequently using drones, beats, and modal melodies reminiscent of European Medieval music. She uses a number of alternate guitar tunings, most prominent of which is DADGAE. Timony's influences include Wire, the Slits, Fugazi, and Television.

Her unique style has been cited as an influence amongst musicians such as Carrie Brownstein of Sleater-Kinney, Sadie Dupuis of Speedy Ortiz and many more. Rolling Stone ranked Timony at number 95 on their 2023 list of the 250 greatest guitarists of all time.

== Biography ==
Timony was born to James and Joan Timony of Washington, D.C., and raised in the neighborhoods of Glover Park and Wesley Heights. She has Czech ancestry (at least one grandmother, whose name Božana is the reason behind Timony's middle name). As a teenager, she attended the Duke Ellington School of the Arts in Georgetown where she played guitar in the jazz band and also studied viola. Her guitar teacher Tom Newman recalled to interviewers: “She came to us a prodigy. You can’t teach what she has.”

In 1990–91 Timony played guitar and shared lead vocals in the Washington, D.C.-based band Autoclave. She later relocated to Boston, where she graduated from Boston University with a degree in English literature and formed the band Helium in the summer of 1992, recording two albums and three EPs with the group between 1994 and 1997. During this same period, Timony also collaborated with Helium bassist Ash Bowie in the short-lived side project Led Byrd, which contributed tracks to several various-artists compilations.

Helium disbanded in 1998, whereupon Timony moved back to Washington, DC and embarked on her solo career, recording albums in 2000 and 2002 (Mountains and The Golden Dove). She joined with drummer Devin Ocampo for her third solo album Ex Hex, which was released in 2005 on the Lookout! Records label and features the two performing together as a duo. In the same year, she contributed vocals to Team Sleep's self-titled album on the tracks "Tomb of Liegia" and "King Diamond."

She released a fourth solo album, The Shapes We Make, on the Kill Rock Stars label on May 8, 2007. A music video for "Sharp Shooter" was produced by the art collective Paper Rad.

In early 2009, Mary Timony formed a new band, Pow Wow, with Jonah R. Takagi and Winston H. Yu. As of June 2009 the group added T. J. Lipple and changed its name to Soft Power.

In September 2010, Mary Timony and members of Sleater-Kinney, The Minders, and Quasi announced that they were working on a new album under the moniker Wild Flag. It was released on Merge Records on September 13, 2011.

After Wild Flag's breakup, Timony formed Ex Hex with Fire Tapes bassist Betsy Wright, and The Aquarium drummer Laura Harris. Their debut album Rips was released on Merge Records in October 2014. Her former bandmate Jonah Takagi produced both Rips and the group's sophomore effort, It's Real (released in March 2019 on Merge Records).

Since 2018, she has been a member of the Washington, D.C.-based band Hammered Hulls, playing bass.

Her latest solo album, Untame the Tiger, was released by Merge in February 2024.

Her brother, Patrick Timony, is the keyboard player for the band the Picture is Dead.

There is a reference to Mary Timony in the lyrics to the song "Your Bruise" by the American indie rock band Death Cab for Cutie, from their 1998 debut album Something About Airplanes.

== Side projects ==
In addition to her work with Autoclave, Helium, and the Mary Timony Band, Timony has occasionally collaborated or recorded with other groups. In 1999, Timony recorded a four-song vinyl EP with Carrie Brownstein of the band Sleater-Kinney, in a duo called The Spells. In 2000, she recorded a six-song CD with Anna Johansson and Erin Maclean, entitled Green 4.

In 1995, Timony recorded the song "All Dressed Up In Dreams" with Stephin Merritt, on the 6ths album Wasps' Nests. She also recorded vocals for a one-off alt-country project called Lincoln '65. This project's sole output was a 7" single released by Slow River Records in 1996, labeled simply Lincoln '65, and contained two tracks, "Dreams" and "Jellyfish".

Timony collaborated with Team Sleep on "Tomb of Liegia" and "King Diamond" on their 2005 self-titled album, and "Let's Go" from the Deluxe Edition release of the album in 2024. In 2007 she recorded an album with Garland of Hours, a group that features cellist Amy Domingues.

== Filmography ==
Year	Title	Role	Notes
1997	All Over Me	Band Member (Coochie Pop)	
2000	Dream Machine	Trixie	
2016	What Is a Group?	Electric Guitarist (Chain & the Gang)	

== Discography ==
=== Solo ===
- Mountains (Matador, 2000)
- The Golden Dove (Matador, 2002)
- Ex Hex (Lookout!, 2005)
- Untame the Tiger (Merge, 2024)

=== Mary Timony Band ===
- The Shapes We Make (Kill Rock Stars, 2007)

=== Mind Science of the Mind ===
- Mind Science of the Mind (Epic, 1996)

=== Led Byrd ===
- "The Dragon #1" appears on the compilation Extra Walt! (Walt, 1996)
- "Fantastic Castle" appears on the compilation EP Stargirl (Villa Villakula, 1996)

=== Lincoln '65 ===
- "Dreams" b/w "Jellyfish" 7" single (Slow River, 1996)

=== The Spells ===
- The Age of Backwards EP (K, 1999)
- Bat Vs. Bird EP (self-released, 2008)

=== Green 4 ===
- Green 4 (limited edition CD-R, 2000)

=== Garland of Hours ===
- The Soundest Serum (Noble Task Records, 2007)
- Lucidia (Noble Task Records, 2012)

=== Hammered Hulls ===
- Hammered Hulls EP (Dischord, 2019)
- Careening (Dischord, 2022)
