= Polvo =

American indie rock band

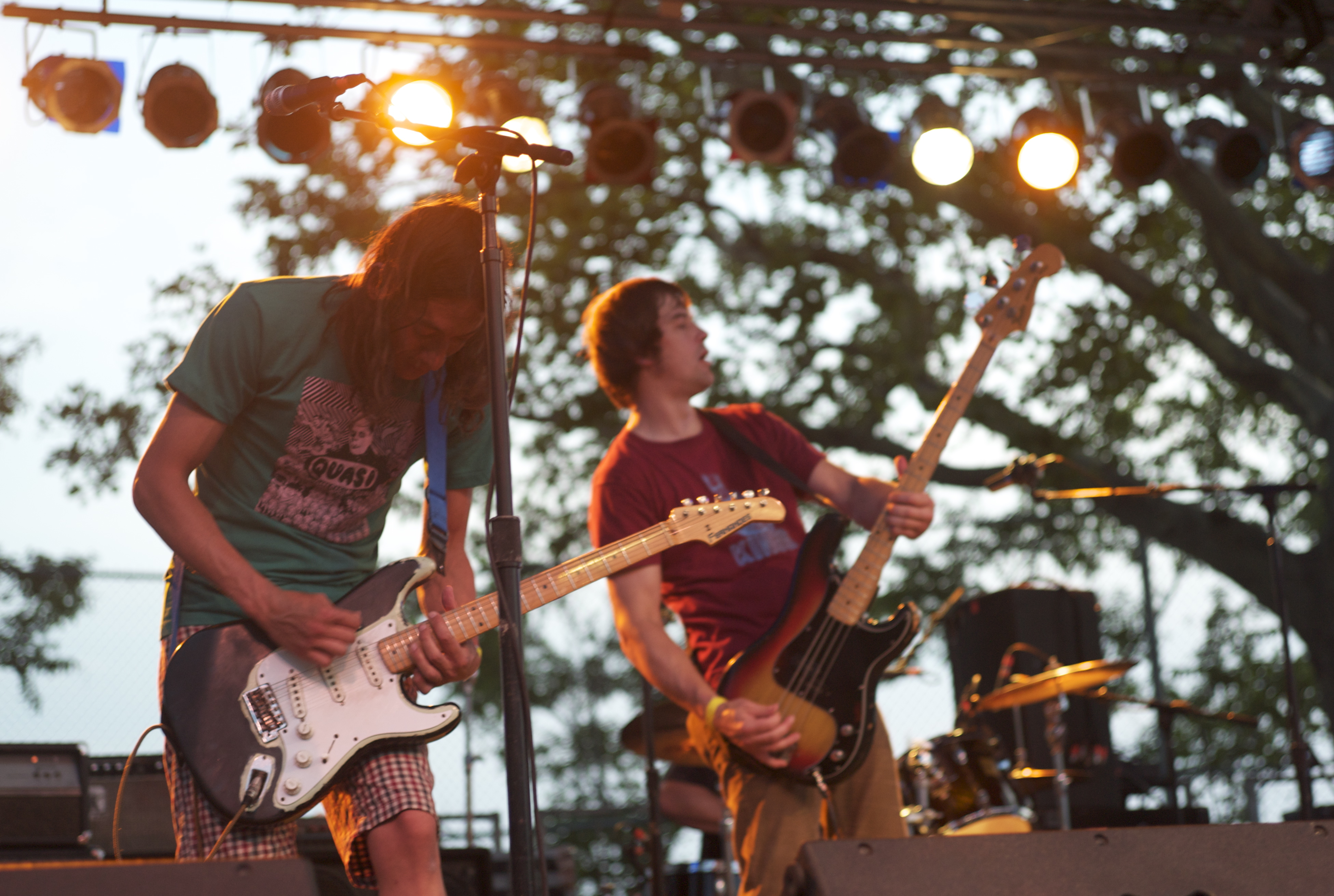
- Polvo performing live in Greenpoint, New York, in 2010

Background information
- Origin: Chapel Hill, North Carolina, U.S.
- Genres: Indie rock; noise rock; math rock; post-hardcore; post-rock
- Years active: 1990–1998; 2008–present
- Labels: Merge; Touch And Go
- Members: Ash Bowie; Dave Brylawski; Steve Popson; Brian Quast
- Past members: Eddie Watkins; Brian Walsby
- Website: polvonc.bandcamp.com

Polvo is an American indie rock band from Chapel Hill, North Carolina, formed in 1990. They are known for their intricate musical style which is characterized by the use of dissonant, layered guitars; off-kilter rhythms, and unorthodox yet melodic song structures. The band has since been described as one of the most accomplished acts within the math rock genre, and their distinctive sound is what set them apart from contemporaries at the time.

Polvo’s lineup consists of frontmen Ash Bowie and Dave Brylawski, both on vocal and guitar duties respectively, Steve Popson on bass, and Brian Quast on drums. Eddie Watkins, the band’s original drummer, did not rejoin the lineup upon their 2008 reformation after initially disbanding in 1998.

== Biography ==
=== Formation and early releases ===
Polvo formed in 1990 in Chapel Hill, North Carolina, United States. Their original lineup consisted of vocalists/guitarists Ash Bowie and Dave Brylawski, bassist Steve Popson, and drummer Eddie Watkins. Bowie and Brylawski met in a Spanish class at the University of North Carolina and shared an affinity for music released by SST Records and local rock band Let's Active. Polvo's first recording was Can I Ride, a double 7-inch single released on the band's Kitchen Puff Records label in 1991. It was later re-released on CD as the Polvo EP on micro-indie Jesus Christ Records. The band then released two full-length albums, two EPs, and several 7-inches on Merge Records, a label run by Superchunk's Mac McCaughan, a high-school classmate of Brylawski and Popson. Merge Records issued their debut album, Cor-Crane Secret, in 1992. Today's Active Lifestyles followed in 1993, refining the group's approach, and it was followed in turn by two EPs, 1994's Celebrate the New Dark Age and 1995's This Eclipse. Today's Active Lifestyles was later reissued with an alternative cover without the lion image on it, because of a copyright lawsuit brought by the painter of the album.

The band also made an appearance in the 1994 cult road movie Half-Cocked.

=== Wider reach, dispersion and break-up ===
Polvo toured North America numerous times, including outings with Thinking Fellers Union Local 282, Pavement, Superchunk, Pipe, Sonic Youth, Unwound, Trumans Water, Sleepyhead, Trans Am, Dungbeetle, and Spatula. They toured twice in the UK and once in Europe, playing with Sebadoh, Babes in Toyland, and Superchunk.

Two albums were released after the band signed to the larger label Touch and Go Records. Their debut for the label was 1996's double-length Exploded Drawing, an eclectic, progressive effort that began to delve more explicitly into the guitarists' fascination with Asian music. Drummer Watkins amicably left the band afterward to pursue career and family interests. The rest of the group was beginning to drift apart as well. Brylawski moved to New York City to attend graduate school and also traveled to India, while Bowie had already relocated to Boston by 1994 to join then-girlfriend, Helium frontwoman Mary Timony. Polvo reconvened in 1997 to record Shapes with new drummer Brian Walsby. Both Touch and Go releases featured a darker, more progressive rock-oriented sound instead of their earlier, post-punk influenced style. Rumors that it would be their final album proved true when they amicably disbanded later that year, ending their farewell US tour with a two-night stand at hometown club Cat's Cradle.

=== Hiatus and other projects ===
In 2000 Bowie released an album of home recordings on the Tiger Style label, called Yesterday...and Tomorrow's Shells under the name Libraness. He has since appeared with (current Polvo drummer Brian Quast's band) the BQ's and recorded and toured with Fan Modine. Bowie and Quast had also been working on tracks for a new Libraness album. Brylawski later played in the North Carolina–based Indonesian music-influenced band Idyll Swords, which released two albums on Communion, and currently is a member of Black Taj, as is Steve Popson. Watkins played drums in Dr. Powerful, as well as Durham outfit Stranger In The Valley of The Kings. In July 2020, Brylawski and Quast released their first album as Silver Scrolls.

=== Reunion ===
Polvo reformed with new drummer Brian Quast, formerly of Vanilla Trainwreck and The Cherry Valence, after being invited to appear at All Tomorrow's Parties 2008 and the Primavera Sound Festival in Barcelona, Spain. They also played several shows in the US, including the Northwest Music Fest in Portland. A full live set from a benefit show at Cat's Cradle in August 2008, featuring new songs and reworked versions of old songs, was made available to purchase online. In 2009, Polvo re-signed to Merge Records and released In Prism, their first studio album in 12 years. The album's release coincided with Merge Records' 20th anniversary, and Polvo were featured at a concert to honor the label at the Cat's Cradle in July. In 2010 the band toured with Versus and released their sixth album, Siberia, in 2013. The band did not undertake any promotion for its release. Polvo's last live performance to date was in 2011.

Original drummer Eddie Watkins died on April 24, 2016, at the age of forty-seven.

In January 2020, the band announced vinyl reissues of their first 2 albums: Cor-Crane Secret and Today's Active Lifestyles. The release was accompanied by a bundling option from Merge Records, which includes both albums with "updated-but-familiar" artwork (including posters & other "ephemera from the band's archive") and an expanded edition of the band's self-titled early singles compilation on translucent green vinyl. In February that year, Bowie & Popson sat down for an interview with Sadie Dupuis of the band Speedy Ortiz for Talkhouse. Reflecting on their legacy, Popson said:

We were just a band, one of a thousand really good bands at that time, that played shows. We were stoked that people actually liked listening to what we did. It still is shocking to me 30 years later. The reissue, I have no idea if it’s 40-year-old people, 50-year-old people restocking this stuff. Or if there are 18-year-old people out there buying it. I’d be shocked if it’s the latter. But I just don’t know.

== Musical style and influences ==
Polvo is widely considered to be a standard bearer of a genre which came to be known as math rock, although in interviews the band disavowed that categorization. Their sound was defined by complex and dissonant guitar harmonies and driving rhythm, complementing cryptic, often surrealist lyrics. Their sound was so unpredictable and angular that the band's guitarists were often accused of failing to play with correctly tuned guitars. Polvo's songs and artwork frequently featured Asian/"exotic" themes and references. Additionally, their music had a pronounced Eastern feel that came not only from the Indian and Middle Eastern-style drones in their compositions, but actual Eastern instruments like the sitar as well. Complex ranked both Bowie & Brylawski among indie rock's greatest guitarists, writing that the band "built most of their songs around shimmering chords and stream-of-consciousness riffs; whistling Polvo on the bus would make someone look pretty strange. They sound as if someone stared into space and imagined the strangest guitar-based song possible and then the band tackled – and generally nailed – the unenviable task of performing it."

Across various interviews, the band members have cited Isn't Anything by My Bloody Valentine, Zen Arcade by Hüsker Dü, Meat Puppets, Sonic Youth, Slint, jangle pop band Let’s Active, early R.E.M., progressive rock bands such as Mahavishnu Orchestra, Rush, King Crimson, and Can, and 60s psychedelic rock as influences on their sound among others.

== Legacy ==
On being asked by Pitchfork about their influence on modern bands in 2008, Ash Bowie said:

I don't really look for it, to be honest. I think we've had an influence, but there are other reasons why people are often found doing similar things at the same time in music, art, design, or whatever. As far as other people incorporating your style into their work, of course you'll have mixed feelings about it, but it's probably best to remain ambivalent about it. Anyway, I've always been more into music that's completely different from Polvo, so I don't run across it much.

A wide range of bands and musicians have cited Polvo as either an influence or a favorite. They include Sadie Dupuis of Speedy Ortiz, Mary Timony, Unwound, John Dwyer of Oh Sees, Bloc Party, Mark Smith of Explosions in the Sky, Ryan Adams, St. Vincent, Les Savy Fav, Modest Mouse, Dylan Baldi of Cloud Nothings, Brand New, Kyp Malone of TV on the Radio, Johnny Jewel of Chromatics, Dry Cleaning, Conan Neutron & the Secret Friends, Dogleg, Om, The Faint, Lemuria, A Minor Forest, Melissa Auf der Maur, Holy Sons, The Joggers, Leviathan, Faith Coloccia of Mamiffer, The Hair and Skin Trading Company, Alex Edkins of METZ, Pharaoh Overlord, Sean Kirkpatrick of The Paper Chase, Unwed Sailor, Posse, Sorry About Dresden, Pitchblende, Big Ups, Such Gold, Slow Mass, Tift Merritt and many others.

== Members ==
Current members

- Ash Bowie – guitar, vocals (1990-1998, 2008–present)
- Dave Brylawski – guitar, vocals (1990-1998, 2008–present)
- Steve Popson - bass (1990-1998, 2008–present)
- Brian Quast - drums (2008–present)

Former members

- Eddie Watkins - drums (1990-1996; died 2016)
- Brian Walsby - drums (1997-1998)

== Discography ==
Albums

- Cor-Crane Secret LP/CD (Merge, 1992)
- Today's Active Lifestyles LP/CD (Merge, 1993)
- Exploded Drawing CD/2×LP (Touch and Go, 1996)
- Shapes LP/CD (Touch and Go, 1997)
- In Prism LP/CD (Merge, 2009)
- Siberia LP/CD (Merge, 2013)

EPs

- Celebrate the New Dark Age (EP/ mini album) CD/3×7″ box set (Merge, 1994)
- Polvo CD (reissue of "Can I Ride" double 7-inch; Jesus Christ, 1995)
- This Eclipse CD EP (Merge, 1995)

Singles

- "Can I Ride" 2×7″ (Kitchen Puff, 1991)
- "Vibracobra" 7-inch (Rockville, 1991)
- "El Cid" split 7-inch (with Erectus Monotone; Merge, 1992)
- "Tilebreaker" 7-inch (Merge, 1993)
- "Two Fists/All The Cliches Under Broadway" split 7-inch (with New Radiant Storm King; Penny Farthing, 1994)
- "Heavy Detour" 7-inch (Merge, 2011)

Compilation appearances

- "Mexican Radio" (originally by Wall of Voodoo) on the Planned Parenthood benefit CD Tannis Root Presents: Freedom of Choice (Tannis Root, 1992)
- "Watch The Nail" on Rows of Teeth (Merge Records, 1994)
- "Reverse Migraine" on Music From The Motion Picture Reach The Rock (Hefty Records, 1998)

== Sources ==
- VH1 Bio about Polvo
- on Epitonic, with free MP3 of Tragic Carpet Ride
- Spanish Royal Dictionary "Polvo"
