= Body of Song =

Studio album by Bob Mould
- Released: July 26, 2005
- Recorded: Late 2002, and March to April, 2005
- Genre: Alternative rock
- Length: 50:48
- Label: Granary Music/Yep Roc
- Producer: Bob Mould

Bob Mould chronology
Long Playing Grooves (2002)	Body of Song (2005)	District Line (2008)

Singles from Body of Song
- 1. "Paralyzed" Released: 2005

Professional ratings
Review scores
Source	Rating
AllMusic	3.5/5 stars
Blender	4/5 stars
Entertainment Weekly	A−
Punknews.org	4.5/5 stars

Body of Song is the sixth solo album from punk/indie/alternative rock veteran Bob Mould (ex-Hüsker Dü/Sugar). It is his first studio album under his own name since 2002's controversial Modulate.

== Album history ==
Body of Song was originally meant to be a semi-acoustic record as part of an informal trilogy that included Modulate and the electronic dance album Long Playing Grooves (recorded under the pseudonym Loudbomb). Mould had accumulated quite a backlog of material to this point. High Fidelity debuted during live solo acoustic performances back in 1997.

The project was initially recorded in Athens, Georgia, with former Sugar bassist David Barbe playing bass and engineering, and Mould's 1998 tour band drummer Matt Hammon, at Barbe's Chase Park Transduction studio. After recording the initial version of the album, Mould decided to put the project aside temporarily.

After settling into a new home in Washington, District of Columbia, and furthering his interest in club music by forming the monthly Blowoff event with friend and dance music artist Richard Morel, Mould began writing new guitar-based material in 2004, often trying out new songs on audiences when giving solo vocal-and-guitar performances in clubs all over the United States. After reviving four of the recordings from the 2002 album sessions, Mould began writing and recording material in his home studio setup in his DC home, then went into DC's venerated Inner Ear Studio in March 2005 with Fugazi drummer/Garland Of Hours multi-instrumentalist Brendan Canty and Inner Ear's owner/engineer Don Zientara (who worked on most of the Dischord Records catalog, including Fugazi and Minor Threat) and cut several new songs. Canty's occasional Fugazi collaborator and Garland Of Hours bandmate Amy Domingues was tapped to contribute cello to two songs on the album.

Body of Song contained much of the electronic influence of its predecessor Modulate, but Mould's trademark guitar work, which had been buried in the former album's mix, was brought back to the forefront. Mould's club music explorations also influenced two of Body of Song's tracks, "(Shine Your) Light Love Hope" and "I Am Vision, I Am Sound", and featured Mould treating his voice with a vocoder-style digital effect (similar to what had been used on Cher's voice on her song "Believe").

== Release ==
Mould released Body of Song through a label other than directly through his own Granary Music imprint for the first time since leaving Rykodisc after the release of The Last Dog and Pony Show, signing a deal with Chapel Hill, NC-based independent label Yep Roc Records to distribute the album.

Body of Song began garnering much positive press attention in the weeks leading up to the release. An advance digital single release on iTunes of the song "Paralyzed" became an immediate hit, and a specially packaged limited-edition version sold out most of its pressing through direct advance orders (shipped to customers two weeks prior to the street date) from Yep Roc's web site (the remaining stock was saved for brick-and-mortar retail sale).

In conjunction with the release of the album, Mould formed his first live touring band since 1998, with Canty on drums, Morel on keyboards and vocals, and Jason Narducy (Rockets Over Sweden, ex-Verbow) on bass, ending a "semi-retirement" from full-band performance.

== Critical reception ==
The A.V. Club wrote that the album "finds Mould creating familiar-sounding music without simply rehashing fan favorites." The Washington Post deemed it "all over the map, a sonic mashup of Mould's career stops."

== Track listing ==
All songs written by Bob Mould and (c)(p)2005 Granary Music (BMI).

1. "Circles" – 3:56
2. "(Shine Your) Light Love Hope" – 3:58
3. "Paralyzed" – 3:54
4. "I Am Vision, I Am Sound" – 3:49
5. "Underneath Days" – 4:33
6. "Always Tomorrow" – 3:59
7. "Days of Rain" – 5:05
8. "Best Thing" – 2:51
9. "High Fidelity" – 3:48
10. "Missing You" – 2:50
11. "Gauze of Friendship" – 5:30
12. "Beating Heart the Prize" – 6:31

From the bonus disc (only available on the deluxe edition)

1. "Castor and Pollux" – 5:25
2. "Surveyors and Cranes" – 3:16
3. "Love Escalator" – 5:03
4. "Lowdown Ground" – 3:13
5. "My Old Friend" – 4:06
6. "Nihil" – 4:31
7. "(Shine Your) Light Love Hope" (Morel's Pink Noise Mix) – 7:19
8. "(Shine Your) Light Love Hope" (Morel's Pink Noise Dub) – 7:34
9. "Paralyzed" (LoudBomb Club Mix) – 8:00

== Personnel ==
Musical

- Bob Mould - guitar, vocals, bass, keyboards, loops
- Brendan Canty - drums (tracks 2–8, 12)
- Matt Hammon - drums (tracks 1, 9–11)
- David Barbe - bass (tracks 9, 11)
- Amy Domingues - cello (tracks 7, 11)

Recording

- Bob Mould - producer, mixer, engineer (Granary NYC and DC), songwriter, composer
- Don Zientara - engineer (Inner Ear)
- David Barbe - engineer (Chase Park)
- Frank Marchand - engineer (Waterford Digital)
- Steve Fallone - mastering (Sterling Sound, New York City)

== Charts ==
Chart (2005)	Peak position
US Billboard Heatseekers Albums	22
US Billboard Independent Albums	37
