= Alison Chesley =

American cellist and composer (born 1960)

- Also known as: Helen Money
- Born: January 4, 1960 (age 65); Los Angeles, California, United States
- Occupation(s): Musician, composer
- Instrument: Cello
- Years active: 1995–current
- Labels: Epic, Profound Lore, Table of the Elements, Temporary Residence, Thrill Jockey, Victory, Warner Bros., Minty Fresh, Invisible, Suicide Squeeze, Naïve, Arts & Crafts, Cellobird Records, Plate-Tec-Tonic, Premonition Records, Whitehouse Records
- Website: www.helenmoney.com

Alison Chesley (born January 4, 1960), known also by her stage name Helen Money, is a Chicago-based cellist and composer.

Chesley was born and raised in Los Angeles, California. She moved to Chicago to attend Northwestern University, where she received a master's degree in cello performance in 1994, studying with Hans Jorgen Jensen. While at Northwestern, Chesley met Jason Narducy. They performed as an acoustic rock duo called Jason & Alison (renamed Verbow), and went on to release two albums for Epic Records: Chronicles, produced by Bob Mould, and White Out, produced by Brad Wood. Opening for such bands as Frank Black, Bob Mould, Counting Crows, Live, Morrissey, Liz Phair and Brad with Stone Gossard, Verbow toured nationally for seven years. Meeting and working with Bob Mould was a big influence on Chesley forming the Helen Money project for aggressive, amplified cello.

Verbow broke up in 2001 and Chesley turned her attention to a busy career in Chicago as a composer/performer and session musician in the studio. She most often recorded at two of Chicago's busiest recording studios, Steve Albini's Electrical Audio and Soma Studios. She worked with artists including Mono, Anthrax, Broken Social Scene, Russian Circles, Chris Connelly, Poi Dog Pondering and Disturbed. She also appears on albums by Bob Mould and Rachel Grimes. In 2011, Chesley moved back to Los Angeles and switched her attention away from studio work and towards touring as Helen Money. Since then, she has toured widely across the U.S. and Europe, opening for acts such as Shellac, Earth, Nina Nastasia, Joe Lally, Mono, Sleep, Magma, Jarboe, Neurosis and Agalloch. During the spring of 2015, Chesley performed with Bob Mould on his Workbook 25 tour, which included an appearance on the Late Show with David Letterman.

In addition to Helen Money, Chesley has also composed music for film, theater and dance, including two major works for Chicago-based Mordine and Company Dance Theater, Quest and Time Stilled. In 2007 she was granted a full scholarship to study composition with guitarist/composer Fred Frith at Oakland's esteemed Mills College. She opted out of the offer, and decided against the move to concentrate on expanding her role as Helen Money.

Chesley's first solo album, the eponymous Helen Money, was released on Cellobird Records in September 2007. Her second album as Helen Money, In Tune, was released on the Table of the Elements label. In Tune was recorded at Electrical Audio by Greg Norman and mixed by Sanford Parker at Semaphore Studios in Chicago. Her third Helen Money release, Arriving Angels, came in 2013 on the Profound Lore label. It was recorded and mixed at Electrical Audio by Steve Albini. Her fourth Helen Money record, Become Zero, was released on Thrill Jockey in September 2016 and was recorded in Los Angeles at Neutral Studios and East/West Studios by Will Thomas and Ken Sluiter, and mixed by Will Thomas.

Chesley was chosen by Portishead to perform a Helen Money performance at the ATP I'll Be Your Mirror festival that they curated in July 2011 at London's Alexandra Palace, and also performed at the ATP event Nightmare Before Christmas, curated by Shellac in December 2012.

== Selected discography ==
- 2024 - Kim Deal, Nobody Loves You More (4AD)
- 2023 - Helen Money/Will Thomas, Trace (Thrill Jockey)
- 2021 - Mono, Pilgrimage of the Soul (Temporary Residence)
- 2021 - Thalia Zedek Band, Perfect Vision (Thrill Jockey)
- 2020 - Alison Chesley/Steve Albini/Tim Midyett, Music from Girl On The Floor (Touch and Go)
- 2020 - Helen Money, Atomic (Thrill Jockey)
- 2020 - Fenne Lily, Breach (Dead Oceans)
- 2019 - Bob Mould, Sunshine Rock (Merge Records)
- 2016 - Helen Money, Become Zero (Thrill Jockey)
- 2015 - Jarboe/Helen Money (Aurora Borealis)
- 2013 - Helen Money, Arriving Angels (Profound Lore)
- 2011 - Anthrax, Worship Music (Megaforce)
- 2010 - Mono Hymn to the Immortal Wind (Temporary Residence)
- 2009 - Helen Money In Tune (Table of the Elements)
- 2009 - Russian Circles Geneva (Suicide Squeeze)
- 2009 - Broken Social Scene, Forgiveness Rock Record (Arts & Crafts)
- 2007 - Alison Chesley, Helen Money (Cellobird Records)
- 2007 - Krista Franklin and Alison Chesley Aural Anarchy (Naïve)
- 2007 - Plague Bringer, Life Songs in the Land of Death (Hewhocorrupts)
- 2006 - Mono, You Are There (Temporary Residence)
- 2004 - Mono, Walking Cloud (Temporary Residence)
- 2004 - Poi Dog Pondering, In Seed Comes Fruit (Premonition Records)
- 2002 - Disturbed, Believe (Warner Bros.)
- 2001 - Chris Connelly & The Bells, Blonde Exodus (Invisible)
- 2000 - Verbow, White Out (Epic)
- 2000 - Poi Dog Pondering, Soul Sonic Orchestra (Plate-Tec-Tonic)
- 1999 - The Aluminum Group, Pedals (Minty Fresh)
- 1999 - Archer Prewitt, White Sky (Carrot Top)
- 1998 - Bob Mould, The Last Dog and Pony Show (Rykodisc Records)
- 1997 - Verbow, Chronicles (Epic)
- 1994 - Jason and Alison, Woodshed (Whitehouse Records)
