= Patch the Sky =

Studio album by Bob Mould
- Released: March 25, 2016
- Genre: Alternative rock
- Length: 44:55
- Label: Merge
- Producer: Bob Mould

Bob Mould chronology
| Beauty & Ruin (2014) | Patch the Sky (2016) | Sunshine Rock (2019) |

Patch the Sky is the 12th solo album from former Hüsker Dü and Sugar frontman Bob Mould.

== Background ==
Patch the Sky is described by Mould as the third album in a trilogy, the other two albums being 2012's Silver Age and 2014's Beauty & Ruin. This trilogy of albums began with Mould's signing to Merge Records and recruiting bassist Jason Narducy and drummer Jon Wurster into his recording and touring band.

Bob Mould initially considered making a primarily-acoustic album, much like his 1989 solo debut Workbook. The song "Hold On" dates back to this time, having been written as a "downtempo acoustic song" in 2013.

After the release of Beauty & Ruin, Mould's mother died. This, combined with other circumstances in Mould's life like "relationships ending", led to the darker tone of the album.

== Recording ==
Recording for the album occurred at Steve Albini's Chicago studio Electrical Audio, with Bob Mould serving as producer and Beau Sorenson serving as engineer.

== Title ==
The title of the album arose out of a vision Mould had, "of when people leave or things end, of something shooting through the 'fabric of the sky' and disappearing. 'Sometimes you think you want to chase it,' he says, meditating on the people or elements you lose along the way in life. 'Sometimes you get right to the edge of it, and sew it back shut and stay on the other side. Does that make sense?' You decide to patch the sky and keep going, instead of shooting through yourself."

== Critical reception ==
Professional ratings
Aggregate scores
| Source | Rating |
|---|---|
| Metacritic | 83/100 |
Review scores
| Source | Rating |
| The A.V. Club | B+ |
| AllMusic | 4/5 stars |
| Entertainment Weekly | B+ |
| Mojo | 4/5 stars |
| PopMatters | 8/10 |
| Rolling Stone | 4/5 stars |

Patch the Sky received widespread acclaim from music critics. At Metacritic, the album received an average score of 83, which indicates "universal acclaim", based on 16 reviews.

== Track listing ==
All tracks are written by Bob Mould.

| No. | Title | Length |
|---|---|---|
| 1. | "Voices in My Head" | 3:54 |
| 2. | "The End of Things" | 3:37 |
| 3. | "Hold On" | 2:55 |
| 4. | "You Say You" | 2:59 |
| 5. | "Losing Sleep" | 3:25 |
| 6. | "Pray for Rain" | 3:20 |
| 7. | "Lucifer and God" | 3:45 |
| 8. | "Daddy's Favorite" | 3:19 |
| 9. | "Hands Are Tied" | 1:44 |
| 10. | "Black Confetti" | 4:15 |
| 11. | "Losing Time" | 2:11 |
| 12. | "Monument" | 5:31 |
| Total length: | | 44:55 |

== Personnel ==
- Bob Mould - guitars, vocals, keyboards, percussion
- Jason Narducy - bass, backing vocals
- Jon Wurster - drums, percussion

== Charts ==
| Chart (2016) | Peak position |
|---|---|
| Belgian Albums (Ultratop Flanders) | 172 |
| UK Albums (OCC) | 54 |
| US Billboard 200 | 82 |
