= District line (disambiguation) =

The District line is a London Underground line.

The term "district line" may also refer to:

== Railway lines and services ==
=== United States ===
- Rock Island District
- Milwaukee District North Line
- Milwaukee District West Line

=== United Kingdom ===
District Railway, a railway that became part of the London Underground

== See also ==
- District Line (album), an alternative rock album
- A border, a literal “district line”
