= Hubcap (disambiguation) =

Hubcap is a decorative disk on an automobile wheel that covers at least a central portion of the wheel.

Hubcap may also refer to:

- Hubcap (Transformers), several characters and toys in the Transformers series
- Hubcap (album), an alternative name for the eponymous 1996 album by Bob Mould
- Hub Cap (album), a 1961 album by Freddie Hubbard
- "Hubcap", a song by Conor Oberst from his 1993 album Water
- "Hubcap", a song by Sleater-Kinney from their 1996 album Call the Doctor
