= Sea song =

Sea song or sea-song may refer to:

- a sea song (genre), a sailor's song — when expressly working songs, they are often sea shanties (a shipboard song-type which flourished in the Age of Sail's 19th century to the 20th century's first half). — As OED defined.

== Music ==
- Sea Songs, an arrangement by Ralph Vaughan Williams

=== Songs ===
- "Sea Song", by Doves from their album Lost Souls, 2000
- "Sea Song", by Faraquet from their album The View from This Tower, 2000
- "Sea Song", by Lisa Hannigan from her album Sea Sew, 2008
- "Sea Song", by Robert Wyatt from his album Rock Bottom, 1974; and which was covered by Tears for Fears on their album Songs from the Big Chair (Super Deluxe Edition), 1985

== See also ==
- Fantasia on British Sea Songs, a classical composition by Sir Henry Wood
- Sea Songs for Landlocked Sailors, an EP by the rock band Tarkio
- Rogue's Gallery: Pirate Ballads, Sea Songs, and Chanteys, a compilation album
- Sailor’s Song (disambiguation)
