= Black Sheets of Rain =

Studio album by Bob Mould
- Released: May 1990
- Recorded: March–May 1990
- Studio: Power Station, NYC
- Genre: Alternative rock
- Length: 56:05
- Label: Virgin
- Producer: Bob Mould

Bob Mould chronology
Workbook (1989)	Black Sheets of Rain (1990)	Poison Years (1994)

Singles from Black Sheets of Rain
- 1. "It's Too Late" Released: 1990

Professional ratings
Review scores
Source	Rating
AllMusic	3/5 stars
Christgau's Consumer Guide	(dud)
Entertainment Weekly	B−
Rolling Stone	4/5 stars
Select	3/5
Spin	3/5 stars

Black Sheets of Rain is the second solo album by former Hüsker Dü guitarist and singer Bob Mould and features the Modern Rock Top 10 hit "It's Too Late." The album was a return to a heavier sound following his folk influenced solo debut, Workbook. Bassist Tony Maimone and drummer Anton Fier, both veterans of Pere Ubu, once again served as Mould's rhythm section.

Following this album, Mould would take a detour from his solo career to lead the band Sugar, before returning to it once again with his self-titled 1996 album.

== Background ==
Mould later said, "With the writing of that, I had started getting ideas together when I was working up on a farm in Northern Minnesota. And then the relationship I was in ended, I moved to Hoboken, New Jersey. And most of the album got written there. It's a heavy record, much heavier in sound than Workbook. And I think a lot of that was a result of all the touring that me and Anton and Tony did. We just kept getting louder and heavier, and that informed the writing."

== Track listing ==
All tracks composed by Bob Mould.

1. "Black Sheets of Rain" – 7:42
2. "Stand Guard" – 5:31
3. "It's Too Late" – 4:03
4. "One Good Reason" – 6:18
5. "Stop Your Crying" – 4:31
6. "Hanging Tree" – 5:46
7. "The Last Night" – 4:00
8. "Hear Me Calling" – 4:57
9. "Out of Your Life" – 3:33
10. "Disappointed" – 4:10
11. "Sacrifice/Let There Be Peace" – 5:34

== Personnel ==
- Bob Mould - vocals, guitar, keyboards, percussion
- Tony Maimone - bass guitar
- Anton Fier - drums, percussion

== Charts ==
Album

Chart (1990)	Peak position
US Billboard 200	123

Single

Title	Chart (1990)	Peak position
"It's Too Late"	US Billboard Modern Rock Tracks	10
