= Workbook (disambiguation) =

A workbook is a textbook with fill-in forms for practice problems.

It may also refer to:

- Workbook (album), a music album by Bob Mould
- Tabbed document interface, a window management model
- Spreadsheet, a computer file for working with tabular data
