= Blue Hearts (album) =

Studio album by Bob Mould
- Released: September 25, 2020
- Recorded: 2019–2020
- Studios: Electrical Audio, Chicago; Granary Music, San Francisco
- Genre: Alternative rock
- Length: 35:37
- Label: Merge
- Producer: Bob Mould

Bob Mould chronology
Sunshine Rock (2019)	Blue Hearts (2020)	Here We Go Crazy (2025)

Blue Hearts is the 14th solo album by the American alternative rock musician Bob Mould, released in 2020. Mould considered the tracks to be protest songs.

The album peaked at No. 181 on the Billboard 200.

== Production ==
Mould was joined on the album by drummer Jon Wurster and bassist Jason Narducy. Thirteen of Blue Heart's 14 tracks are less than three minutes in length. Produced by Mould, it was recorded at Electrical Audio, in Chicago.

== Critical reception ==
Professional ratings
Review scores
Source	Rating
AllMusic	4.5/5 stars
Rolling Stone	4/5 stars
Winnipeg Free Press	4/5 stars

The New Yorker concluded that Mould "calls forth his hardest and most focussed music in years ... These tuneful guitar blitzkriegs have plenty of room for playfulness alongside the bile." Rolling Stone wrote that "what makes it jaw-dropping is the precision with which Mould has focused his ire on conservatives, evangelicals, homophobes, while leaving room for some self-criticism as well."

The Morning Call thought that the "blunt lyrics are matched by a furious musical assault." The Winnipeg Free Press determined that "Narducy and Wurster ... are lifers and whose relentless rock ‘n’ roll groove is the perfect complement to Mould’s spiky melodicism." The Sunday Times opined that the album "represents a howl of anger, its muddy production heightening the sense of gloom and claustrophobia."

AllMusic deemed the album "a fast, furious, passionate broadside," writing that "the sound of Blue Hearts bears a certain resemblance to the music Mould made with Hüsker Dü in its physical power and lack of emotional compromise."

== Track listing ==
All tracks are written by Bob Mould.

No.	Title	Length
1.	"Heart on My Sleeve"	1:58
2.	"Next Generation"	2:20
3.	"American Crisis"	2:28
4.	"Fireball"	1:39
5.	"Forecast of Rain"	2:26
6.	"When You Left"	2:32
7.	"Siberian Butterfly"	2:10
8.	"Everyth!ng to You"	2:51
9.	"Racing to the End"	1:51
10.	"Baby Needs a Cookie"	2:57
11.	"Little Pieces"	2:37
12.	"Leather Dreams"	2:53
13.	"Password to My Soul"	2:53
14.	"The Ocean"	3:56

== Personnel ==
- Bob Mould – lead vocals, guitar, keyboards, percussion
- Jason Narducy – bass, backing vocals
- Jon Wurster – drums, percussion

Additional musicians

- Prague TV Orchestra – strings on "American Crisis"
- Alison Chesley; Paul Martens – orchestral score transcriptions

Production

- Bob Mould – producer
- Beau Sorenson – engineer
- Matthew Barnhart – mastering
- Daniel Murphy – art design
- Blake Little – photography
