= Circle of Friends (Bob Mould video) =

Video by Bob Mould
- Released: October 15, 2007 (US); October 15, 2007 (UK)
- Recorded: 7 October 2005
- Length: 111:00
- Label: Granary Music

Professional ratings
Review scores
Source	Rating
PopMatters	8/10 stars
Blogcritics	(positive)
allmusic	(positive)

Circle of Friends is a DVD by Bob Mould of a live concert recorded in 2005 at the 9:30 Club in Washington, D.C. The performance included songs from Mould's earlier bands Hüsker Dü and Sugar, as well as his solo work. This particular show was part of the Body of Song tour, Mould's first non-solo tour for over a decade and the first one in which Hüsker Dü material was played in a band format since the band broke up in 1988.

== Band ==
- Bob Mould (guitar, vocals)
- Brendan Canty (drums)
- Jason Narducy (bass)
- Richard Morel (keyboards)

== Track listing ==
1. "The Act We Act" (Sugar)
2. "A Good Idea" (Sugar)
3. "Changes" (Sugar)
4. "Circles" (Bob Mould)
5. "Paralyzed" (Bob Mould)
6. "I Am Vision, I Am Sound" (Bob Mould)
7. "Underneath Days" (Bob Mould)
8. "Hoover Dam" (Sugar)
9. "See a Little Light" (Bob Mould)
10. "High Fidelity" (Bob Mould)
11. "Hardly Getting Over It" (Hüsker Dü)
12. "Could You Be the One?" (Hüsker Dü)
13. "I Apologize" (Hüsker Dü)
14. "Chartered Trips" (Hüsker Dü)
15. "The Receipt" (Bob Mould)
16. "Best Thing" (Bob Mould)
17. "Celebrated Summer" (Hüsker Dü)
  (encore break)
18. "Beating Heart the Prize" (Bob Mould)
19. "Egoverride" (Bob Mould)
20. "If I Can't Change Your Mind" (Sugar)
  (encore break)
21. "Helpless" (Sugar)
22. "Makes No Sense at All" (Hüsker Dü)
23. "Man on the Moon" (Sugar)
