= Poison Years =

Compilation album by Bob Mould
- Released: July 26, 1994
- Genre: Alternative rock
- Length: 71:01
- Label: Virgin
- Producer: Bob Mould, Timothy Powell

Bob Mould chronology
Black Sheets of Rain (1990)	Poison Years (1994)	Bob Mould (1996)

Professional ratings
Review scores
Source	Rating
Allmusic	3.5/5 stars

Poison Years is a compilation album by Bob Mould, who had been the guitarist and co-vocalist of the influential American rock band Hüsker Dü. It is essentially a condensed version of Mould's first two solo albums on Virgin Records, Workbook (1989) and Black Sheets of Rain (1990), and was released in mid-1994 after Mould had achieved considerable success with his new band Sugar. It contains 6 (out of 11) studio tracks from Black Sheets and 5 (out of 11) tracks from Workbook, of which 3 are previously unreleased live versions. In addition, the album contains a studio outtake from the Workbook period, "All Those People Know", a live version of another non-album track, "If You're True", and a live cover version of "Shoot Out The Lights" from the eponymous 1982 album by Richard and Linda Thompson.

== Track listing ==
1. "Black Sheets Of Rain" – 7:40 from Black Sheets of Rain (1990)
2. "It's Too Late" – 4:01 from Black Sheets of Rain (1990)
3. "Stop Your Crying" – 4:29 from Black Sheets of Rain (1990)
4. "Out Of Your Life" – 3:32 from Black Sheets of Rain (1990)
5. "Hanging Tree" – 5:44 from Black Sheets of Rain (1990)
6. "Sacrifice / Let There Be Peace" – 5:33 from Black Sheets of Rain (1990)
7. "Wishing Well" – 5:11 from Workbook (1989)
8. "See A Little Light" – 3:31 from Workbook (1989)
9. "All Those People Know" – 3:38 outtake from Workbook (1989)
10. "Compositions For The Young And Old" (Live) – 4:19 original on Workbook (1989)
11. "If You're True" (Live) – 4:34 previously unreleased
12. "Poison Years" (Live) – 5:40 original on Workbook (1989)
13. "Brasilia Crossed With Trenton" (Live) – 7:09 original on Workbook (1989)
14. "Shoot Out The Lights" (Live) – 5:55 original on Shoot Out The Lights by Richard and Linda Thompson (1982)

All tracks written by Bob Mould, except track 14, written by Richard Thompson. Tracks 1–9 produced by Bob Mould, tracks 10–14 produced by Timothy Powell, mixed by Bob Mould.

== Personnel ==
- Bob Mould – vocals, guitar, mandolin, keyboards, percussion
- Tony Maimone – bass guitar
- Anton Fier – drums
- Jane Scarpantoni – cello
- Chris Stamey – rhythm guitar & backing vocals (live tracks)
- Steven Haigler – percussion (Workbook studio tracks)
