= Modulate (album) =

Studio album by Bob Mould
- Released: March 12, 2002
- Studio: Granary 6, New York City; Bearsville, Bearsville, New York
- Genre: Electronic; power pop
- Length: 47:38
- Label: Granary Music
- Producer: Bob Mould

Bob Mould chronology
The Last Dog and Pony Show (1998)	Modulate (2002)	Long Playing Grooves (2002)

Singles from Modulate
- 1. "Soundonsound" Released: 2002

Modulate is Bob Mould's fifth solo album, released in 2002. Although a few tracks on his previous release, The Last Dog and Pony Show, had featured tape loops and samples, Mould shocked his fans with such a dramatic embrace of electronica.

Mould dubbed the tour supporting this album The Carnival of Light and Sound. It featured him performing alone on stage, backed by prerecorded tracks as short films were projected on screens behind him.

== Background and production ==
Bob Mould issued his fourth studio album The Last Dog and Pony Show in 1998, marking his final release for the record label Rykodisc. During tours in promotion for it, Mould billed it as a demise to the "punk-rocky guitar guy standing at stage left, jumping around and yelling", having spent the previous two decades playing alternative rock and hardcore punk with his prior bands Hüsker Dü and Sugar,. By the end of the year, he had become tired of working with a full band in a live environment. This aspect, combined with Mould consuming club music from living in New York City, particularly in Chelsea, Manhattan, marked the beginning of his next album. Writing for it initially began in early 1999, until he spent sometime away from music, focusing on his personal life, including losing weight.

Mould worked as a consultant for the World Championship Wrestling company between late 1999 and early 2000. For some months following this position, he discovered electronic acts such as John Digweed, Paul Van Dyk, Richard Morel, Swayzak and Nick Warren, in addition to Version 2.0 (1998) by Garbage. He came to the conclusion that it was not dissimilar from the music he was previously making with guitars, highlighting the building of chords and adding grooves to single notes. One electronic release in particular, Xpander (1999) by Sasha, served as an inspiration; he subsequently purchased new electronic equipment for his studio. He re-learned the songwriting process, solely with samplers, synthesizers and digital recorders. He sampled seven-inch singles of other artists work, but abandoned this method after a couple months when it dawned on him that he was attempting it like a DJ would, and would have to pay to release material like that. He started to sample guitar parts and grooves he made on his own and alter them, eventually making loops and drum sequences. Mould remarked that it was easier crafting this material than making his debut studio album Workbook (1989), where he had to "sit down and relearn the guitar", whereas for the new songs, he "pick[ed] up a different set of tools, trying to supplement my songwriting and storytelling style". Mould produced Modulate at Granary 6 in New York City and Bearsville Studios in Bearsville, New York, with Damien Shannon serving as engineer at the latter. Mould then mixed the recordings at Granary 6 and The Hit Factory, also located in New York City.

== Composition and lyrics ==
=== Overview ===
Modulate is an electronic and power pop album, which evoked the sound of New Order; it takes its name from a lyric in "Comeonstrong". Chris Larry of CMJ New Music Report compared it to the work of Erasure with the 1980s-esque keyboards, "elements of house music and an overall, industrialized sci-fi sound". Mould said he was against disco and electronic music when those styles emerged at the end of the 1970s, only for him to change his mind: "Now, 25 years later, I'm looking at it, going, 'This is really interesting.'" City Pages reviewer Peter S. Scholtes said it "mirrors the strengths and weaknesses" of Good News for Modern Man (1999) by former Hüsker Dü bandmate Grant Hart. God Is in the TV writer Humphrey Fordham suggested that the drum and bass and trip hop track "Megamanic" from The Last Dog and Pony Show laid the groundwork for Modulate, comparing the album to other releases that saw legacy acts "going out on a limb", such as Don Juan's Reckless Daughter (1977) by Joni Mitchell and Trans (1983) by Neil Young. Jon Wurster of Indy Week pointed out Mould's 1996 self-titled album for its employment of drum machines, in addition to highlighting "Megamanic" for it being Mould's initial foray into electronic music.

AllMusic reviewer Stephen Thomas Erlewine commented that the tracks were presented differently from Mould's other works: "they're insular, one-man creations (even more so than Workbook), as that man tries to expand his art by grappling with new technologies and trends and a whole bunch of electronic instruments and computers". PopMatters contributor Gary Glauber mentioned that Mould's "pop sensibility remains—only it's a palette of vocoder, distortion, loops, samples, and other noise tricks from which he paints his sound pictures now", adding that it "does not totally abandon the past; occasional strains of that familiar Mould guitar sound are evident". The Austin Chronicle writer Dan Oko remarked that it delivered an electronic sound with "synthetic vocals that owe more to Daft Punk and Madonna than his SST heyday". Glauber noted that the tracks that feature the "electronic effects seem curiously concentrated" on the album's first half; after this, Mould's previous guitar sound returns with "Slay / Sway" and "The Receipt", recalling the material by Sugar. Mould said he wanted to make an artistic statement by putting the electronic-focused songs on the first half.

One track, 'Trade', was written back in 1987 and was actually played live by Husker Du on at least two occasions, during their last ever concerts.

=== Tracks ===
"180 Rain", which beings with car alarm and siren sounds, uses a vocoder effect in a similar vein to that of Cher and Daft Punk. Glauber thought the added sounds "enhance the lyrical idea of 'a catastrophe is happening tonight', like rain that can't be stopped, another unhappy relationship". For the Philip Glass-tinged "Sunset Safety Glass", Glauber said it "trades on repetition to drive home its musical point, while oddly juxtaposed lyrical images seek to disturb" the listener. Rolling Stone reviewer Pat Blashill wrote that "Semper Fi" has a baroque structure consisting of "wheezing, calliope-style synth effects and squiggles, with Mould's drawling, side-of-the-mouth vocals and guitars roaring away underneath everything". The song talks about a private love affair in the military, and is followed by the instrumental "Homecoming Parade", which features two minutes of bagpipes and other samples. In "Lost Zoloft", Mould's stream of consciousness lyrics, which discuss self-doubt, is anchored around keyboard percussion. The staff at The A.V. Club prosed that it dealt with the "underreported phenomenon of same-sex spousal abuse", while one of the lyrics could be interpretated as being "about any abusive relationship, until he mentions 'a latent homosex becomes so violent when provoked.'" Preceded by the musique concrète track "Without?", Oko said with the guitar-centric "Slay / Sway", Mould shows that he "may yet find a way to align his Midwestern godfather-of-grunge past and NYC club-hopping present".

"The Receipt" recalled the direction of The Last Dog and Pony Show with its guitar sound, sans electronic coda. Sam Lambeth of Louder Than War theorised if it was about Mould's strained relationship with Hart. According to Glauber, "Quasar" sees Mould use "synthesizers, samplers, and digital toys in another interesting layered clatter that's tuneful and catchy, but suffers from its halfway treatment". "Soundonsound" talks about a couple staying together despite growing apart from one another. "Hornery" is a short, minute-long instrumental song consisting of guitar feedback, akin to "Arc-Weld" (1991) by Young. "Comeonstrong" is an alternative rock track, which blends Mould's guitar sound and the electronic edge of the other songs on the album. During it, he describes the struggle of finding balance in life. "Trade" recalled the works of New Order and Pet Shop Boys, while its lyrics, as Jonathan Cohen of Nude as the News writes, sees Mould "wrestles with the most basic of requests: he won't give 'the answer' until he can pre-determine what the implied tradeoff is". The album's closing track, "Author's Lament", mixes digital percussion and an electric piano, initially beginning as a sparse arrangement that eventually builds into noisy feedback. It tries to merge the sound of Aphex Twin and Joe Jackson.

== Release ==
In the February 9, 2002 issue of Billboard, Modulate was announced for release the following month, and was expected to be followed by two more albums from Mould that same year. It was issued on March 12, 2002 through the label Granary Music, which Mould founded. A year prior, he had nearly signed to another label, before deciding to start his own. It stemmed from an instance where HBO wanted to license one of his past songs, "Sunspots" from Workbook, from his previous label Virgin Records, but were unable to due to the high cost Virgin wanted. Mould looked for other avenues of distribution, until his publicist Carla Sacks suggest contacting Michael Hausman from United Musicians, who were located two blocks from Mould's residence. Design company Gay Power Elite did the artwork for the album, while Lisa Pearl contributed a picture of Mould. In the UK, the album was issued through Cooking Vinyl, who included videos for "Slay / Sway", "Comeonstrong" and "Sunset Safety Glass" on it. Two months into its release, Mould said he was "already six figures in the red", and that the album had leaked earlier than its release.

Mould subsequently enlisted radio pluggers from college and triple-A stations to help promote Modulate. He planned to embarked on the Carnival of Light and Sound tour, which was held in small theatres across the US, which would see him split the set between the new album and his back catalogue. With Mould in charge of the production, 32 videos were made to accompany the shows, utilizing a rear-projection setup. For the older songs, he was expected to play different renditions of them, "I don't know how people are going to take to the drum'n'bass version of Hüsker Dü" material. "Soundonsound" was released as the album's sole single in 2002, with "Slay / Sway" and "Sunset Safety Glass" as its B-sides. The music video for "SoundonSound", which was directed by Scott Stuckey, features footage of Mould playing a guitar, interspersed with animation of a couple interacting with various animals.

Modulate was reissued on CD as part of the career-spanning box set Distortion: 1989 – 2019 (2020), and on vinyl as part of the smaller Distortion: 1996 – 2007 (2021) box set. Alongside this, "180 Rain" was included on the compilation album Distortion: The Best of 1989 – 2019 (2021).

== Critical reception ==
Professional ratings
Aggregate scores
Source	Rating
Metacritic	61/100
Review scores
Source	Rating
AllMusic	2/5 stars
The Austin Chronicle	2/4 stars
Blender	3/5 stars
Entertainment Weekly	C+
Nude as the News	6/10
Rolling Stone	2.5/5 stars
Spin	2.5/5 stars
The Village Voice	(dud)

Modulate was met with generally favourable reviews from music critics. At Metacritic, which assigns a normalized rating out of 100 to reviews from mainstream publications, the album received an average score of 61, based on 11 reviews. Mould said he saw mixed reviews, ranging from "''What the hell is this?' to 'This is great!'" He mentioned that his lifelong follows were divided: "the ones who think it's blasphemous and the ones who, on second listen, realize it's me. Then there's a group who isn't familiar with the history--and then they hear the record and they love it".

Several reviewers commented on the change in Mould's sound. Erlewine said that at points, Mould seems "more interested in what these new [electronic] tools can do than using them to complete his songs, which illustrates just how determined he is to find a new way to make music". Oko felt that it "relies on computer-generated synthesizer riffs and comes across as a half-assed experiment" as a result. Wolk saw it as a "transitional album: Mould sprinting away from his past". Blashill said "Ultimately, this is a rock record with electronic effects, not a techno record with guitars, and it falls short of being totally satisfying as either. But Modulate isn't a failure so much as a first step". Steve Kandell of Spin said it "reflected his newfound fascination with dance music, striking a balance between post-punk gravitas and electronic bacchanalia" which would surprise older fans of his work. Larry said that with "playing and tweaking all the noisemakers, he gives even the most programmed moments a homespun feel". Glauber said "not all of these noise-pop songs achieve the right degree of unity and balance between old and new. Some get lost in a limbo of electronic cacophony, with too many elements not coming together to match Mould's pop-songwriting skill". Michelle Kleinsak of CMJ New Music Monthly said Mould "doesn't seem entirely comfortable with or committed to this world of loops and samples".

Few remarks were made on the album's lyrics. Oko said "longtime fans will be disappointed to find few signs of the distorted guitar sounds and strangled, angst-ridden lyrics" that were staples of Husker Du and Sugar. Douglas Wolk of Blenderwrote that the lyrics were nearly "buried in the mix, although the discernible ones are almost suffocatingly bitter". Glauber thought that it delivered "simple chordal structures, direct lyrical content and manages to mirror the density of Mould's sonic layering in media other than guitar".

Critics were mixed on the overall quality of the album. Erlewine remarked that it was the "sound of growing pains. Since Mould is an accomplished songwriter, there are some good songs here (although there are many more that miss the mark), but the defining characteristic of this album is not the songs, but the approach to the songs -- the way he layers on sequencers and vocoders as if each subsequent overdub brought him further into new sonic territory, even when his writing hasn't changed that much". Oko said that it would shock listeners "and that's not necessarily a compliment"; Cohen expanded on this, saying that while the album starts to "make more sense after (many) repeat listens, the overall results are at best uneven, and at worst, absolutely baffling". Entertainment Weekly''s Ethan Smith wrote that it was a "forgettable CD larded with limp electronic experimentation. Mould's in safer territory on the handful of straightforward guitar rock that remains his strength". Christie Leo of New Straits Times similar stated that "its blend of insinuating hooks and automatic-brew throb sounds corny". Blashill considered it to be "more akin to the work of a devoted Beatles fan exploring a new studio full of electronic equipment".

Fordham noted that Mould would go fully electronic with Long Playing Grooves (2002), under the moniker Loudbomb. He also mentioned that "Quasar" acted as a sort of "blueprint for Radiohead's In Rainbows five years in advance". Stereogum's Michael Nelson ranked Modulate as Mould's worst release, as of 2012, as he "frequently sounds out of his comfort zone and unsure of himself". Kyle Ryan of The A.V. Club cautioned listeners that Modulate was "only for advanced studies" of Mould's work, adding that it is "worth hearing as a stylistic experiment, and it has good moments, but new fans would be better off digging through the rest of his work first".

== Track listing ==
All songs written by Bob Mould.

1. "180 Rain" – 3:45
2. "Sunset Safety Glass" – 4:21
3. "Semper Fi" – 3:58
4. "Homecoming Parade" – 2:03
5. "Lost Zoloft" – 3:18
6. "Without?" – 1:41
7. "Slay / Sway" – 4:09
8. "The Receipt" – 2:26
9. "Quasar" – 4:17
10. "Soundonsound" – 4:05
11. "Hornery" – 1:04
12. "Comeonstrong" – 3:43
13. "Trade" – 5:24
14. "Author's Lament" – 3:24

== Personnel ==
Personnel per booklet.

Musicians

- Bob Mould – vocals, guitar, synthesizers

Production and design

- Bob Mould – producer, mixing
- Damien Shannon – engineer
- Gay Power Elite – artwork, design
- Lisa Pearl – portrait of Bob

== Charts ==
Chart (2002)	Peak position
US Billboard Heatseekers Albums	45
US Billboard Independent Albums	18
US Billboard Internet Albums	19

== See also ==
- Cyberpunk – a 1993 album, which mixes rock and electronic music, by Billy Idol, also previously of a punk band
- Grebo – a genre that mixes alternative rock and electronic music
