= District Line (album) =

Studio album by Bob Mould
- Released: February 5, 2008
- Genre: Alternative rock
- Label: Anti–
- Producer: Bob Mould

Bob Mould chronology
Body of Song (2005)	District Line (2008)	Life and Times (2009)

Singles from District Line
- 1. "The Silence Between Us" Released: January 8, 2008

Professional ratings
Review scores
Source	Rating
AllMusic	4.5/5 stars
Pitchfork	6.3/10
Rolling Stone	3.5/5 stars

District Line is the seventh solo album from former Hüsker Dü and Sugar frontman Bob Mould.

Returning from his previous solo album, Body of Song, are drummer Brendan Canty, of Fugazi fame, and cellist Amy Domingues. Mould handled all of the other instruments himself.

The closer, "Walls in Time," is actually a track that failed to make his 1989 solo debut, Workbook.

== Release ==
"The Silence Between Us" was released as a single on January 8, 2008. District Line was released on February 5, 2008; Mould promoted it with a US tour in the following month. Following this, he appeared at the Pukkelpop festival.

== Track listing ==
All songs written by Bob Mould.

1. "Stupid Now" – 4:06
2. "Who Needs to Dream" – 3:57
3. "Again and Again" – 5:21
4. "Old Highs New Lows" – 4:00
5. "Return to Dust" – 4:24
6. "The Silence Between Us" – 3:34
7. "Shelter Me" – 3:53
8. "Very Temporary" – 3:11
9. "Miniature Parade" – 3:34
10. "Walls in Time" – 6:12

== Personnel ==
- Bob Mould – vocals, guitar, bass, keyboards, percussion, programming
- Brendan Canty – drums, additional engineering
- Amy Domingues – cello

Technical

- Frank Marchand – recording
- Jim Wilson – mastering
- Brett Marden – artwork
- Peter Ross – portrait

== Charts ==
Chart (2008)	Peak position
US Billboard 200	191
US Billboard Heatseekers Albums	5
US Billboard Independent Albums	24
