= Beauty & Ruin =

Studio album by Bob Mould
- Released: June 3, 2014
- Recorded: 2013–14
- Studios: Electrical Audio, (Chicago, Illinois)
- Genre: Alternative rock
- Length: 36:16
- Label: Merge
- Producer: Bob Mould

Bob Mould chronology
Silver Age (2012)	Beauty & Ruin (2014)	Patch the Sky (2016)

Beauty & Ruin is the 11th solo album from former Hüsker Dü and Sugar frontman Bob Mould. It is his highest-charting solo album, peaking at No. 38 on the US Billboard 200.

== Critical reception ==
Professional ratings
Aggregate scores
Source	Rating
Metacritic	76/100
Review scores
Source	Rating
AllMusic	4/5 stars
The A.V. Club	B+
Blurt	3/5 stars
Drowned in Sound	9/10
Paste	8/10
Pitchfork	7.3/10
PopMatters	9/10 stars
Rolling Stone	3.5/5 stars

Upon its release, Beauty & Ruin was met with positive reviews. At Metacritic, which assigns a weighted mean rating out of 100 to reviews from mainstream critics, the album received an average score of 76, which indicates "generally favourable reviews".

== Track listing ==
All tracks are written by Bob Mould.

No.	Title	Length
1.	"Low Season"	4:08
2.	"Little Glass Pill"	2:39
3.	"I Don't Know You Anymore"	2:55
4.	"Kid with Crooked Face"	2:14
5.	"Nemeses Are Laughing"	3:23
6.	"The War"	3:40
7.	"Forgiveness"	2:54
8.	"Hey Mr. Grey"	2:03
9.	"Fire in the City"	3:14
10.	"Tomorrow Morning"	2:18
11.	"Let the Beauty Be"	3:16
12.	"Fix It"	3:25
Total length:		36:16

== Personnel ==
- Bob Mould - guitars, vocals, keyboards, photography, producer
- Jason Narducy - bass
- Jon Wurster - drums

== Charts ==
Chart (2014)	Peak position
UK Albums Chart	96
UK Alternative Albums	16
UK Rock Albums	8
US Billboard 200	38
US Billboard Independent Albums	5
US Billboard Alternative Albums	9
US Billboard Top Rock Albums	9
