= See a Little Light =

Single by Bob Mould

from the album Workbook
- Released: 1989
- Recorded: December 1988 – January 1989
- Genre: Alternative rock
- Label: Virgin
- Songwriter: Bob Mould
- Producer: Bob Mould

Bob Mould singles chronology
| "See a Little Light" (1989) | "Wishing Well EP" (1989) |

"See a Little Light" is a 1989 song by alternative rock musician Bob Mould for his debut solo album Workbook. Written by Mould about his optimism after the break-up of his previous band, Hüsker Dü, the song features relatively upbeat lyrics and a light arrangement highlighted by clean electric guitar and cello.

It was released as the debut single from Workbook, charting on the alternative charts in America. The song was boosted by a music video. It has since received positive reception from critics and has served as the title for Mould's memoir.

== Background ==
"See a Little Light" was written by Mould in 1988, a period he spent alone in Pine City, Minnesota, after the break-up of his previous band, Hüsker Dü. Mould recalled,

This just fell out of the sky. Coming out of the breakup of Hüsker Dü and a year on the farm [in Pine City, north of Minneapolis], writing nonstop mostly by myself, that was one of the brighter moments of that writing process. I don't know if it was inspired by a sunny day or one of the chickens on the farm. But what an optimistic song given how isolated I was and how shocking life after Hüsker Dü was for me. I was living a singular, solitary existence. I wouldn't say my relationship at the time was hopeless, but it was pretty far out of reach that anything positive would come. So I'm seeing a little light. Not a ton! [Laughs] Just a glimpse of hope.

Musically, the song features a jangly, acoustic style. The song also features backing strings, a theme common on Workbook. Mould commented, "A positive chord structure, and the chorus is so up, so jangly and bright. I was messing around with alternate tunings. A bright moment on an otherwise fairly overcast record."

== Release ==
"See a Little Light" was released on Workbook in April 1989. The song was released as the debut single from the album, with "All Those People Know" on the B-side. The song was a success in alternative rock circles, reaching number 4 on the Modern Rock Tracks chart in July 1989. The song was also released on the compilation album Never Mind the Mainstream: The Best of MTV's 120 Minutes, which featured songs from various alternative artists.

A music video was produced to accompany the song. Mould recalled the video negatively, saying, "I remember making that video. Such a beautiful song and such a cheesy and expensive video. No offense to the filmmakers, but my God. It was like, 'Wardrobe, what's that?' 'Hair stylist? What?' 'That'll be $5,000!'"

The song has since become a live staple of Mould's solo setlist. It has also provided the title to Mould's memoir, See a Little Light: The Trail of Rage and Melody.

== Reception ==
"See a Little Light" has generally seen positive reception from critics. Heather Phares of AllMusic called the song "excellent" and said that it was among the songs on the Never Mind the Mainstream album that "retain their status as underground classics yet still sound fresh, aging far more gracefully than the grunge and nu-metal that supplanted them." The same site's Stewart Mason said, "Musically, the song is a wonder; the prettiness that lurked just under the surface of so many of Mould's Husker Du songs is in full view here." Pitckfork's Jason Heller said the song "boasts one of most searing choruses of [Mould's] career", while Parry Gettelman of The Orlando Sentinel said the song has an "instant hook."
