= Here We Go Crazy =

Studio album by Bob Mould
- Released: March 7, 2025
- Recorded: 2024
- Studio: Electrical Audio, Chicago; Tiny Telephone, Oakland; Brothers (Chinese), Oakland; Granary, San Francisco and Palm Springs
- Genre: Power pop
- Length: 31:12
- Label: Granary; BMG
- Producer: Bob Mould

Bob Mould chronology
Blue Hearts (2020)	Here We Go Crazy (2025)

Singles from Here We Go Crazy
- 1. "Here We Go Crazy" Released: January 8, 2025

Here We Go Crazy is the fifteenth studio album by American alternative rock musician Bob Mould. It was released on March 7, 2025, via Granary Music and BMG Rights Management in LP, CD and digital formats, and features the sole single, "Here We Go Crazy". It appeared on the Scottish Albums Chart at 20, the UK Independent Albums Chart at 5, and the UK Rock & Metal Albums Chart at 4.

== Background ==
Consisting of eleven tracks ranging between two and four minutes each with a total runtime of approximately thirty-one minutes, Here We Go Crazy was released five years after Mould's 2020 full-length release, Blue Hearts. It was produced by Mould and mixed by Beau Sorenson in 2024 at Electrical Audio in Chicago, with additional work completed in Tiny Telephone Studios of Oakland. Mould also recorded the album in Electrical Audio with his bassist and drummer collaborators, Jason Narducy and Jon Wurster. Incorporating punk and post-grunge, the album was noted as centering on the themes of uncertainty and refuge.

The title track was released as the lead single of the album on January 8, 2025. A music video directed by Gus Black was released alongside the single. Mould commented about the shooting of the video that it occurred in a desert in Southern California during his time there, referring to songs on the album as "straightforward guitar pop", and the title as having originated from ideas such as impulsivity, uncertainty and solitude.

== Reception ==
Professional ratings
Review scores
Source	Rating
AllMusic	4/5 stars
Clash	7/10
Financial Times	3/5 stars
God Is in the TV	9/10
Louder Than War	4/5 stars
MusicOMH	4/5 stars
PopMatters	8/10
Record Collector	4/5 stars
Rolling Stone	4/5 stars
Uncut	4/5 stars

In a four-star review, Record Collector's critic described the album as influenced by "issues that upset and bother his conscience" and "less directly furious" than its predecessor, noting the manner of Mould's "venting" on the album as "introspective", "more ambiguous" and "melancholic in nature". Writing for Financial Times, Ludovic Hunter-Tilney commented that it lacks the "electric charge" of its predecessor but "finds comfort in the familiar contours" in Mould's musical style.

It was described as an album of "self-reflection through his heartfelt rasp and intricate songwriting" by Mxdwn's Mark D'Alessandro, "a clear-eyed, but not despairing, song cycle" in Brian Stout's review for PopMatters, "an album that reflects the chaos of the culture that witnessed its creation" by AllMusic's Mark Deming, and "a throwback to Hüsker Dü, with just slightly less guitar distortion" in Lee Wakefield's Clash review.

Assigning Here We Go Crazy four stars, Jon Dolan of Rolling Stone observed that the album is reflective of the "same landscape of tumultuous noise and roiling emotions he's been navigating" since 1979. Sam Lambeth of Louder Than War referred to it as "a record that plays to Mould's musical strengths – taut, jagged melodies with shards of sweetness always threatening to poke through – without sounding tired or repetitive." Daniel Dylan Wray, reviewing for Uncut, noted the similarity between the album and its predecessor as "striking, sharp, sub-three-minute bursts of intense pop-coated alternative rock that recalls the fizzy joy of the Buzzcocks."

God Is in the TV writer Loz Etheridge stated, it is "probably closer to" Copper Blue by Sugar "than anything else he's ever put out", calling it a "highly palatable record." Referring to the tone as "furiously loud" and the songs as "full of grit, sadness and darkness", John Murphy of MusicOMH opined that the album was unlikely to attract a new audience but sufficient to "satisfy" existing fans.

== Track listing ==
All tracks are written by Bob Mould.

Here We Go Crazy track listing
No.	Title	Length
1.	"Here We Go Crazy"	2:56
2.	"Neanderthal"	2:13
3.	"Breathing Room"	2:54
4.	"Hard to Get"	2:26
5.	"When Your Heart Is Broken"	2:42
6.	"Fur Mink Augurs"	3:52
7.	"Lost or Stolen"	3:06
8.	"Sharp Little Pieces"	2:18
9.	"You Need to Shine"	3:06
10.	"Thread So Thin"	2:58
11.	"Your Side"	2:41
Total length:		31:12

== Personnel ==
Credits adapted from the album's liner notes.

- Bob Mould – guitars, vocals, keyboards, percussion, production
- Jason Narducy – bass
- Jon Wurster – drums, percussion
- Beau Sorenson – engineering
- Jeff Lipton – mastering
- Maria Rice – mastering
- Costanza Tinti – mastering assistance
- Bob Weston – lacquer master cutting
- Ryan Bakerink – album artwork

== Charts ==
Chart performance for Here We Go Crazy
Chart (2025)	Peak position
UK Independent Albums (OCC)	5
UK Rock & Metal Albums (OCC)	4
Scottish Albums (OCC)	20

== Release history ==
Release history for Here We Go Crazy
Date	Format(s)	Label(s)	Catalogue	Ref.
March 7, 2025	Compact disc	Granary Music	964140192	
March 7, 2025	LP, streaming, digital download	Granary Music	964140211	
March 7, 2025	LP, streaming, digital download	BMG	168074	
