= Sailor's Song =

Sailor's Song may refer to:

- Sea song (disambiguation)
- Sailor's Song, a 1943 novel by James Hanley
- Sailor's Song, a 2004 play John Patrick Shanley
- Sailor's Song (film), a 1932 French film
- The Sailor's Song, a 1958 East German film
- "A Sailor's Song", a 1995 song by Richard Faith
- "The Sailor's Song", a song by Bobby Hutcherson from the 1979 album Un Poco Loco
