= Life and Times (Bob Mould album) =

Studio album by Bob Mould
- Released: April 7, 2009
- Genre: Alternative rock
- Label: Anti-
- Producer: Bob Mould

Bob Mould chronology
District Line (2008)	Life and Times (2009)	Silver Age (2012)

Life and Times is the eighth solo album from former Hüsker Dü and Sugar frontman Bob Mould.

== Reception ==
Professional ratings
Review scores
Source	Rating
AllMusic	4/5 stars
Rolling Stone	3/5 stars
Spin	3.5/5 stars

Initial critical response to Life And Times was positive. At Metacritic, which assigns a normalized rating out of 100 to reviews from mainstream critics, the album has received an average score of 73, based on 8 reviews.

== Track listing ==
All tracks written by Bob Mould.

1. "Life and Times" - 4:11
2. "The Breach" - 3:45
3. "City Lights (Days Go By)" - 3:45
4. "MM 17" - 3:39
5. "Argos" - 2:03
6. "Bad Blood Better" - 3:46
7. "Wasted World" - 4:00
8. "Spiraling Down" - 3:08
9. "I'm Sorry, Baby, but You Can't Stand in My Light Anymore" - 3:11
10. "Lifetime" - 4:46

== Personnel ==
- Bob Mould – vocals, guitars, bass, keyboards, percussion, programming, producer, mixing, layout
- Jon Wurster – drums
- Frank Marchand – drum recording
- Jim Wilson – mastering
- Tom D. Kline – layout
- Micheal Brodbeck – photography

== Charts ==
Chart (2009)	Peak position
US Billboard Heatseekers Albums	7
