= The View from This Tower =

Studio album by Faraquet
- Released: 2000
- Recorded: February 2000
- Genre: Post-hardcore, math rock
- Length: 36:57
- Label: Dischord

The View from This Tower is the only full-length album by the American post-hardcore band Faraquet. It was released on Dischord Records in 2000 (Dischord #122). The album was the band's fourth, and last, recorded work.

== Production ==
The album was produced by J. Robbins at Inner Ear Studios.

== Critical reception ==
Professional ratings
Review scores
Source	Rating
AllMusic	3/5 stars
Pitchfork	8.0/10.0
Portland Mercury	3.5/4 stars

The Washington Post wrote that "the band has no interest in comfortable or communal moments ... Its stand-offishness, however, is frequently bracing." Exclaim! called the album "a mesmerising blend of jagged, jazz-tinged, indie math rock."

== Track listing ==
No.	Title	Length
1.	"Cut Self Not"	2:54
2.	"Carefully Planned"	3:40
3.	"The Fourth Introduction"	3:17
4.	"Song for Friends to Me"	1:37
5.	"Conceptual Separation of Self"	6:43
6.	"Study in Complacency"	5:05
7.	"Sea Song"	4:10
8.	"The View from This Tower"	5:55
9.	"The Missing Piece"	3:29

== Personnel ==
Adapted from the album's liner notes.

Faraquet

- Jeff Boswell – bass, feedback guitar
- Chad Molter – drums, percussion, vocals, piccolo bass, keyboards
- Devin Ocampo – guitar, vocals, drums, percussion, keyboards, trumpet, banja
- Amy Domingues - cello on "Conceptual Separation of Self"

Production

- Faraquet – production
- J. Robbins – production, engineering
- Don Zientara – engineering
- Alan Douches (of West West Side Music) - mastering
