= Verbow =

American alternative rock band

- Verbow in a 1997 promotional photo for the Chronicles album

Background information
- Origin: Chicago, Illinois, USA
- Genres: Alternative rock
- Years active: 1993 – 2003
- Labels: Whitehouse; Epic
- Spinoffs: Rockets Over Sweden
- Past members: Jason Narducy, Alison Chesley, Luke Rothschild, Mark Doyle, Lennie Dietsch, David Suycott, Randy Morris

Verbow was an American alternative rock band formed in Chicago and active between the mid-1990s and early 2000s. The band's sound was distinguished by emotionally direct songwriting and their unconventional use of cello.

== History ==
=== Early period: Jason & Alison ===
The band grew out of a collaboration between Jason Narducy and Alison Chesley. They billed themselves as Jason & Alison, with Narducy singing and playing acoustic guitar while Chesley played cello. In describing their musical approach, Narducy said, "We basically took two wooden instruments and presented them in a very loud wall-of-sound way." In 1994, the duo released the album Woodshed on the independent Whitehouse Records label. Over the next year, they were profiled in Billboard Magazine, and opened for nationally known artists such as Bob Mould (of Sugar and Hüsker Dü) and Live.

After Woodshed, they brought in a drummer and bassist, and started using more electric instrumentation. The band began performing under the name Skinny, which they later changed to Verbow to avoid potential legal issues with another band named Skinny.

=== Major label era and later years ===
Verbow signed to Epic Records and released Chronicles in 1997. The album was recorded by Bob Mould and featured Luke Rothschild on bass and Mark Doyle on drums. The song "Holiday" was promoted as a single, and was released as an EP with two newly recorded, non-album tracks.

In 2000, the band released White Out. The title refers to a blizzard that happened during the recording sessions, which took place in a rented vacation home on the shores of Lake Michigan. David Suycott (Stabbing Westward, Spies Who Surf) played drums on the album, and bass guitars were played by Rothschild and Lennie Dietsch. Most of the album was produced by Brad Wood, known for his work with Liz Phair. "New History" was remixed by Chris Lord-Alge for a promotional single. A three-song EP for "New History" was also released.

Epic Records dropped Verbow following the release of White Out. Alison Chesley amicably left the band in March 2001. Verbow officially dissolved in early 2003.

=== Reunion shows and live album ===
On May 15, 2010, Verbow played a "one night only" reunion show in Chicago. The lineup consisted of Narducy, Chesley, Suycott, and Dietsch. Three days later, Verbow released Live at Schubas, a compilation of live performances from 1998 and 2001. In an interview that month, Narducy said that he enjoyed revisiting the songs with his former bandmates. While he has no plans to revive Verbow as a full-time band, he didn't rule out future work.

On January 22, 2011, Narducy and Chesley played their first show in ten years as an acoustic duo, under the billing "Verbow (Jason & Alison) Acoustic".

=== After Verbow ===
Former Verbow members Jason Narducy and David Suycott were in the band Rockets Over Sweden, which was active between 2003 and 2006.

Jason Narducy has played bass guitar in the touring bands for several artists, including Liz Phair, Bob Mould, Robert Pollard, Superchunk, and Telekinesis and most recently, guitar in Sunny Day Real Estate. He currently has a solo project called Split Single.

Alison Chesley has performed solo under the name Helen Money. In 2007, she released her debut album Helen Money and served as composer in residence for Mordine and Co. Dance Theater. Her second album, In Tune, was released in 2009.

== Critical reaction ==
- "The duo radiated an electric confidence that elicited a fervent response from the capacity audience... It was a tough act to follow, even for a legendary figure such as [Bob] Mould." - Chicago Tribune
- "Bittersweet guitar pop in the grand tradition of Big Star and Sugar... Verbow makes a rich, emotionally textured acoustic/electric noise... The airwaves can always use literate, heartfelt rock songs (maybe now more than ever), and 'New History' is that in spades." - Billboard

== Discography ==
=== Studio albums ===
- Woodshed (as Jason & Alison) (Whitehouse, 1994)
- Chronicles (Epic, 1997)
- White Out (Epic, 2000)

=== Compilations ===
- Demos and Live Tracks (Aware, 2001)
- Bootleg Volume II (Aware, 2002)
- Live at Shubas (2010)

=== Singles and EPs ===
- "Holiday" (5-song EP) (Epic, 1997)
- "New History" (remix single) (Epic, 2000)
- "New History" (3-song EP) (Epic, 2000)

=== Appearances on various artist compilations ===
- Come in 773! (Whitehouse, 1997) - features the track "Come In Threes" by Jason & Alison
