= White Out (album) =

Studio album by Verbow
- Released: 2000
- Label: 550 Music
- Producer: Brad Wood, Jason Narducy

Verbow chronology
New History EP (2000)	White Out (2000)	Demos and Live Tracks (2001)

White Out is the second and final studio album by the American band Verbow, released in 2000. The band broke up two years later. The album's first single was "New History". Verbow supported the album by touring with Counting Crows.

== Production ==
The album was produced primarily by Brad Wood. It was recorded over five weeks in northwestern Indiana, in a house along Lake Michigan; the title refers to weather conditions that trapped the band in the studio. The band's sound focused on Jason Narducy's guitar work and, especially, Alison Chesley's cello playing. Lennie Dietsch played bass on some tracks. Several songs touch on themes of renewal and change.

== Critical reception ==
Professional ratings
Review scores
Source	Rating
AllMusic	4/5 stars
Boston Herald	3/4 stars
Chicago Sun-Times	2/4 stars
Orange County Register	C−
The Republican	3/5 stars

The River Cities' Reader wrote that "Chesley's cello is frequently the band's lead instrument, and it's employed in very unusual ways, squealing and soloing on standout tracks like 'New History', 'I'll Never Live by My Father's Dreams', and 'Happy to Be Away'"; the paper listed the album as one of the best of 2000. Billboard deemed "New History" "bittersweet guitar pop in the grand tradition of Big Star and Sugar." The Chicago Tribune considered the album to be "one of 2000's most sublime recordings," and praised the "literate, angular-melodic songs." The Orange County Register likened the album to "Collective Soul with classicism."

The Daily Herald called White Out "a richly melodic rock album that is louder and more sonically textured than most records that capitalize on heavily layered guitars... Instead of ending up lost amid all that buzzing, the melancholia of Narducy's lyrics is deepened by Chesley's somber and burrowing string work." Newsday concluded that "the rich sound of Verbow's second album-high-pitched vocals, fast-strummed acoustic guitars, heavy drumbeats and that persistent cello in criss-crossing tug-of-war games-never gets around to imitating anybody in particular." The Chicago Sun-Times noted that "Verbow too often finds itself mired in the same mid-tempo rhythm, and too often obsessed with songs' subtle filigrees at the expense of solid foundations."

AllMusic wrote that "Narducy's vocals cut right through all the madness, a good contrast to the elegant musicianship... And playing rock this hard 'elegantly' is not easy."

== Track listing ==
No.	Title	Length
1.	"Dying Sun"
2.	"New History"
3.	"I'll Never Live by My Father's Dreams"
4.	"Sweet Felicity"
5.	"Happy to Be Away"
6.	"Closer to Free"
7.	"Ambulance"
8.	"Garden"
9.	"Four Channel Town"
10.	"Corner Bending"
11.	"Be Someone"
12.	"Crest of Mary"
