= Jason Narducy =

American musician

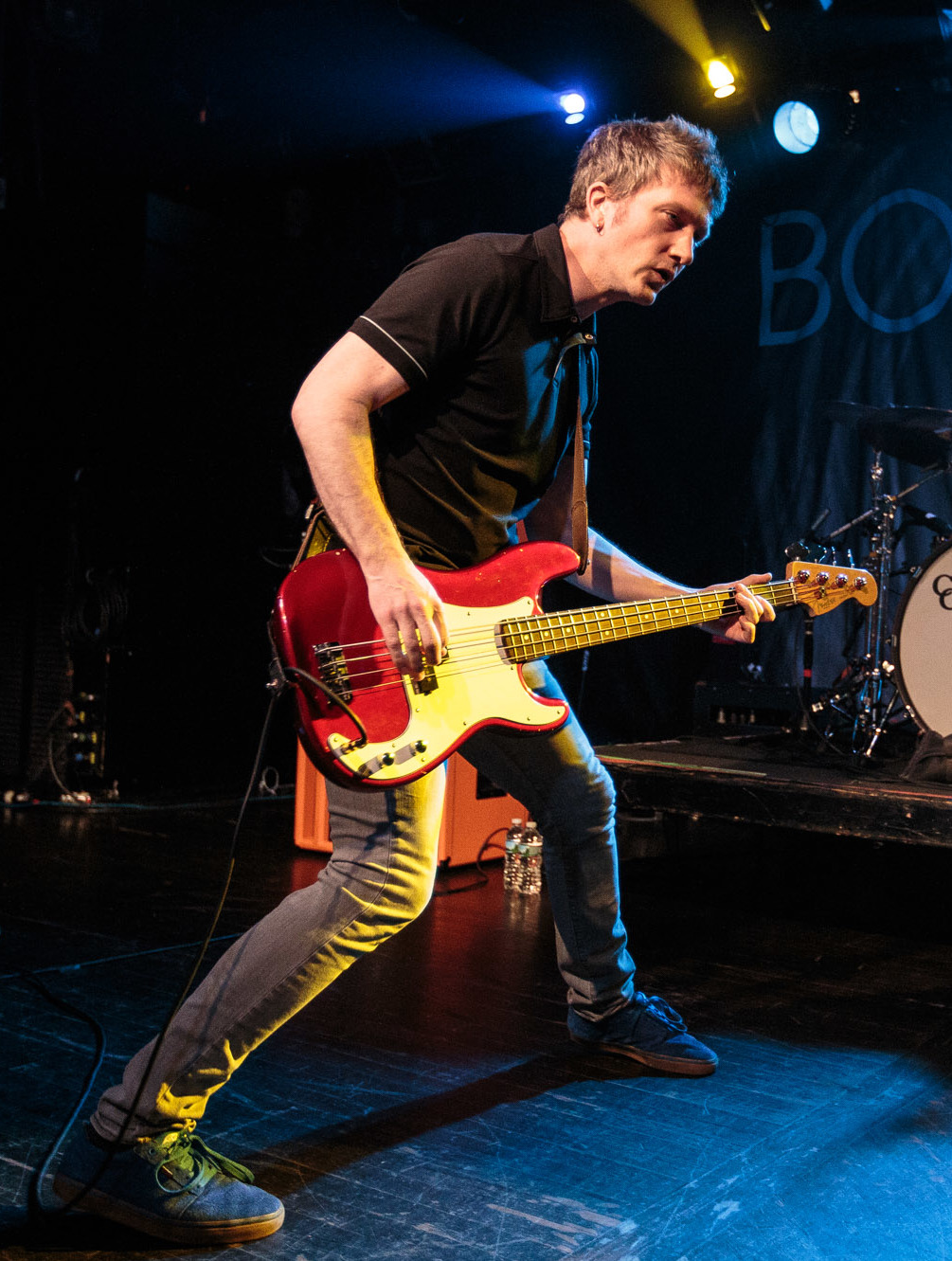
- Narducy in 2016

Background information
- Origin: Evanston, Illinois, United States
- Member of: Split Single; Bob Mould Band; Superchunk (touring)
- Formerly of: Verbow
- Website: splitsingle.bandcamp.com

Jason V. Narducy is an American musician from Evanston, Illinois, United States.

After receiving a mandolin at the age of 7, and his first guitar at age nine, Narducy started his music career playing guitar and writing songs for his punk rock band Verböten. Verböten is credited as inspiring Dave Grohl to pursue music, and Narducy is featured in the Foo Fighters HBO documentary Sonic Highways.

After college, he formed an acoustic duo with cellist Alison Chesley called Jason & Alison. They released the full-length album Woodshed in 1994. Jason & Alison became a four-piece rock band called Verbow in 1996, adding drums and bass. Narducy was lead singer, guitarist, and songwriter on Verbow's two full-length albums released on Epic Records: Chronicles (1997) and White Out (2000).

In 1999, Narducy sang a duet with jazz singer/pianist Patricia Barber on her Blue Note Records debut, Companion. Verbow went on hiatus in 2002. Narducy formed the band Rockets Over Sweden which released an EP in 2004 titled Penny Coliseum. Verbow celebrated the release of Live At Schubas in 2010 with a sold-out reunion show in Chicago.

In 2005, Narducy began touring with Bob Mould (Hüsker Dü, Sugar) as bassist and backing vocalist. Narducy has since joined Mould in the studio and performed on Mould's last six albums: Silver Age, Beauty & Ruin, Patch the Sky, Sunshine Rock, Blue Hearts, and Here We Go Crazy. In June 2013, Narducy began touring with Superchunk, filling in for bassist Laura Ballance as she deals with hyperacusis. He also played bass and sang backing vocals with Robert Pollard (Guided By Voices), Boston Spaceships, Eddie Vedder, Liz Phair, and The Pretenders.

Narducy's current solo project is Split Single. Split Single released its debut record, Fragmented World, on April 1, 2014, with Britt Daniel playing bass guitar and Jon Wurster on drums. In 2016, Split Single released its second album, Metal Frames, this time featuring Wurster and Wilco's John Stirratt on bass. A third album, Amplificado, featuring Wurster and R.E.M.'s Mike Mills on bass and backing vocals, followed in 2021.

In 2022, Narducy announced that he would be touring with the emo band Sunny Day Real Estate on their 2022 reunion tour, playing guitar and providing backup vocals. In 2024, Narducy toured with Michael Shannon, performing R.E.M. songs, including their album Murmur in its entirety.
