= Sunshine Rock =

2019 album by Bob Mould

Studio album by Bob Mould
- Released: February 8, 2019
- Studio: Tiny Telephone, Oakland & San Francisco; Additional Recording at Granary Music, San Francisco & Berlin
- Genre: Alternative rock
- Length: 36:28
- Label: Merge
- Producer: Bob Mould

Bob Mould chronology
Patch the Sky (2016)	Sunshine Rock (2019)	Blue Hearts (2020)

Sunshine Rock is the 13th solo album from American rock musician Bob Mould, formerly frontman of the bands Hüsker Dü and Sugar. The album release was announced on October 24, 2018. The album was released on February 8, 2019, and debuted at number 192 on the US Billboard 200.

== Critical reception ==
Professional ratings
Aggregate scores
Source	Rating
Metacritic	82/100
Review scores
Source	Rating
AllMusic	4/5 stars
Chicago Tribune	3/4 stars
Consequence of Sound	B
Consumer Guide	A-
DIY	4/5 stars
Rolling Stone	4/5 stars

A review in Dagger said, "'I Fought' has all the rage and bluster that Husker Du ever had (same with the great 'Sin King') while 'Camp Sunshine' is, dare I say a flowery love song... Sunshine Rock shows Bob and his unbeatable rhythm section at the top of their game." Robert Christgau wrote that "this is the first time the solo Mould has come close to what he was once capable of, and that he's managed it this late should encourage us all."

== Track listing ==
All tracks are written by Bob Mould, otherwise noted.

No.	Title	Writer(s)	Length
1.	"Sunshine Rock"		3:09
2.	"What Do You Want Me to Do"		2:31
3.	"Sunny Love Song"		3:00
4.	"Thirty Dozen Roses"		2:53
5.	"The Final Years"		3:25
6.	"Irrational Poison"		2:51
7.	"I Fought"		2:36
8.	"Sin King"		3:53
9.	"Lost Faith"		3:21
10.	"Camp Sunshine"		3:04
11.	"Send Me a Postcard"	Robbie van Leeuwen	2:35
12.	"Western Sunset"		3:20
Total length:			36:28

== Personnel ==
- Bob Mould – guitars, vocals, keyboards, percussion, production, orchestral arrangements
- Jason Narducy – bass, backing vocals
- Jon Wurster – drums, percussion
- Alison Chesley – cello on "Western Sunset", orchestral score transcriptions
- Czech Studio Orchestra – cellos, violas, violins
- Paul Martens – transcription consultant
- Mikel Toms – orchestra conductor
- Jan Košulič – orchestra engineer

== Charts ==
Chart (2019)	Peak position
Belgian Albums (Ultratop Flanders)	194
Scottish Albums (OCC)	19
UK Independent Albums (OCC)	5
US Billboard 200	192
US Independent Albums (Billboard)	4
US Top Alternative Albums (Billboard)	16
US Top Rock Albums (Billboard)	36
US Vinyl Albums (Billboard)	5
