= Amy Domingues =

American viola da gamba player and cellist

Amy Domingues (born 1973) is an American viola da gamba player and cellist (baroque and modern).

== Biography ==
She earned her master's degree in Early Music at Peabody Conservatory. In August 2014, Domingues traveled to Venice, Italy at the invitation of the Venice Opera Project to play continuo in their inaugural season.

In addition to her early music activities, Domingues maintains a large teaching studio and performs on amplified viola da gamba with multi-instrumentalist Dennis Kane as the duo Domingues & Kane. She is also an active cellist, composer, and teacher in the Washington, D.C. area. Her soundtrack compositions can be heard in the score to 2003’s Academy Award-nominated documentary film The Weather Underground. She has released three cello-oriented rock albums under the name Garland of Hours, in addition to her contributions as a recording artist on over fifty rock, pop, and classical albums.

== Collaborations ==
She has performed with the Washington Bach Consort, The Folger Consort, the National Philharmonic, Hesperus, Sonnambula (NYC), Faraquet, and is a founding member of Corda Nova Baroque. She has performed in masterclasses with Wieland Kuijken, Philippe Pierlot and Paolo Pandolfo.

== Rock/Indie Music Collaborations ==
Amy Domingues has contributed cello to albums by [Fugazi], Bob Mould, Ted Leo, Jenny Toomey, Mary Timony, and Benjy Ferree. She released three albums as a singer-songwriter/cellist under the name Garland of Hours with collaborators Mary Timony, Jerry Busher, and Brendan Canty.

== Awards ==
She is a multiple recipient of the Washington DC Commission on the Arts and Humanities Fellowship Grant, the Peabody Career Development Grant and the Young Artist's Grant-in-Aid (from the Viola da Gamba Society of America).
