= Bob Mould =

American musician

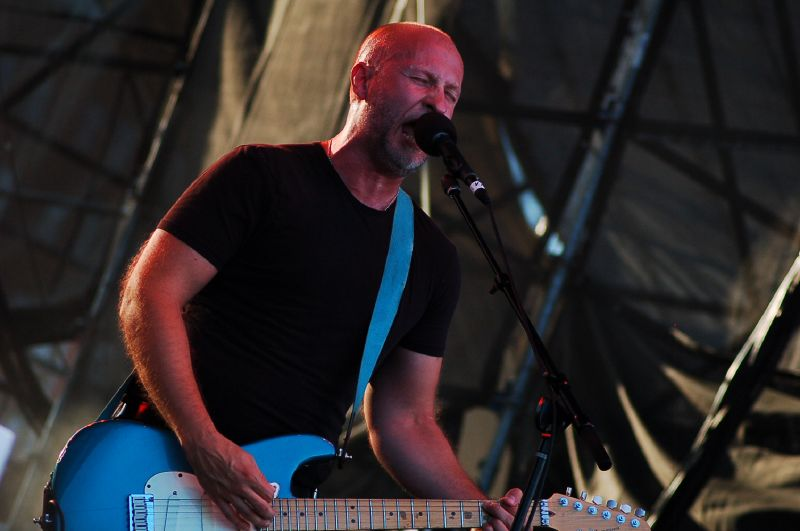
- Mould performing live in 2005

Background information
- Born: Robert Arthur Mould; October 16, 1960 (age 66); Malone, New York, US
- Genres: Punk rock; alternative rock
- Occupations: Musician; producer; singer; songwriter; dramatist; disc jockey
- Instruments: Guitar; vocals; keyboards; bass; percussion
- Years active: 1979–present
- Labels: Merge; Creation; Granary; Full Frequency; New Alliance; Reflex, Restless; Rhino; Rough Trade; Rykodisc; SOL; SST; Virgin; Warner Bros.; Yep Roc; Omnivore; Demon
- Member of: Sugar
- Formerly of: Hüsker Dü; Blowoff
- Website: bobmould.com

Robert Arthur Mould (born October 16, 1960) is an American musician, principally known for his work as guitarist, vocalist, and songwriter for alternative rock bands Hüsker Dü in the 1980s and Sugar in the 1990s.

== Early years ==
Mould was born on October 16, 1960, in Malone, New York. He first started playing guitar in 1976 after being inspired by the Ramones. He said he "figured that if they could do it, anybody could." Mould lived in several places, including the Minneapolis-St. Paul area, where he attended Macalester College in Saint Paul. At Macalester, he formed Hüsker Dü in the late 1970s with drummer/singer Grant Hart and bass guitarist Greg Norton. Mould and Hart were the principal songwriters for Hüsker Dü.

== Musical career ==
=== Hüsker Dü ===
Forming in 1979, Hüsker Dü first gained notice as a punk rock group with a series of recordings on the independent label SST Records. In 1986, they signed with a major record label (Warner Bros. Records), but found only modest commercial success. However, they were later often cited as one of the key influences on 1990s alternative rock, including bands such as Foo Fighters and Pixies.

In the late 1980s, Hüsker Dü broke up acrimoniously amid members' drug abuse, personal problems, disputes over songwriting credits, musical direction, and the suicide of the band's manager, David Savoy. Mould and Hart played together only once after the breakup; at a 2004 benefit concert for an ailing friend, the late Karl Mueller of Soul Asylum, they played "Hardly Getting Over It" and "Never Talking to You Again."

=== First solo period (1988–1991) ===
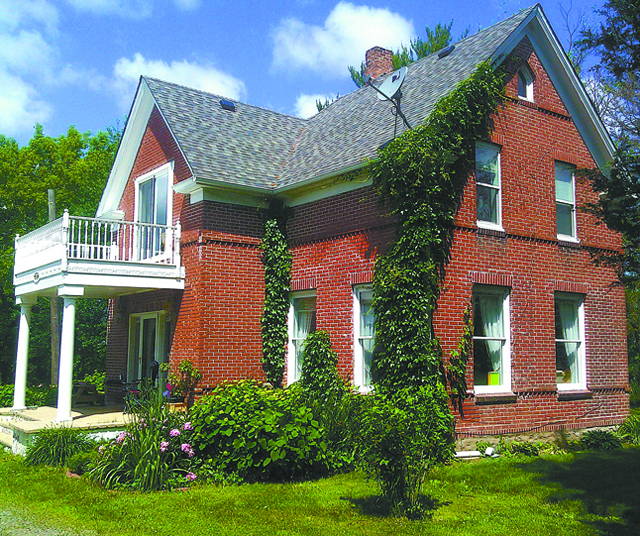
Farmhouse in Pine City, Minnesota, where Mould sequestered himself to write his first solo album, Workbook

Just before Hüsker Dü broke up, Mould moved to a remote farmhouse in Pine City, Minnesota, having quit drinking and drugs, and wrote the songs that would make up his first solo album. Released by the newly formed Virgin Records America label, 1989's Workbook eschewed Mould's trademark wall-of-noise guitar for a lighter tone. Drummer Anton Fier (of the Feelies and later the Golden Palominos) and bassist Tony Maimone (of Pere Ubu) served as Mould's rhythm section. The album peaked at number 127 on the Billboard 200 chart, and the single "See a Little Light" reached number 4 on the Billboard Modern Rock Tracks chart.

His 1990 album Black Sheets of Rain had a much heavier guitar sound, recalling Hüsker Dü's louder, angrier moments. According to the liner notes for the 2012 re-release of Sugar's Copper Blue, Creation Records president Alan McGee verified that total album sales were 7,000 copies. Still, the album peaked at number 123 on the Billboard 200 chart, and the single "It's Too Late" reached number 10 on the Billboard Modern Rock Tracks chart.

Mould also co-founded a record label, Singles Only Label, with Coyote Records label founder Steve Fallon. The label released singles from bands such as Daniel Johnston, Grant Lee Buffalo, Moby, Mojo Nixon, Morphine, Nikki Sudden, and R. Stevie Moore from 1989 to 1994.

=== Sugar (1992–1995) ===
Mould then formed the group Sugar, with bassist David Barbe and drummer Malcolm Travis. Along with extensive touring, Sugar released two albums, an EP and a B-sides collection before breaking up in early 1995. Copper Blue (1992) was named as NME's 1992 Album of the Year, and was Mould's most successful commercial album, selling nearly 300,000 copies.

While in the band Sugar, in 1993 he contributed the track "Can't Fight It" as a solo artist to the AIDS Benefit Album No Alternative produced by the Red Hot Organization. In 1994, he recorded "Turning of the Tide" for Beat The Retreat, a tribute album to the English guitarist and songwriter Richard Thompson.

=== Second solo period (1996–present) ===
In 1996, Mould returned to solo recording, releasing a self-titled album in 1996 on Rykodisc, often referred to as Hubcap because of the cover photo. Mould played all of the instruments himself, and programmed the drums instead of using a real drummer. The album peaked at number 101 on the Billboard 200 chart, and number 1 on the Heatseekers chart.

In 1998, Mould released The Last Dog and Pony Show, his final album on Rykodisc (who had released all of the Sugar albums in the U.S.). The album was named as such because Mould decided that the tour that followed would be his "last electric band tour".

After the tour, Mould took a break from the music world to get involved with another passion of his, professional wrestling, when he joined WCW as a scriptwriter in 1999 for a brief period. Creative differences with some of the other writers led to Mould's leaving the company and returning to music. The liner notes for the 2002 album Modulate thank some of the wrestlers he associated with, most notably Kevin Nash and Kevin Sullivan.

During a stint living in New York City in the late-1990s, as he more fully embraced his identity as a gay man, Mould's tastes took a detour into dance music and electronica. Those influences were clear on his 2002 release Modulate, which featured a strong electronica influence to mixed critical reviews and poor fan reaction. One song, "The Receipt", was fairly straightforward, according to City Pages: it "can be taken as a barely veiled attack on Mould's old Husker Dü-mate Grant Hart." (In fact, another song on the album ["Trade"] had been written and performed live during his Hüsker Dü days.) In further pursuit of this sound, Mould also began recording under the pseudonym LoudBomb (an anagram of his name), releasing one CD ("Long Playing Grooves") so far under this name.

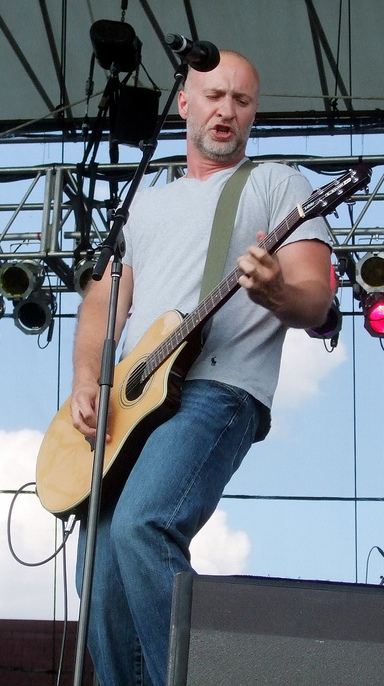
Mould at McCarren Park Pool in July 2007.

His next solo album, Body of Song, had been originally scheduled to closely follow the release of 2002's Modulate. Instead, Mould worked on the album for the next three years, resulting in a 2005 release. By this time, he had changed his mind on touring with a band, and announced his first band tour since 1998. The tour lineup included bassist Jason Narducy (of Verbow), drummer Brendan Canty (of Fugazi), and Mould's Blowoff collaborator, Morel, on keyboards.

In addition to his solo work, Mould also worked as a live DJ in collaboration with Washington DC-area dance music artist Richard Morel, under the collective banner Blowoff. They frequently staged at the 9:30 Club in Washington, D.C. A Blowoff CD was released in September 2006, consisting of songs recorded together by the two. Mould has also done remixes for a variety of dance and alternative rock artists, including a remix of the Interpol song "Length of Love".

District Line was released February 5, 2008. A little over a year later, on April 7, 2009, Mould released his next album entitled Life and Times in the midst of researching his life for an autobiography.

Mould ultimately wrote that memoir with Michael Azerrad, the author of Our Band Could Be Your Life and Come as You Are: The Story of Nirvana. The book, See a Little Light: The Trail of Rage and Melody, was published in June 2011.

On August 6, 2012, Mould released the first single from his first album on Merge Records, Silver Age, on September 4, 2012. It peaked at No. 52 on the Billboard 200 album chart, No. 12 on the Alternative Albums chart, and No. 3 on the Tastemaker Albums chart. In 2014 Mould released Beauty & Ruin and in March 2016, his album Patch the Sky was released.

On October 25, 2018, Mould shared a new song, "Sunshine Rock" from his new album of the same name, arriving February 8, 2019, via Merge Records

On June 3, 2020, Mould released a new song "American Crisis" the lead single from his album Blue Hearts, released on September 25.

On January 8, 2025, he announced a new album, Here We Go Crazy, coming out on March 7, and released the title track as its first single. He will be touring throughout the United States in support of the album.

In October 2025, Mould stated he would be reforming Sugar with Barbe and Travis with plans to gig in London and New York in May 2026.

=== Instruments ===
As a member of Hüsker Dü, Mould was known for playing Flying V–style guitars, mainly an Ibanez Rocket Roll Jr.

In 1988, Mould bought a blue Fender American Standard Stratocaster off the rack after playing it "for about 15 seconds, unplugged". The Stratocaster has been his electric guitar of choice since the breakup of Hüsker Dü around that time. The acoustic guitar he has used over many years is a 12-string Yamaha APX.

== Collaborations ==
Mould has made various guest appearances throughout his career. In 1984, Mould played piano on Ground Zero's album Ground Zero. In 1991, Mould sang and played guitar on the Golden Palominos album Drunk with Passion on the song "Dying from the Inside Out". In 1992, he contributed vocals to the song "Dio" on the Throwing Muses album Red Heaven. Mould performed the guitars for the soundtrack for the film version of Hedwig and the Angry Inch, released in 1999. In 2000, Mould sang "He Didn't" (written by Stephin Merritt) on the 6ths' album Hyacinths and Thistles. He also contributed vocals to the 2009 Fucked Up cover of "Do They Know It's Christmas?"

In 2011, Mould performed on the Foo Fighters album Wasting Light, contributing guitar and vocals to the track "Dear Rosemary". He made sporadic appearances with the band during their Wasting Light tour to perform the song on stage, including on the Conan O'Brien show. In December 2017, Mould opened for the Foo Fighters in four states during their Concrete and Gold tour.

== Granary Music ==
Granary Music is the independent record label and publishing company operated by Mould. As a record label, its only artists are Mould himself, his former band Sugar, and his electronic dance music side project Loudbomb. Under the Granary name, Mould controls the master rights to the entire Sugar discography, and all of the solo work he has recorded since Sugar's breakup in 1995. Most of these masters have been leased through Granary to other labels, including Rykodisc and Yep Roc; however, Mould released his 2002 solo album Modulate and the Loudbomb CD directly through Granary. Granary also controls the publishing rights to all of Mould's compositions, including all of the songs he wrote and performed with Hüsker Dü, which he claimed after the band's own publishing partnership was disbanded in 1988.

Granary is also the name used to refer to Mould's home studio, first used in NYC for parts of The Last Dog and Pony Show and for Modulate. When he moved to Washington, D.C., Mould moved the studio and label along with him and recorded most of the basics (save for live drums) for his 2005 Body of Song there.

== Personal life ==
Mould is gay. Though his sexual orientation had previously been an open secret, he was outed in the early 1990s in an interview in the music magazine Spin. Since then, Mould has been cited as a musical and social influence among other openly gay musicians. "Hüsker Dü changed my life. That was a huge influence on me," said Steve Brooks of Torche. "Before Rob Halford came out, there was Bob Mould. He wasn't very vocal about it, but I'm a big fan of his music. It was comforting — one of my favorite musicians was 'a gay!' Kick ass."

In April 2004, Mould was a co-organizer of the WEDRock benefit concert for Freedom to Marry. "WedRock" was a play on the word "wedlock". The event raised an estimated US$30,000. Mould also contributed the song "See a Little Light" to the 2006 album Wed-Rock: A Benefit for Freedom to Marry, an album to support in the legalization of same-sex marriage.

In interviews to promote his 2019 album Sunshine Rock, Mould revealed that he had been residing in Berlin, Germany, since 2015. As of 2020, he splits his time between San Francisco and Palm Springs, California. In San Francisco, he specifically lives in the Castro District, famously known as San Francisco's gay neighborhood.

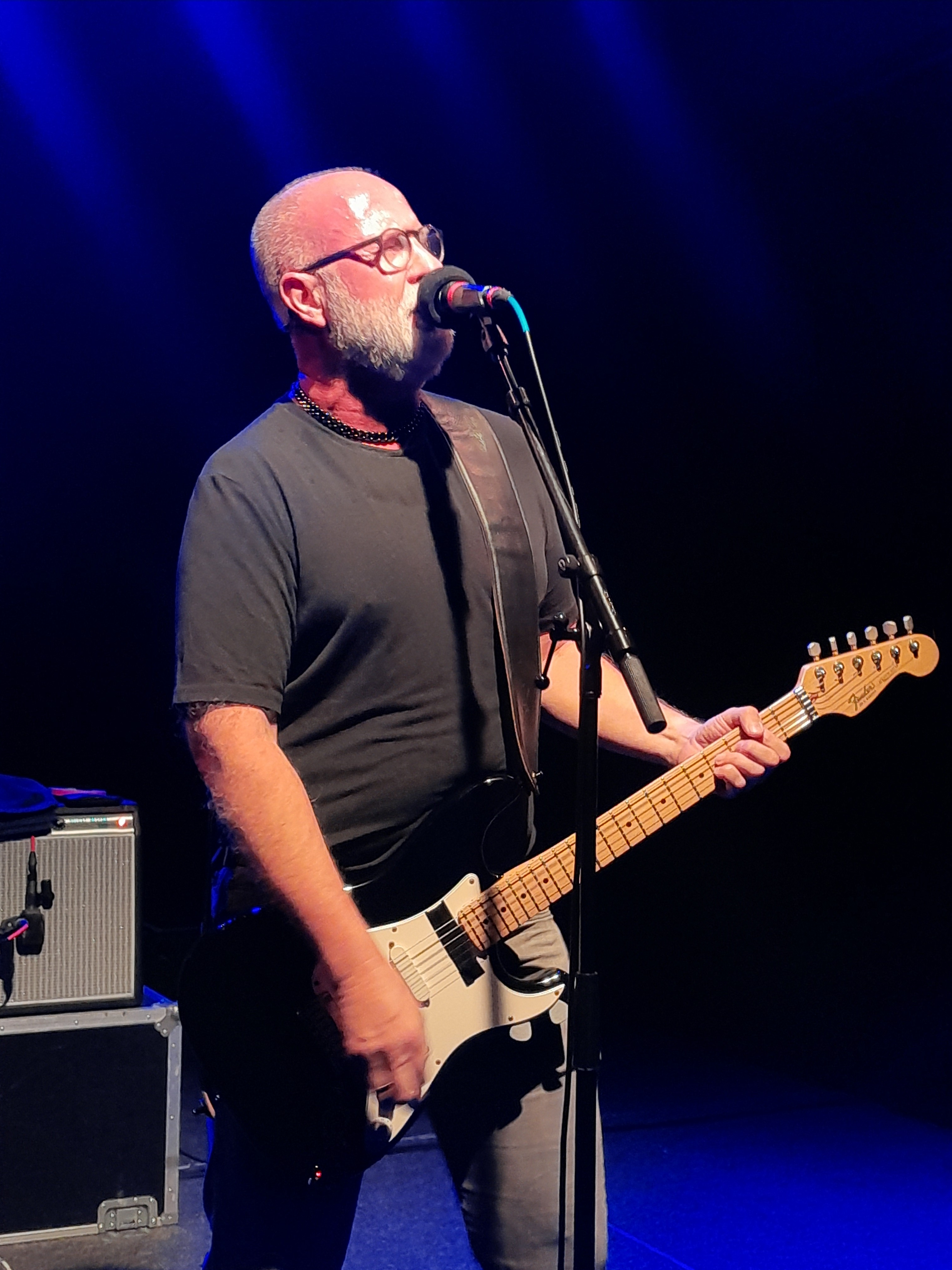
Mould performing in Lyttelton, New Zealand, November 2024

Mould is married to Don Fisher.

== In popular culture ==
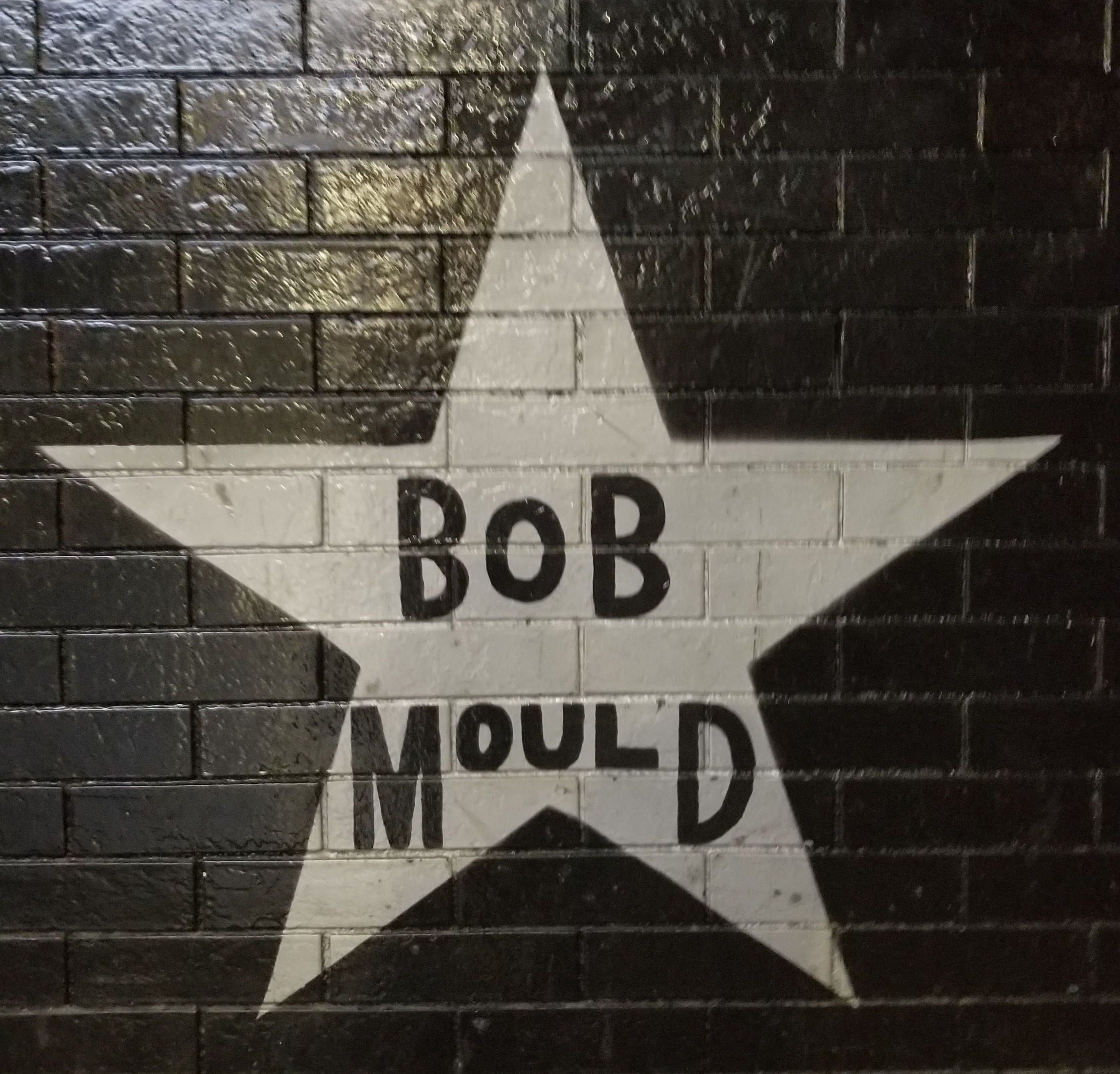
Mould's star on the outside mural of the Minneapolis nightclub First Avenue

Mould's song "Dog on Fire" is the theme song for The Daily Show. He originally wrote the track for his third solo album, but cut it as redundant. The name was picked by mastering engineer Jim Wilson from an offhand comment Mould made in an interview. They Might Be Giants performed updated versions which were used in the 2000s, and the song was later remixed by Timbaland when Trevor Noah took over as host. On December 19, 1996, Mould made a cameo appearance on The Daily Show Holiday Spectacular in an homage duet of "The Little Drummer Boy" with Mould playing the part of David Bowie to Craig Kilborn's "Bing Crosby".

The song "See a Little Light" has been used more than once in various television applications: It was used in the closing scene of the original un-aired test pilot episode of Buffy the Vampire Slayer, it was also used in the closing scene of the season 1 finale for 13 Reasons Why, it became one of the principal theme songs for the HBO series The Mind of the Married Man and was also used in a television commercial for TIAA-CREF (August 2007). Mould also composed the theme for the TLC program, In a Fix.

In 2011, Mould wrote his autobiography See a Little Light with Michael Azerrad.

In 2001, Mould played lead guitar in the house band for the film of John Cameron Mitchell's Hedwig and the Angry Inch (musical), and on the film's soundtrack. In 2003, Mould also participated in a Hedwig tribute album, Wig in a Box, on which he covered the song "Nailed".

On September 29, 2005, Mould's song "Circles" was included on the TV series The O.C.

Mould appeared on an episode of Independent Film Channel's The Henry Rollins Show on June 15, 2007.

On November 21, 2011, musicians such as Dave Grohl, Britt Daniel and Jessica Dobson of Spoon, Craig Finn and Tad Kubler of The Hold Steady, Randy Randall and Dean Allen Spunt of No Age, Margaret Cho, Jason Narducy, Jon Wurster of Superchunk, and Ryan Adams came together at the Walt Disney Concert Hall and played songs from Mould's career. During the concert, Mould discussed his then-forthcoming album Silver Age, involving Jason Narducy and drummer Jon Wurster (of Superchunk), and a limited tour of Sugar's debut album Copper Blue.

Mould has been honored with two stars on the outside mural of the Minneapolis nightclub First Avenue, one for his solo work and one for Hüsker Dü. The stars recognize performers that have played sold-out shows or have otherwise demonstrated a major contribution to the culture at the iconic venue. Receiving a star "might be the most prestigious public honor an artist can receive in Minneapolis", according to journalist Steve Marsh.

Mould's 2014 song 'I Don't Know You Anymore' serves as the theme music for the Section 10 Podcast. The podcast originally used a cover version performed by Josh Kantor, the longtime organist at Fenway Park. This was later replaced by a rendition of the song performed by a fan of the podcast.

== Discography ==
Bob Mould discography
- Studio albums: 15
- Live albums: 2
- Compilation albums: 2
- Singles: 14
- Music videos: 2

=== Studio albums ===
Year	Information	Chart positions			
Year	Information	US	US Heat.	US Ind.	UK
1989	Workbook^{[A]}: Label: Virgin; Released: April 1989	127	–	–	–
1990	Black Sheets of Rain: Label: Virgin; Released: May 1990	123	–	–	–
1996	Bob Mould: Labels: Creation, Rykodisc; Released: April 30, 1996	101	1	–	52
1998	The Last Dog and Pony Show: Labels: Creation, Rykodisc; Released: August 25, 1998	164	11	–	58
2002	Modulate: Labels: Cooking Vinyl, Granary Music; Released: March 12, 2002	–	45	18	–
2002	Long Playing Grooves (as 'LoudBomb'): Labels: Cooking Vinyl, Granary Music; Released: 2002	–	–	–	–
2005	Body of Song: Labels: Cooking Vinyl, Yep Roc; Released: July 12, 2005	–	22	37	–
2006	Blowoff (with 'Blowoff'): Label: Full Frequency Music; Released: September 5, 2006	–	–	–	–
2008	District Line: Labels: Anti-, Beggars Banquet; Released: February 5, 2008	191	5	24	–
2009	Life and Times: Label: Anti-; Released: April 7, 2009	–	7	–	–
2012	Silver Age: Labels: Edsel, Merge; Released: September 4, 2012	52	–	13	–
2014	Beauty & Ruin: Label: Merge; Released: June 3, 2014	38	–	5	96
2016	Patch the Sky: Label: Merge; Released: March 25, 2016	82	–	6	54
2019	Sunshine Rock: Label: Merge; Released: February 8, 2019	192	–	–	–
2020	Blue Hearts: Label: Merge; Released: September 25, 2020	181	–	–	–
2025	Here We Go Crazy: Label: Granary Music; Released: March 7, 2025				

Notes

- AWorkbook 25 — A remastered version of Workbook including a second disc of live versions of the songs recorded after the original release in 1989 was released in 2014.

=== Compilations and live albums ===
- Poison Years (1994, Virgin)
- Live Dog '98 (2002, Granary Music) (released under the name 'Bob Mould Band')
- Live at ATP 2008 (2009, Granary Music) (released under the name 'Bob Mould Band')
- Bob Mould + The Last Dog And Pony Show + LiveDog98 (2012, Edsel)
- Distortion: 1989-2019 (Series of boxsets released 2020-2021, Demon Records / Edsel)

=== Singles ===
- "See a Little Light" (1989) No. 4 US Modern Rock Songs
- "It's Too Late" (1990) No. 10 Modern Rock Songs
- "Egøverride" (1996)
- "Fort Knox, King Solomon" (1996)
- "Classifieds"/"Moving Trucks" (1998)
- "Soundonsound" (2002)
- "Paralyzed" (2005)
- "The Silence Between Us" (2008)
- "I'm Sorry, Baby, But You Can't Stand in My Light Anymore" (2009)
- "The Descent" (2012)
- "I Don't Know You Anymore" (2014)
- "Hold On" (2016)
- "Voices in My Head" (2016)
- "Sunshine Rock" (2018)
- "What Do You Want Me to Do" (2018)
- "Lost Faith" (2019)
- "American Crisis" (2020)
- "Siberian Butterfly" (2020)
- "Here We Go Crazy" (2025)

=== Videos ===
- Circle of Friends (2007, MVD Visual)
- See a Little Light: A Celebration of the Music and Legacy of Bob Mould (2013)

=== Contributions ===
Various artist compilations including individual tracks by Mould:

- No Alternative (1994) – includes "Can't Fight It"
- Beat the Retreat: Songs by Richard Thompson (1994) – includes "Turning of the Tide" by Richard Thompson, performed by Mould
- Wig in a Box (2003) – includes "Nailed"
- Wed-Rock: A Benefit for Freedom To Marry (2006) – includes "If I Can't Change Your Mind (acoustic)"
- 30 Days, 50 Songs (2016) - includes "In a Free Land (live)"

== Bands produced ==
- Man Sized Action, Claustrophobia
- Soul Asylum, Say What You Will... and Made to Be Broken
- Articles of Faith, Give Thanks and In This Life
- Magnapop, Hot Boxing
- Verbow, Chronicles
- The Zulus, Down on the Floor
- Friction Wheel, Something Tells Me/Won't Fall Down – SOL
- Impaler, If We Had Brains... We'd Be Dangerous
- Low, Tonight the Monkeys Die Remixes EP
- Half a Chicken, Food For Thought
- Starfish, Stellar Sonic Solutions
- Titus Andronicus, An Obelisk
