= Faraquet =

American post-hardcore band

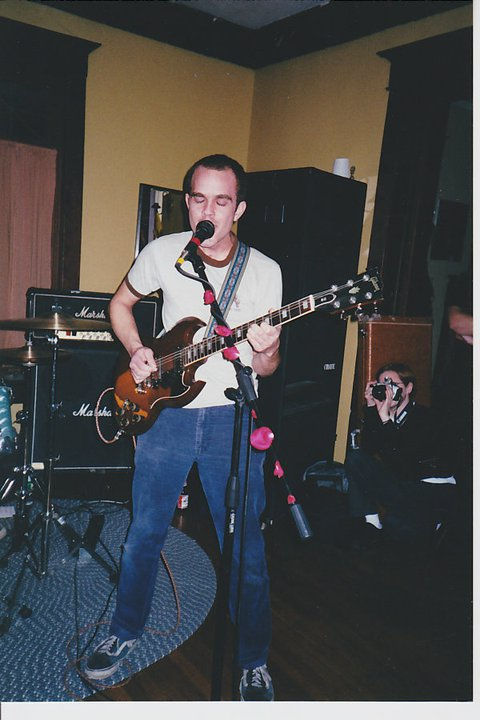
- Faraquet live in Indianapolis in the early 2000s

Background information
- Origin: Washington, D.C., U.S.
- Genres: Post-hardcore; math rock
- Years active: 1997–2001, 2007–2008, 2025–present
- Labels: Dischord; DeSoto
- Members: Devin Ocampo; Chad Molter; Jeff Boswell
- Website: https://dischord.com/band/faraquet

Faraquet /ˈfærəkɛt/ is an American post-hardcore band from Washington D.C., United States, sometimes placed in the math rock genre. The trio formed in 1997 and disbanded in 2001 after releasing its debut full-length on Dischord Records. The band briefly reformed to play shows in Brazil and their native Washington, D.C. The trio reformed again in April 2025.

== History ==
Longtime friends Devin Ocampo (guitar) and Chad Molter (drums/percussion) moved from New York City to Washington, D.C. to further pursue their musical aspirations. Ocampo became the drummer for fellow D.C. band Smart Went Crazy, where Ocampo met future Faraquet bass player Jeff Boswell. Boswell joined Ocampo and Molter to form Faraquet in 1997.

Faraquet were influenced by Sonic Youth and Dinosaur Jr., as well as older rock bands such as King Crimson, Yes, and the Who.

Following Faraquet's dissolution, Molter and Ocampo went on to form Medications, which released an EP and two albums on Dischord Records before going on hiatus in 2011. Ocampo currently plays solo and released one full-length album in 2026 with Jerry Busher called Lonely Woman. Molter has a solo project called Whisper States, which released its eponymous first album in September 2024.

The band reformed in April of 2025 announcing July shows in Washington, DC, Philadelphia and New York City with the support of SAVAK. In September Faraquet played in Los Angeles followed by a week of shows in Japan. In 2026, they played seven shows in the UK and Europe.

== Personnel ==
=== Lineup ===
- Devin Ocampo: vocals, guitar, drums/percussion, keyboards, banjo, baritone guitar, trumpet.
- Chad Molter: drums/percussion, vocals, piccolo bass
- Jeff Boswell: bass, feedback guitar, Moog

== Discography ==
=== Singles ===
- Parakeet / Um Die Ecke (Mis En Scene) (1998)
- Whole Thing Over / Call It Sane (DeSoto Records) (1999)

=== EPs ===
- Akarso / faraquet Split (404 Records) (1999)

=== Albums ===
- The View from this Tower (Dischord Records) (2000)

=== Compilation albums ===
- Anthology 1997-98 (Dischord) (2008)
