= Silver Age (album) =

Studio album by Bob Mould
- Released: September 4, 2012
- Studio: Hyde Street San Francisco, California
- Genre: Alternative rock
- Length: 38:08
- Label: Merge
- Producer: Bob Mould

Bob Mould chronology
Life and Times (2009)	Silver Age (2012)	Beauty & Ruin (2014)

Professional ratings
Aggregate scores
Source	Rating
AnyDecentMusic?	7.4/10
Metacritic	80/100
Review scores
Source	Rating
AllMusic	4.5/5 stars
The A.V. Club	A−
Chicago Tribune	3.5/4 stars
The Irish Times	3/5 stars
Los Angeles Times	3.5/4 stars
Mojo	4/5 stars
Pitchfork	7.6/10
Q	4/5 stars
Rolling Stone	3/5 stars
Uncut	6/10

Silver Age is the tenth solo album from former Hüsker Dü and Sugar frontman Bob Mould. Mould was joined on bass by Jason Narducy and on drums by Superchunk's Jon Wurster.

For the release of Silver Age, the trio embarked on a series of concerts where, in addition to material from the new album and a few Hüsker Dü songs, they played the entirety of Sugar's Copper Blue in order. Copper Blue was simultaneously released in a 20th anniversary edition.

== Track listing ==
All tracks written by Bob Mould.

1. "Star Machine" - 3:25
2. "Silver Age" - 3:02
3. "The Descent" - 3:55
4. "Briefest Moment" - 3:18
5. "Steam of Hercules" - 4:17
6. "Fugue State" - 3:33
7. "Round the City Square" - 4:04
8. "Angels Rearrange" - 3:16
9. "Keep Believing" - 4:25
10. "First Time Joy" - 4:53

== Personnel ==
- Bob Mould - guitars, vocals, keyboards, producer
- Jason Narducy - bass
- Jon Wurster - drums
- Beau Sorenson - engineer
- Nathan Winter - assistant engineer
- Jim Wilson - mastering
- Nic Pope - assistant mix engineer
- Maggie Frost - artwork
- Shelly Mosman - portrait

== Charts ==
Chart (2012)	Peak position
US Billboard 200	52
US Billboard Independent Albums	13
US Billboard Top Modern Rock/Alternative Albums	12
US Billboard Top Rock Albums	19
