= Viola da Gamba Society of America =

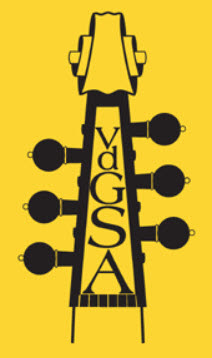
- Abbreviation: VdGSA
- Formation: 1962; 64 years ago
- Founded at: Annapolis MD, USA
- Headquarters: Minneapolis, MN
- Members: ~1100 (annual)
- President: Chrissy Spencer
- Budget: $320,000
- Staff: Entirely volunteer-run
- Website: vdgsa.org

The Viola da Gamba Society of America (VdGSA) is an organization dedicated to the viola da gamba and the support of activities that promote the instrument and spread awareness and appreciation for the instrument in the United States and abroad. The Society was founded in 1962 and as of the 2020s had grown to over 1000 individual members, consisting of players of all levels; instrument makers and restorers, music publishers and distributors; and others sharing a serious interest in music for viols and other early bowed string instruments, as well as more than 50 institutional library members. The VdGSA publishes a quarterly newsletter, an annual membership directory, and the Journal of the Viola da Gamba Society of America as well as editions of music for the instrument with a sheet music catalogue including over 200 items. Its most visible activity is an annual Conclave, held in locations which rotate across the country.

== History ==
The Viola da Gamba Society was founded in 1962 near Annapolis, Maryland by a small group of viol players and enthusiasts, who met regularly to play together at the home of George and Eloise Glenn. Initially the Society was structured as a private stock company with start-up funds for legal fees provided by the Glenns and two friends. Further shares were sold to four additional founding members. However, in 1963 when dues began to arrive, no more shares were issued, and the Society later changed to a non-profit.

The Society's first president was Karl Neumann, a Czech national who came to the United States after World War II.

As the Society has grown, local, affiliate chapters have emerged to support activities across North America. The Society currently has 21 local chapters in the US and Canada, and a longer list of somewhat less formally organized area groups with area representatives in the US, Canada, Mexico, England, Norway, Japan, Australia, and New Zealand.

== Conclave ==
The first Conclave was held on August 11, 1963 at a private home in Bay Ridge, Maryland and lasted for just one afternoon. Subsequent Conclaves in the 1960s were larger affairs which took place over the course of a weekend, first at the historic Maryland Inn in Annapolis, Maryland (1964-1968), followed by the Robert Morris Inn & Sandaway Lodge in Oxford, Maryland (1969-1971) and the Allenbury Inn in Boiling Springs, Maryland (1972-1973). As the Society grew, so did the Conclaves, both in size and duration. From 1974 on, Conclaves have been held on university campuses. Currently, Conclave is the last full week in July every summer, and the location rotates from year to year. The format for the workshop includes classes; concerts; lectures and demonstrations; a vendors' emporium featuring instruments, music, and accessories; a gala auction; and a banquet. The 50th Annual Conclave, which featured the largest number of violas da gamba ever playing together in one place, was held in 2012 at the University of Delaware and attracted over 300 participants.

Since the 50th Annual Conclave, the attendance has been steady at about 200 participants, coming from all over the US and Canada along with a healthy smattering of enthusiasts from Europe, Australia, Asia, and Latin America. Recent Conclaves have been held at Miami University in Oxford, Ohio (2014, 2017, and 2022), Western Carolina University in Cullowhee, North Carolina (2018), and Pacific University in Forest Grove, Oregon (2010, 2013, 2016, 2019, and 2024). In 2020 and 2021, due to the world-wide COVID-19 pandemic, the Society held its annual Conclaves online. The sixtieth annual Conclave was held at the end of July 2022 at Miami University in Oxford, Ohio, marking the Society's return to in-person Conclaves, after two years of online Conclaves. Over 160 participants attended in person, and a further 75 took part in the concurrent online program.

== Other activities ==
=== Outreach activities ===
The Society regularly sponsors Young Players' Weekends in different parts of the country, three-day workshops for up to about twenty attendees with two or three nationally known teachers. In support of the VdGSA's professional members and with a long-term view toward the future of teaching the viol in North America, the Society sponsored its first weekend Professional Development Initiative in 2016. The Society paid all costs, including travel stipends for attendees from across the country. Additionally, the VdGSA maintains a presence at a variety of festivals and workshops. The most of extensive of these is at the Boston Early Music Festival (BEMF) where the VdGSA presents the Gamba Gamut, a multi-set concert at the festival for which members are chosen by audition to perform a single set, as well as the Gamba Garden, an opportunity for children and others to try viols with guidance from members of the Society. Additionally, the VdGSA regularly sponsors a viola da gamba master class at the festival.

=== Grants ===
The VdGSA supports all facets of the art of the viol, and in that regard offers a range of different grants. Grants in Aid are available to individual viol players, instrument makers, researchers, or composers, who present a compelling case for their project. Through these grants the Society has helped launch the careers of viol players, for example, by helping them acquire an instrument or a bow. Other categories of grants offered by the VdGSA include Chapter Start-up Grants, to support the formation of chapters in previously underserved areas, and Workshop Grants, for which either a teacher or a group of people wanting to hire a teacher can apply to assist with the costs of presenting a workshop.

=== Viol rental programs ===
Viols of all sizes (except violone) are available to VdGSA members for one-year rentals at a reasonable fee. The society bears the cost of shipping to almost anywhere in the country. The renter pays for the return shipping. A smaller collection of viols is available to members residing in Canada. A bow and a case are included in the rental. This program allows players of any ability to try out the viol without having to purchase one.

=== Publications ===
The Viola da Gamba Society of America publishes a peer reviewed scholarly journal, a quarterly newsletter, and music for the viol.

==== Journal of the Viola da Gamba Society of America ====
The Journal of the VdGSA is a peer-reviewed journal dedicated to research on the viol and its repertoire, available in libraries on four continents. It is indexed by Répertoire International de Littérature Musicale (RILM) as a "core journal". The first issue of the Journal appeared in 1964, and new issues were published annually through 2006. Since then, the journal has been published every two years, or occasionally annually, when the volume of new research is greater. Volume 51 (2019-2020) went to press in 2020.

==== VdGSA News ====
The Society's NEWS is its newsletter, distributed quarterly to individual and institutional members. The NEWS ranges in length from about 32 to 60 pages each issue. In addition to news items about the VdGSA, its Chapters, members, and other items pertaining to the viol, it features reviews of CDs and new editions of music.

==== Music ====
The Society publishes an extensive series of music for the viol. A reciprocal agreement with the Viola da Gamba Society (VdGS) of Great Britain allows each society to publish the other's music in their respective countries.

A selection of free downloadable music is publicly available. Members have access to PDF copies of music published in the VdGSA News, plus a series of works called "Easy Music to Teach your Neighbor".

=== Traynor competition ===
The Viola da Gamba Society of America sponsors the International Leo M. Traynor Composition Competition for new music for viols every fourth or fifth year. The aim of the competition is to stimulate development of a contemporary literature for this early instrument and thus continue its tradition in modern society. Winners of the 11th Competition were announced at the July 2017 VdGSA Conclave. Winners of the 12th Traynor Competition were announced in July 2022 at the VdGSA's 60th Annual Conclave.

=== Special projects ===
During the 2015 Conclave at Emory University in Atlanta, Georgia, two luthiers, Francis Beaulieu of Montréal and Marc Soubeyran of Ludlow (UK), assisted by luthier Russell Wagner of Chicago, worked nearly around the clock in collaboration to build a copy of an eighteenth-century French treble viol from the Caldwell Collection. The entire process was documented in great detail by multiple cameras. All the work and materials were donated, and the finished instrument was raffled at Conclave to benefit the Society.

== See also ==
- Viol
- Category:Viol players
