= The Last Dog and Pony Show =

Studio album by Bob Mould
- Released: August 25, 1998
- Genre: Alternative rock
- Length: 48:11
- Labels: Rykodisc, Creation
- Producer: Bob Mould

Bob Mould chronology
Bob Mould (1996)	The Last Dog and Pony Show (1998)	Modulate (2002)

Singles from The Last Dog and Pony Show
- 1. "Classifieds"/"Moving Trucks" Released: August 1998 (Double A-Side)

The Last Dog and Pony Show is the fourth solo album by American alternative rock musician Bob Mould.

== Background ==
The title refers to the fact that Mould planned to cease touring with a full electric band after supporting the album (a plan he stuck to until hitting the road to support his 2005 release, Body of Song). "I'm 37 years old now," he said at the time. "I've been doing it for almost 20 years. As I get older, I don't enjoy four months on the road of full-throttle volume all the time. Though I still like that kind of music, I'd rather get away from it while I still enjoy it, as opposed to doing it because it's my calling card and it's worked."

"Every other record I do is a bright or a dark record," he observed. "It's not intentional. Maybe it's just me struggling to find some kind of balance. I think this one's fairly outgoing compared to my last, especially, which was real dark and claustrophobic because that was the way I was feeling at the time. This one is a little more easygoing. The stories are a little simpler and more universal. I tend to go through phases when I'm writing, and this one went through three or four pretty distinct stylistic phases before arriving at the bulk of the record, which is the upbeat electric stuff."

Having used programmed drums on his previous, self-titled album, on which he was the sole performer, Mould this time returned to using a real drummer, Matt Hammon. Cellist Alison Chesley also contributes to two tracks.

While the album is steeped in the driving rock he had become known for, songs like "Reflecting Pool," the mechanical-sounding "First Drag of the Day" and the sample-heavy "Megamanic" demonstrate the growing interest in electronica which he would spend the next few years exploring in more depth.

Mould has stated that "Who Was Around?" "was written from the perspective of a child, who at a certain point in their life realizes that none of their needs are being met at all by their parental units, whether that be parents, grandparents or whomever their keepers are." He has also offered the alternative interpretation that the song is instead "from the perspective of an adult who finally realizes these things way too late and that they were left very ill-equipped to deal [with life]."

== Reception ==
Professional ratings
Review scores
Source	Rating
AllMusic	4/5 stars
Pitchfork	7.5/10
Rolling Stone	3/5 stars

The track "Who Was Around?" was named Best Rock/Alternative Song at the 1998 Gay & Lesbian American Music Awards.

== Track listing ==
All tracks composed by Bob Mould

1. "New #1" — 4:47
2. "Moving Trucks" — 3:30
3. "Taking Everything" — 3:26
4. "First Drag of the Day" — 4:29
5. "Classifieds" — 3:04
6. "Who Was Around?" — 4:08
7. "Skintrade" — 5:43
8. "Vaporub" — 4:05
9. "Sweet Serene" — 3:25
10. "Megamanic" — 3:39
11. "Reflecting Pool" — 3:39
12. "Along the Way" — 4:18
  - Some copies of the album include a bonus disc featuring a lengthy interview with Mould conducted by Jack Rabid.

== Personnel ==
- Bob Mould - vocals, guitar, bass, keyboards, programming, sampling
- Matt Hammon - drums
- Alison Chesley - cello (1 and 12)
- Jim Wilson - engineer, sampling
- Howie Weinberg - mastering

== Charts ==
Chart (1998)	Peak position
UK Albums Chart	58
US Billboard 200	164
US Billboard Heatseekers Albums	11
