= Bob Mould (album) =

Studio album by Bob Mould
- Released: April 30, 1996
- Recorded: September–October 1995
- Genre: Alternative rock
- Length: 39:20
- Label: Rykodisc, Creation
- Producer: Bob Mould

Bob Mould chronology
Poison Years (1994)	Bob Mould (1996)	The Last Dog and Pony Show (1998)

Singles from Bob Mould
- 1. "Egøverride" Released: April 1996; 2. "Fort Knox, King Solomon" Released: June 1996; 3. "Next Time That You Leave + 4 (EP)" Released: 1996

Professional ratings
Review scores
Source	Rating
AllMusic	4.5/5 stars
Christgau's Consumer Guide	(neither)
Entertainment Weekly	A−
Rolling Stone	2/5 stars
Spin	6/10

Bob Mould (sometimes referred to as Hubcap) is the third solo album by former Hüsker Dü and Sugar guitarist and singer Bob Mould. It was recorded and mixed between September & November 1995 and released in April 1996. Mould played all of the instruments on the album himself, and the sleeve notes declare, "This one is for me." In the place of traditional band credits, the sleeve states, "Bob Mould is Bob Mould."

The song "Dog on Fire," which was chosen to be the theme song of The Daily Show, was originally written for this album.

== Track listing ==
All songs written by Bob Mould

1. "Anymore Time Between" – 5:40
2. "I Hate Alternative Rock" – 2:55
3. "Fort Knox, King Solomon" – 3:34
4. "Next Time That You Leave" – 3:57
5. "Egøverride" – 3:54
6. "Thumbtack" – 4:59
7. "Hair Stew" – 4:03
8. "Deep Karma Canyon" – 3:01
9. "Art Crisis" – 3:27
10. "Roll Over and Die" – 5:11

B-Sides (Edsel re-release 2012)

11. "Wanted Was" – 4:01
12. "Eternally Fried" – 3:55
13. "Doubleface" – 5:21
14. "Fort Knox, King Solomon" (live) – 2:55
15. "I Hate Alternative Rock" (live) – 2:21

Track 11-13 are the B-Sides of the "Egøverride" single (Rykodisc RCD5-1050), which was released in October 1995. Track 14 and 15 are the B-Sides of the "Fort Knox, King Solomon" promo single (Rykodisc VRCD 3342), which was released in June 1996. The two live tracks were recorded at First Avenue, Minneapolis, Minnesota on February 25, 1996.

== Personnel ==
- Bob Mould - vocals, guitar, bass, keyboards, loops, producer, artwork

Technical

- Jim Wilson - engineer
- Andy Katz - assistant engineer
- Phil Magnotti - assistant engineer
- Howie Weinberg - mastering
- Barbara Longo - artwork

== Charts ==
Chart (1996)	Peak position
UK Albums Chart	52
US Billboard 200	101
US Billboard Heatseekers Albums	1
