= Workbook (album) =

Studio album by Bob Mould
- Released: May 2, 1989
- Recorded: December 1988 – January 1989
- Studios: Paisley Park, Chanhassen; Grog Kill, Willow
- Genre: Alternative rock
- Length: 52:45
- Label: Virgin/Omnivore
- Producer: Bob Mould

Bob Mould chronology
Workbook (1989)	Black Sheets of Rain (1990)

Singles from Workbook
- 1. "See a Little Light" b/w "All Those People Know" Released: 1989; 2. "Wishing Well EP" Released: 1989

Workbook is the 1989 debut solo album by American guitarist and singer Bob Mould, following the breakup of the influential punk rock band Hüsker Dü. The album has a strong folk influence and lighter overall sound than he had been known for, although heavy guitar features occasionally. Drummer Anton Fier and bassist Tony Maimone, both of Pere Ubu fame, served as Mould's rhythm section on the album and on the subsequent live shows. The single "See a Little Light" was a hit on the US Modern Rock chart.

The album has been influential in the alternative rock community: its acoustic elements would be echoed in R.E.M.'s 1992 album Automatic for the People, while Nirvana's 1993 album In Utero used cellos in a similar way. Mould considered the term "alternative rock" to be meaningless, arguing that Hüsker Dü sounded the same no matter its record label, and that his former bandmates were disinterested in exploring different sounds.

In the liner notes of the Hüsker Dü live album The Living End, writer David Fricke noted that Mould had an embryonic version of the song "Compositions for the Young and Old" in the waning days of that band.

"Poison Years" is directed at Hüsker Dü drummer Grant Hart. "There's people who think I'm still sending missiles to Grant," said Mould at the time of his band Sugar's album File Under Easy Listening in 1994. "Sorry to disappoint you, but I took care of that about five years ago. Check out side one, song five on Workbook." In 1989, however, Mould claimed that the song was about himself and his life after the band.

The album was reissued on CD and double LP for its 25th anniversary in 2014 as Workbook 25, by Omnivore Recordings. This remastered edition includes an extra track, "All Those People Know", and a second CD-only disc containing a 1989 live set by Mould at the Cabaret Metro in Chicago.

== Critical reception ==
Professional ratings
Review scores
Source	Rating
AllMusic	4.5/5 stars
The A.V. Club	A
Chicago Tribune	3.5/4 stars
Mojo	4/5 stars
NME	9/10
Pitchfork	8.0/10
Rolling Stone	4/5 stars
The Rolling Stone Album Guide	4/5 stars
Spin	3.5/5 stars
The Village Voice	C+

The Philadelphia Inquirer opined that "Workbook stands among the most complete artistic statements to emerge this year... It does for introspection what Lou Reed's New York did for social awareness, and shares the feeling of catharsis John Lennon brought to 'How Do You Sleep?' and 'Gimme Some Truth' on Imagine." The Austin American-Statesman noted that "the emotionally draining album is littered with the charred remains of his former band, but the bitterness is framed with a sense of honesty and openness that's effectively reflected by Mould's singing."

== Track listing ==
All tracks are written by Bob Mould, except where noted.

No.	Title	Length
1.	"Sunspots"	2:04
2.	"Wishing Well"	5:13
3.	"Heartbreak a Stranger"	5:52
4.	"See a Little Light"	3:32
5.	"Poison Years"	5:24
6.	"Sinners and Their Repentances"	4:05
7.	"Brasilia Crossed with Trenton"	6:39
8.	"Compositions for the Young and Old"	4:39
9.	"Lonely Afternoon"	4:29
10.	"Dreaming, I Am"	4:16
11.	"Whichever Way the Wind Blows"	6:26
Total length:		52:45

Workbook 25 bonus track
No.	Title	Length
12.	"All Those People Know"	3:41

Workbook 25 bonus disc – Live at the Cabaret Metro, 1989
No.	Title	Length
1.	"Sunspots"	2:14
2.	"Wishing Well"	4:32
3.	"Compositions for the Young and Old"	4:21
4.	"Heartbreak a Stranger"	5:34
5.	"Dreaming, I Am"	3:39
6.	"If You're True"	4:34
7.	"Poison Years"	5:44
8.	"Sinners and Their Repentances"	4:53
9.	"Lonely Afternoon"	3:58
10.	"Brasilia Crossed with Trenton"	7:02
11.	"See a Little Light"	3:31
12.	"Whichever Way the Wind Blows"	7:13
13.	"All Those People Know"	3:03
14.	"Shoot Out the Lights" (Richard Thompson cover)	5:59
15.	"Hardly Getting Over It"	4:49
16.	"Celebrated Summer"	4:20
17.	"Makes No Sense at All"	3:25

== Personnel ==
- Bob Mould – vocals, guitar, mandolin, keyboards, percussion
- Tony Maimone – bass guitar
- Anton Fier – drums
- Jane Scarpantoni – cello
- Steven Haigler – engineer, mixing, percussion
- Chris Stamey – rhythm guitar, backing vocals (live disc only)

== Charts ==
Album

Chart (1989)	Peak position
US Billboard 200	127

Single

Title	Chart (1989)	Peak position
"See a Little Light"	US Billboard Modern Rock Tracks	4
