= List of songs recorded by Tom Petty =

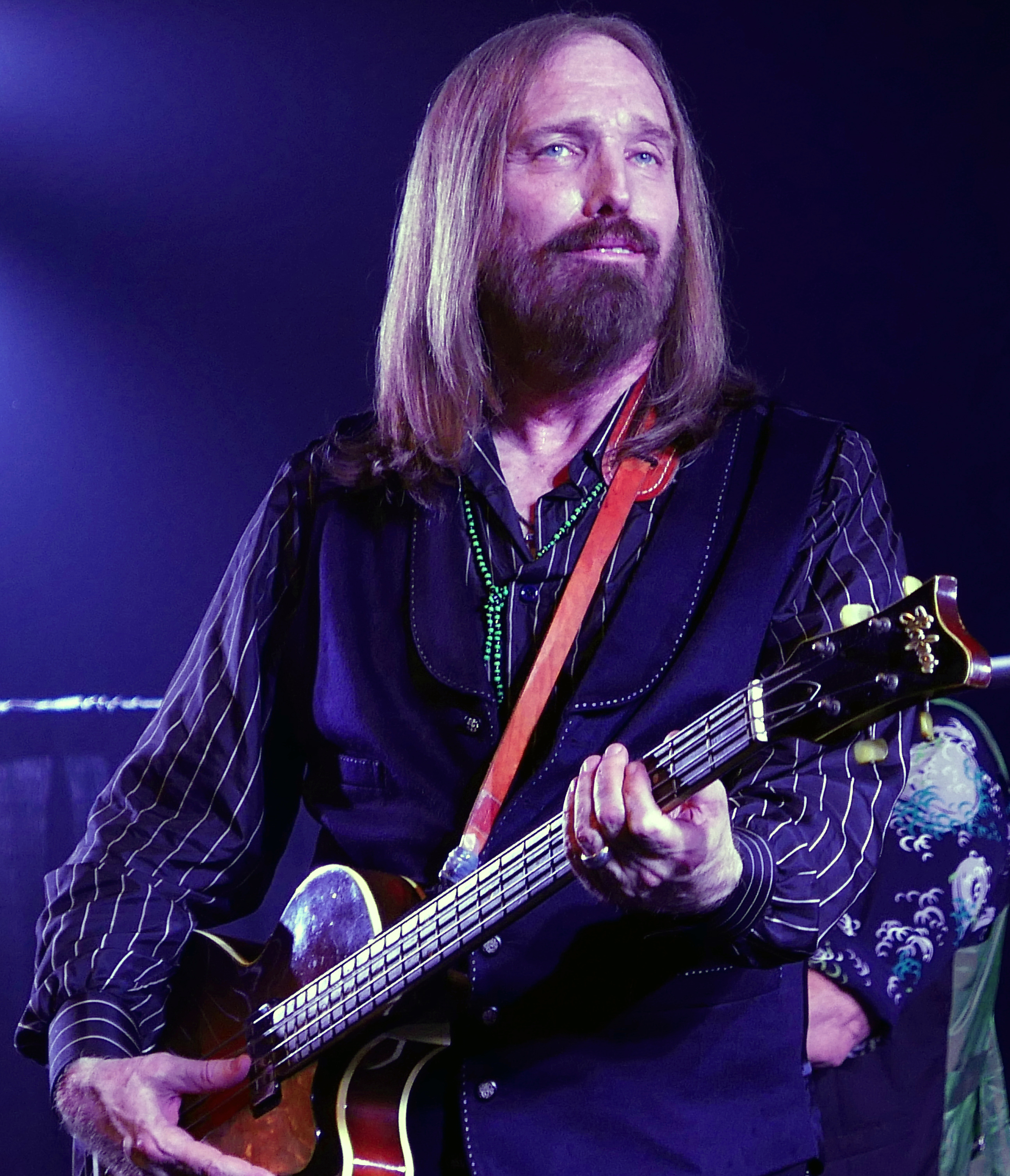
Tom Petty performing in 2016.

The following is a table of all songs recorded by Tom Petty, both as a solo artist and as a member of the Heartbreakers.

== Songs with the Heartbreakers ==
Key
†	Indicates single release
‡	Indicates songs not written or co-written by Tom Petty

Name of song, writer(s), original release, and year of release
Title	Writer(s)	Original release	Year	Ref.
"105 Degrees"	Tom Petty	Angel Dream	2021	
"About to Give Out"	Tom Petty	Echo	1999	
"Accused of Love"	Tom Petty	Echo	1999	
"Ain't Love Strange"	Tom Petty	Let Me Up (I've Had Enough)	1987	
"Airport"	Tom Petty	Songs and Music from "She's the One"	1996	
"All Mixed Up" †	Tom Petty; Mike Campbell	Let Me Up (I've Had Enough)	1987	
"All or Nothin'"	Tom Petty; Mike Campbell; Jeff Lynne	Into the Great Wide Open	1991	
"All the Wrong Reasons"	Tom Petty; Jeff Lynne	Into the Great Wide Open	1991	
"All You Can Carry"	Tom Petty	Hypnotic Eye	2014	
"American Dream Plan B" †	Tom Petty	Hypnotic Eye	2014	
"American Girl" †	Tom Petty	Tom Petty and the Heartbreakers	1976	
"Angel Dream (No. 2)"	Tom Petty	Songs and Music from "She's the One"	1996	
"Angel Dream (No. 4)"	Tom Petty	Songs and Music from "She's the One"	1996	
"Any Way You Want It" (live) (The Dave Clark Five cover)	Dave Clark ‡	The Live Anthology	2009	
"Anything That's Rock 'n' Roll" †	Tom Petty	Tom Petty and the Heartbreakers	1976	
"Asshole" (Beck cover)	Beck Hansen ‡	Songs and Music from "She's the One"	1996	
"Baby's a Rock 'n' Roller"	Tom Petty; Mike Campbell	You're Gonna Get It!	1978	
"The Best of Everything"	Tom Petty	Southern Accents	1985	
"Between Two Worlds"	Tom Petty; Mike Campbell	Long After Dark	1982	
"Billy the Kid"	Tom Petty	Echo	1999	
"Blue Sunday"	Tom Petty; Mike Campbell	The Last DJ	2002	
"Breakdown" †	Tom Petty	Tom Petty and the Heartbreakers	1976	
"Built to Last"	Tom Petty; Jeff Lynne	Into the Great Wide Open	1991	
"Burnt Out Town"	Tom Petty	Hypnotic Eye	2014	
"California"	Tom Petty	Songs and Music from "She's the One"	1996	
"Can't Stop the Sun"	Tom Petty; Mike Campbell	The Last DJ	2002	
"Candy"	Tom Petty	Mojo	2010	
"Casa Dega" †	Tom Petty; Mike Campbell	Non-album single B-side to "Don't Do Me Like That"	1979	
"Century City"	Tom Petty	Damn the Torpedoes	1979	
"Change of Heart" †	Tom Petty	Long After Dark	1982	
"Change the Locks" (Lucinda Williams cover)	Lucinda Williams ‡	Songs and Music from "She's the One"	1996	
"Climb That Hill"	Tom Petty; Mike Campbell	Songs and Music from "She's the One"	1996	
"Counting on You"	Tom Petty	Echo	1999	
"The Criminal Kind"	Tom Petty	Hard Promises	1981	
"The Damage You've Done"	Tom Petty	Let Me Up (I've Had Enough)	1987	
"The Dark of the Sun"	Tom Petty; Jeff Lynne	Into the Great Wide Open	1991	
"Deliver Me"	Tom Petty	Long After Dark	1982	
"Diddy Wah Diddy" (live) (Bo Diddley cover)	Bo Diddley; Willie Dixon ‡	The Live Anthology	2009	
"Dogs on the Run"	Tom Petty; Mike Campbell	Southern Accents	1985	
"Don't Bring Me Down" (live) (The Animals cover)	Gerry Goffin; Carole King ‡	Pack Up the Plantation: Live!	1985	
"Don't Come Around Here No More" †	Tom Petty; Dave Stewart	Southern Accents	1985	
"Don't Do Me Like That" †	Tom Petty	Damn the Torpedoes	1979	
"Don't Make Me Walk the Line"	Tom Petty	Long After Dark (Deluxe Edition)	2024	
"Don't Pull Me Over"	Tom Petty	Mojo	2010	
"Dreamville"	Tom Petty	The Last DJ	2002	
"Echo"	Tom Petty	Echo	1999	
"Even the Losers"	Tom Petty	Damn the Torpedoes	1979	
"Fault Lines"	Tom Petty; Mike Campbell	Hypnotic Eye	2014	
"Finding Out"	Tom Petty	Long After Dark	1982	
"First Flash of Freedom"	Tom Petty; Mike Campbell	Mojo	2010	
"Fooled Again (I Don't Like It)"	Tom Petty	Tom Petty and the Heartbreakers	1976	
"Forgotten Man"	Tom Petty	Hypnotic Eye	2014	
"Free Girl Now" †	Tom Petty	Echo	1999	
"French Disconnection"	Tom Petty	Angel Dream	2021	
"Friend of the Devil" (live) (Grateful Dead cover)	John Dawson; Jerry Garcia; Robert Hunter ‡	The Live Anthology	2009	
"Full Grown Boy"	Tom Petty	Hypnotic Eye	2014	
"Gator On The Lawn" †	Tom Petty	Non-album single B-side to "A Woman in Love (It's Not Me)"	1981	
"Goldfinger" (live) (Shirley Bassey cover)	John Barry; Leslie Bricusse; Anthony Newley ‡	The Live Anthology	2009	
"Good, Good Lovin'" (live) (James Brown cover)	James Brown; Albert Shubert ‡	The Live Anthology	2009	
"Good Enough" †	Tom Petty; Mike Campbell	Mojo	2010	
"Green Onions" (live) (Booker T. & the M.G.'s cover)	Steve Cropper; Al Jackson Jr. Booker T. Jones; Lewie Steinberg ‡	The Live Anthology	2009	
"Grew Up Fast"	Tom Petty	Songs and Music from "She's the One"	1996	
"Have Love Will Travel"	Tom Petty	The Last DJ	2002	
"Help Me"	Sonny Boy Williamson II; Willie Dixon; Ralph Bass ‡	Extra Mojo	2023	
"Here Comes My Girl" †	Tom Petty	Damn the Torpedoes	1979	
"Heartbreakers Beach Party" †	Tom Petty	Non-album single B-side to "Change Of Heart"	1983	
"High In the Morning"	Tom Petty	Mojo	2010	
"Hometown Blues"	Tom Petty	Tom Petty and the Heartbreakers	1976	
"Hope on Board"	Tom Petty	Songs and Music from "She's the One"	1996	
"Hope You Never"	Tom Petty	Songs and Music from "She's the One"	1996	
"How Many More Days"	Tom Petty	Let Me Up (I've Had Enough)	1987	
"Hung Up and Overdue"	Tom Petty	Songs and Music from "She's the One"	1996	
"Hurt"	Tom Petty; Mike Campbell	You're Gonna Get It!	1978	
"I Don't Know What to Say to You" †	Tom Petty	Non-album single B-side to "Listen to Her Heart"	1978	
"I Don't Wanna Fight"	Mike Campbell	Echo	1999	
"I Just Want to Make Love to You" (live) (Muddy Waters cover)	Willie Dixon ‡	The Live Anthology	2009	
"I Need to Know" †	Tom Petty	You're Gonna Get It!	1978	
"I Should Have Known It"	Tom Petty; Mike Campbell	Mojo	2010	
"I Want You Back Again" (live) (The Zombies cover)	Rod Argent ‡	The Live Anthology	2009	
"I'm a Man" (live) (Bo Diddley cover)	Bo Diddley; Koko Taylor ‡	The Live Anthology	2009	
"I'm in Love" (live) (Aretha Franklin cover)	Bobby Womack ‡	The Live Anthology	2009	
"Insider"	Tom Petty	Hard Promises	1981	
"Into the Great Wide Open" †	Tom Petty; Jeff Lynne	Into the Great Wide Open	1991	
"It Ain't Nothin' to Me"	Tom Petty; Dave Stewart	Southern Accents	1985	
"It'll All Work Out"	Tom Petty	Let Me Up (I've Had Enough)	1987	
"It's Rainin' Again" †	Tom Petty	Non-album single B-side to "Refugee"	1980	
"Jammin' Me"	Tom Petty; Bob Dylan; Mike Campbell	Let Me Up (I've Had Enough)	1987	
"Jefferson Jericho Blues"	Tom Petty	Mojo	2010	
"Joe"	Tom Petty	The Last DJ	2002	
"Keeping Me Alive"	Tom Petty	Long After Dark (Deluxe Edition)	2024	
"Kings Highway"	Tom Petty	Into the Great Wide Open	1991	
"Kings Road"	Tom Petty	Hard Promises	1981	
"The Last DJ" †	Tom Petty	The Last DJ	2002	
"Learning to Fly" †	Tom Petty; Jeff Lynne	Into the Great Wide Open	1991	
"Let Me Up (I've Had Enough)"	Tom Petty; Mike Campbell	Let Me Up (I've Had Enough)	1987	
"Let Yourself Go"	Tom Petty	Mojo	2010	
"Letting You Go"	Tom Petty	Hard Promises	1981	
"Like a Diamond"	Tom Petty	The Last DJ	2002	
"Listen to Her Heart" †	Tom Petty	You're Gonna Get It!	1978	
"Little Girl Blues" (Aretha Franklin cover)	Tom Petty	Mojo (iTunes bonus track)	2010	
"Lonesome Sundown"	Tom Petty	Echo	1999	
"Lost Children"	Tom Petty	The Last DJ	2002	
"Louisiana Rain"	Tom Petty	Damn the Torpedoes	1979	
"Lover's Touch"	Tom Petty	Mojo	2010	
"Luna"	Tom Petty	Tom Petty and the Heartbreakers	1976	
"Magnolia"	Tom Petty	You're Gonna Get It!	1978	
"Make It Better (Forget About Me)" †	Tom Petty; Dave Stewart	Southern Accents	1985	
"Make That Connection" †	Tom Petty	Non-album single B-side to "Jammin' Me"	1987	
"Makin' Some Noise"	Tom Petty; Mike Campbell; Jeff Lynne	Into the Great Wide Open	1991	
"The Man Who Loves Women"	Tom Petty	The Last DJ	2002	
"Mary Jane's Last Dance" †	Tom Petty	Greatest Hits	1993	
"Mary's New Car"	Tom Petty	Southern Accents	1985	
"Money Becomes King"	Tom Petty	The Last DJ	2002	
"My Life/Your World"	Tom Petty; Mike Campbell	Let Me Up (I've Had Enough)	1987	
"Mystery Man"	Tom Petty	Tom Petty and the Heartbreakers	1976	
"Mystery of Love"	Tom Petty	Extra Mojo	2023	
"Mystic Eyes" (live) (Them cover)	Van Morrison ‡	The Live Anthology	2009	
"Needles and Pins" † (live) (Jackie DeShannon cover)	Sonny Bono; Jack Nitzsche ‡	Pack Up the Plantation: Live!	1985	
"Never Be You"	Tom Petty; Benmont Tench	Long After Dark (Deluxe Edition)	2024	
"Nightwatchman"	Tom Petty; Mike Campbell	Hard Promises	1981	
"No More"	Tom Petty	Echo	1999	
"No Reason to Cry"	Tom Petty	Mojo	2010	
"No Second Thoughts"	Tom Petty	You're Gonna Get It!	1978	
"Nowhere"	Tom Petty	Damn the Torpedoes (Deluxe Edition)	1979	
"Oh Well" (live) (Fleetwood Mac cover)	Peter Green ‡	The Live Anthology	2009	
"One More Day, One More Night"	Tom Petty	Echo	1999	
"One of Life's Little Mysteries"	Tom Petty	Angel Dream	2021	
"One on One"	Tom Petty	Long After Dark (Deluxe Edition)	2024	
"A One Story Town"	Tom Petty	Long After Dark	1982	
"Out in the Cold"	Tom Petty; Jeff Lynne	Into the Great Wide Open	1991	
"Peace in L.A." †	Tom Petty	Non-album single	1992	
"Playing Dumb"	Tom Petty	Hypnotic Eye (Vinyl and Blu-ray bonus track cover)	2014	
"Power Drunk"	Tom Petty	Hypnotic Eye	2014	
"Rebels" †	Tom Petty	Southern Accents	1985	
"Red River"	Tom Petty	Hypnotic Eye	2014	
"Refugee" †	Tom Petty	Damn the Torpedoes	1979	
"Restless"	Tom Petty	You're Gonna Get It!	1978	
"Rhino Skin"	Tom Petty	Echo	1999	
"Rockin' Around (With You)"	Tom Petty; Mike Campbell	Tom Petty and the Heartbreakers	1976	
"Room at the Top"	Tom Petty	Echo	1999	
"Runaway Trains"	Tom Petty; Mike Campbell	Let Me Up (I've Had Enough)	1987	
"Running Man's Bible"	Tom Petty	Mojo	2010	
"The Same Old You"	Tom Petty; Mike Campbell	Long After Dark	1982	
"A Self-Made Man"	Tom Petty	Let Me Up (I've Had Enough)	1987	
"Shadow of a Doubt (A Complex Kid)"	Tom Petty	Damn the Torpedoes	1979	
"Shadow People"	Tom Petty	Hypnotic Eye	2014	
"Shout" (live) (The Isley Brothers cover)	O'Kelly Isley Jr. Ronald Isley; Rudolph Isley ‡	Pack Up the Plantation: Live!	1985	
"Sins of My Youth"	Tom Petty	Hypnotic Eye	2014	
"So You Want to Be a Rock 'n' Roll Star" † (live) (The Byrds cover)	Chris Hillman; Roger McGuinn ‡	Pack Up the Plantation: Live!	1985	
"Somethin' Else"	Bob Cochran; Sharon Sheeley ‡	Damn the Torpedoes (Deluxe Edition)	1979	
"Something Big"	Tom Petty	Hard Promises	1981	
"Something Good Coming"	Tom Petty	Mojo	2010	
"Something in the Air" (Thunderclap Newman cover)	Speedy Keen; Andy Newman ‡	Greatest Hits	1993	
"Somewhere Under Heaven" †	Tom Petty; Mike Campbell	Non-album single	2015	
"Southern Accents"	Tom Petty	Southern Accents	1985	
"Spike"	Tom Petty	Southern Accents	1985	
"Stories We Could Tell" (live) (John Sebastian cover)	John Sebastian ‡	Pack Up the Plantation: Live!	1985	
"Straight into Darkness" †	Tom Petty	Long After Dark	1982	
"Strangered in the Night"	Tom Petty	Tom Petty and the Heartbreakers	1976	
"Supernatural Radio"	Tom Petty	Songs and Music from "She's the One"	1996	
"Surrender"	Tom Petty	Anthology: Through the Years	2000	
"Sweet William" †	Tom Petty	Non-album single B-side to "Room At The Top"	1999	
"Swingin'"	Tom Petty	Echo	1999	
"Takin' My Time"	Tom Petty	Mojo	2010	
"A Thing About You"	Tom Petty	Hard Promises	1981	
"Think About Me"	Tom Petty	Let Me Up (I've Had Enough)	1987	
"Thirteen Days"	JJ Cale ‡	Angel Dream	2021	
"This One's for Me"	Tom Petty	Echo	1999	
"Too Good to Be True"	Tom Petty	Into the Great Wide Open	1991	
"Too Much Ain't Enough"	Tom Petty	You're Gonna Get It!	1978	
"Trailer" †	Tom Petty	Non-album single B-side to "Don't Come Around Here No More"	1985	
"The Trip to Pirate's Cove"	Tom Petty	Mojo	2010	
"Turning Point"	Tom Petty	Long After Dark (Deluxe Edition)	2024	
"Two Gunslingers"	Tom Petty	Into the Great Wide Open	1991	
"U.S. 41"	Tom Petty	Mojo	2010	
"U Get Me High" †	Tom Petty	Hypnotic Eye	2014	
"The Waiting" †	Tom Petty	Hard Promises	1981	
"Walls (Circus)" †	Tom Petty	Songs and Music from "She's the One"	1996	
"Walls (No. 3)"	Tom Petty	Songs and Music from "She's the One"	1996	
"A Wasted Life"	Tom Petty; Mike Campbell	Long After Dark	1982	
"Ways to Be Wicked"	Tom Petty; Mike Campbell	Long After Dark (Deluxe Edition)	2024	
"We Stand a Chance"	Tom Petty	Long After Dark	1982	
"What Are Doin' in My Life"	Tom Petty	Damn the Torpedoes	1979	
"When a Kid Goes Bad"	Tom Petty	The Last DJ	2002	
"When the Time Comes"	Tom Petty	You're Gonna Get It!	1978	
"The Wild One, Forever"	Tom Petty	Tom Petty and the Heartbreakers	1976	
"Wild Thing"	Chip Taylor ‡	Long After Dark (Deluxe Edition)	2024	
"A Woman in Love (It's Not Me)" †	Tom Petty; Mike Campbell	Hard Promises	1981	
"Won't Last Long"	Tom Petty	Echo	1999	
"You and I Will Meet Again"	Tom Petty	Into the Great Wide Open	1991	
"You and Me"	Tom Petty	The Last DJ	2002	
"You Can Still Change Your Mind"	Tom Petty; Mike Campbell	Hard Promises	1981	
"You Got Lucky" †	Tom Petty; Mike Campbell	Long After Dark	1982	
"You Tell Me"	Tom Petty	Damn the Torpedoes	1979	
"You're Gonna Get It"	Tom Petty	You're Gonna Get It!	1978	
"Zero from Outer Space"	Tom Petty	Songs and Music from "She's the One"	1996	

== Songs as a solo artist ==
Key
†	Indicates single release
‡	Indicates songs not solely written by Tom Petty

Name of song, writer(s), original release, and year of release.
Title	Writer(s)	Original release	Year	Ref.
"Alright for Now"	Tom Petty	Full Moon Fever	1989	
"Ankle Deep"	Tom Petty	Highway Companion	2006	
"The Apartment Song"	Tom Petty	Full Moon Fever	1989	
"Around the Roses" (Note: Special edition bonus track)	Tom Petty	Highway Companion	2006	
"Big Weekend"	Tom Petty	Highway Companion	2006	
"Cabin Down Below"	Tom Petty	Wildflowers	1994	
"Crawling Back to You"	Tom Petty	Wildflowers	1994	
"Damaged by Love"	Tom Petty	Highway Companion	2006	
"Depending on You"	Tom Petty	Full Moon Fever	1989	
"Don't Fade on Me"	Tom Petty; Mike Campbell ‡	Wildflowers	1994	
"Don't Treat Me Like a Stranger" †	Tom Petty	Non-album single B-side to "I Won't Back Down"	1989	
"Down South"	Tom Petty	Highway Companion	2006	
"Down the Line" †	Tom Petty; Mike Campbell	Non-album single B-side to "Free Fallin'" (US)	1989	
"A Face in the Crowd" †	Tom Petty; Jeff Lynne ‡	Full Moon Fever	1989	
"Flirting with Time"	Tom Petty	Highway Companion	2006	
"Free Fallin'" †	Tom Petty; Jeff Lynne ‡	Full Moon Fever	1989	
"Girl on LSD" †	Tom Petty	Non-album single B-side of "You Don't Know How It Feels"	1994	
"The Golden Rose"	Tom Petty	Highway Companion	2006	
"Hard on Me"	Tom Petty	Wildflowers	1994	
"A Higher Place"	Tom Petty	Wildflowers	1994	
"Home"	Tom Petty	Highway Companion	2006	
"Honey Bee"	Tom Petty	Wildflowers	1994	
"House in the Woods"	Tom Petty	Wildflowers	1994	
"I Won't Back Down" †	Tom Petty; Jeff Lynne ‡	Full Moon Fever	1989	
"I'll Feel a Whole Lot Better" † (The Byrds cover)	Gene Clark ‡	Full Moon Fever	1989	
"It's Good to Be King"	Tom Petty	Wildflowers	1994	
"Jack"	Tom Petty	Highway Companion	2006	
"Love Is a Long Road"	Tom Petty; Mike Campbell ‡	Full Moon Fever	1989	
"A Mind with a Heart of Its Own"	Tom Petty; Jeff Lynne ‡	Full Moon Fever	1989	
"Night Driver"	Tom Petty	Highway Companion	2006	
"Only a Broken Heart"	Tom Petty	Wildflowers	1994	
"Runnin' Down a Dream" †	Tom Petty; Jeff Lynne; Mike Campbell ‡	Full Moon Fever	1989	
"Saving Grace" †	Tom Petty	Highway Companion	2006	
"Square One"	Tom Petty	Highway Companion	2006	
"This Old Town"	Tom Petty	Highway Companion	2006	
"Time to Move On"	Tom Petty	Wildflowers	1994	
"To Find a Friend"	Tom Petty	Wildflowers	1994	
"Turn This Car Around"	Tom Petty	Highway Companion	2006	
"Wake Up Time"	Tom Petty	Wildflowers	1994	
"Wildflowers"	Tom Petty	Wildflowers	1994	
"Yer So Bad" †	Tom Petty; Jeff Lynne ‡	Full Moon Fever	1989	
"You Don't Know How It Feels" †	Tom Petty	Wildflowers	1994	
"You Wreck Me"	Tom Petty; Mike Campbell ‡	Wildflowers	1994	
"Zombie Zoo"	Tom Petty; Jeff Lynne ‡	Full Moon Fever	1989	
