= Anthology: Through the Years =

Compilation album by Tom Petty and the Heartbreakers
- Released: October 31, 2000
- Recorded: 1976–2000
- Genre: Heartland rock; rock and roll
- Length: 124:07
- Label: MCA
- Producer: Denny Cordell; Noah Shark; Tom Petty; Jimmy Iovine; Mike Campbell; David A. Stewart; Robbie Robertson; Jeff Lynne; Rick Rubin; Bill Bottrell

Tom Petty and the Heartbreakers chronology
Echo (1999)	Anthology: Through the Years (2000)	The Last DJ (2002)

Professional ratings
Review scores
Source	Rating
AllMusic	4.5/5 stars
Blender	4/5 stars
Encyclopedia of Popular Music	5/5 stars
Entertainment Weekly	A
The Essential Rock Discography	8/10
Q	4/5 stars
The Rolling Stone Album Guide	3.5/5 stars
Uncut	4/5 stars

Anthology: Through the Years is a double compilation album featuring the best of Tom Petty and the Heartbreakers. It contains a new song, "Surrender," written by Petty in 1976 and recorded during sessions for the band's first album but left off the record, recorded again in 1979 but left off "Damn The Torpedoes," and finally recorded again in 2000 for this release. "Surrender" is also the last studio recording of Howie Epstein before his death in 2003. The 1976 version of the song was included on the 2018 box set An American Treasure.

Anthology: Through the Years was released on October 31, 2000, debuted at No. 132, which would mark the lowest chart-positioning on the Billboard 200 for the band. However, in November 2006, the album was certified Gold (equivalent to 500,000 copies sold) by the RIAA. It reached a new peak of No. 32 on Billboard 200 after Petty's death in 2017.

== Track listing ==
All tracks are written by Tom Petty, except where noted.

Disc one
No.	Title	Writer(s)	Original album/notes	Length
1.	"Breakdown"		From Tom Petty and the Heartbreakers, 1976	2:42
2.	"American Girl"		From Tom Petty and the Heartbreakers	3:30
3.	"Hometown Blues"		From Tom Petty and the Heartbreakers	2:11
4.	"The Wild One, Forever"		From Tom Petty and the Heartbreakers	3:03
5.	"I Need to Know"		From You're Gonna Get It!, 1978	2:24
6.	"Listen to Her Heart"		From You're Gonna Get It!	3:01
7.	"Too Much Ain't Enough"		From You're Gonna Get It!	2:56
8.	"Refugee"	Petty, Mike Campbell	From Damn the Torpedoes, 1979	3:21
9.	"Here Comes My Girl"	Petty, Campbell	From Damn the Torpedoes	4:33
10.	"Don't Do Me Like That"		From Damn the Torpedoes	2:44
11.	"Even the Losers"		From Damn the Torpedoes	4:00
12.	"The Waiting"		From Hard Promises, 1981	4:00
13.	"A Woman in Love (It's Not Me)"	Petty, Campbell	From Hard Promises	4:22
14.	"Stop Draggin' My Heart Around" (with Stevie Nicks)	Petty, Campbell	From Nicks' album Bella Donna, 1981	4:04
15.	"You Got Lucky"	Petty, Campbell	From Long After Dark, 1982	3:37
16.	"Straight into Darkness"		From Long After Dark	3:49
17.	"Change of Heart"		From Long After Dark	3:18

Disc two
No.	Title	Writer(s)	Original album/notes	Length
1.	"Rebels"		From Southern Accents, 1985	5:20
2.	"Don't Come Around Here No More"	Petty, David A. Stewart	from Southern Accents	5:06
3.	"The Best of Everything"		From Southern Accents	4:03
4.	"So You Want to Be a Rock 'n' Roll Star"	Roger McGuinn, Chris Hillman	From Pack Up the Plantation: Live!, 1985	3:38
5.	"Jammin' Me"	Petty, Campbell, Bob Dylan	From Let Me Up (I've Had Enough), 1987	4:08
6.	"It'll All Work Out"		From Let Me Up (I've Had Enough)	3:12
7.	"Love Is a Long Road"	Petty, Campbell	From Full Moon Fever, 1989	4:06
8.	"Free Fallin'"	Petty, Jeff Lynne	From Full Moon Fever	4:14
9.	"Yer So Bad"	Petty, Lynne	From Full Moon Fever	3:05
10.	"I Won't Back Down"	Petty, Lynne	From Full Moon Fever	2:56
11.	"Runnin' Down a Dream"	Petty, Campbell, Lynne	From Full Moon Fever	4:23
12.	"Learning to Fly"	Petty, Lynne	From Into the Great Wide Open, 1991	4:03
13.	"Into the Great Wide Open"	Petty, Lynne	From Into the Great Wide Open	3:44
14.	"Two Gunslingers"		From Into the Great Wide Open	3:10
15.	"Mary Jane's Last Dance"		From Greatest Hits, 1993	4:32
16.	"Waiting for Tonight"		From Playback, 1995	3:31
17.	"Surrender"		Re-recorded outtake, 2000	2:54

== Personnel ==
Tom Petty and the Heartbreakers

- Tom Petty – vocals, rhythm guitar, harmonica, percussion (all tracks on discs 1 & 2)
- Mike Campbell – lead guitar, bass guitar, mandolin, koto (all tracks on discs 1 & 2)
- Benmont Tench – piano, keyboards, backing vocals (all tracks on discs 1; tracks 1–6, 12–17 on disc 2)
- Scott Thurston – guitar, backing vocals (track 17 on disc 2)
- Ron Blair – bass guitar, cello (tracks 1–11 on Disc 1)
- Howie Epstein – bass guitar, backing vocals (tracks 15–17 on disc 1; tracks 1–7, 10, 12–17 on disc 2)
- Stan Lynch – drums, percussion, backing vocals (all tracks on disc 1; tracks 1–6, 12–16 on disc 2)
- Steve Ferrone – drums (track 17 on disc 2)

Additional personnel

- Jeff Jourard - electric guitar (track 1 on disc 1)
- Phil Seymour – backing vocals (tracks 1–2 on disc 1)
- Randall Marsh – drums (track 3 on disc 1)
- Duck Dunn – bass guitar (tracks 3, 13–14 on disc 1)
- Stevie Nicks – lead and backing vocals (track 14 on disc 1)
- Jim Keltner – shaker, tambourine (track 8 on disc 1) percussion (track 3 on disc 2), drums, percussion (track 7 on disc 2)
- Phil Jones – percussion (tracks 9–17 on disc 1), drums, percussion (tracks 7–11 on disc 2)
- John Berry Jr., Dick Braun, Jim Colie, William Bergman, Kurt McGettrick, Molly Duncan, Dave Plews – horns (track 1 on disc 2)
- Bobbye Hall - tambourine (track 1 on disc 2)
- Dean Garcia – intro bass guitar (track 2 on disc 2)
- Daniel Rothmuller – cello (track 2 on disc 2)
- Alan Weidel – wild dog piano (track 2 on disc 2)
- Stephanie Spruill, Sharon Celani, and Marilyn Martin – backing vocals (track 2 on disc 2)
- Dave Stewart – electric sitar, synthesizer, backing vocals (track 2 on disc 2)
- Garth Hudson – organ (track 3 on disc 2)
- Richard Manuel – backing vocal (track 3 on disc 2)
- Gary Chang – synthesizer (track 3 on disc 2)
- Jerry Hey – horn conductor, arranger (track 3 on disc 2)
- Lee Thornburg – trumpet (track 4 on disc 2)
- Carroll Sue Hill, Pat Peterson – backing vocals, percussion (track 4 on disc 2)
- Jeff Lynne – bass guitar, guitar, guitar synthesizer, piano, keyboards, backing vocals (tracks 7–14 on disc 2)
- George Harrison – acoustic guitar, backing vocals (track 10 on disc 2)
- Richard Tandy – synthesizer (track 14 on disc 2)
- Chris Trujillo – percussion (track 15 on disc 2)
- The Bangles (Susanna Hoffs, Debbi Peterson, Vicki Peterson, Michael Steele) - backing vocals (track 16 on disc 2)
- George Drakoulias – percussion (track 17 on disc 2)
- Lenny Castro – percussion (track 17 on disc 2)

== Charts ==
2000 weekly chart performance for Anthology: Through the Years
Chart (2000)	Peak position
US Billboard 200	132

2001 weekly chart performance for Anthology: Through the Years
Chart (2001)	Peak position
UK Albums Chart	14

2002 weekly chart performance for Anthology: Through the Years
Chart (2002)	Peak position
Danish Top 40 Albums	22
New Zealand Top 40 Albums	19

2008 weekly chart performance for Anthology: Through the Years
Chart (2008)	Peak position
US Catalog Albums	6

2017 weekly chart performance for Anthology: Through the Years
Chart (2017)	Peak position
Australian Albums (ARIA)	51
Canadian Albums (Billboard)	60
US Billboard 200	32

== Certifications ==
Certifications for Anthology: Through the Years
Region	Certification	Certified units/sales
United Kingdom (BPI)	Gold	100,000^{^}
United States (RIAA)	Gold	500,000^{^}
^{^} Shipments figures based on certification alone.
