= Playback (Tom Petty and the Heartbreakers album) =

Box set by Tom Petty and the Heartbreakers
- Released: November 20, 1995
- Recorded: 1973–93 (plus 1995 overdubs)
- Genre: Rock
- Length: 5:14:39
- Label: MCA
- Producers: Mike Campbell; Denny Cordell; George Drakoulias; Jimmy Iovine; Jeff Lynne; Tom Petty; Robbie Robertson; Rick Rubin; Noah Shark; David A. Stewart

Tom Petty and the Heartbreakers chronology
Wildflowers (1994)	Playback (1995)	Songs and Music from "She's the One" (1996)

Professional ratings
Review scores
Source	Rating
AllMusic	4.5/5 stars
Entertainment Weekly	A−
MusicHound	4.5/5 stars
Q	4/5 stars
The Rolling Stone Album Guide	3.5/5 stars
Spin	8/10

Playback is a box set compilation by Tom Petty and the Heartbreakers, released in 1995. It contains popular album tracks, B-sides, previously unreleased outtakes, and early songs by Petty's previous band Mudcrutch.

The first three discs of this collection are arranged in rough chronological order. Disc One covers the years 1976–81, Disc Two covers 1982–87 and Disc Three covers 1989–93.

Disc four brings together 15 B-sides that were never officially released on Tom Petty or Heartbreakers albums. Some of these seem like throwaways, while others are miscellaneous live tracks usually found on singles' flipsides.

Discs five and six offer 27 recordings that include tracks previously unreleased or unavailable on CD, dating back to Petty's early days with his pre-Heartbreakers band Mudcrutch.

A companion VHS home video, later released on DVD, featured the band's most popular music videos.

== Track listing ==
All tracks written by Tom Petty except where noted.

Disc one: The Big Jangle
No.	Title	Track source	Length
1.	"Breakdown"	Tom Petty and the Heartbreakers	2:42
2.	"American Girl"	Tom Petty and the Heartbreakers	3:33
3.	"Hometown Blues"	Tom Petty and the Heartbreakers	2:12
4.	"Anything That's Rock 'n' Roll"	Tom Petty and the Heartbreakers	2:24
5.	"I Need to Know"	You're Gonna Get It!	2:24
6.	"Listen to Her Heart"	You're Gonna Get It!	3:03
7.	"When the Time Comes"	You're Gonna Get It!	2:45
8.	"Too Much Ain't Enough"	You're Gonna Get It!	2:57
9.	"No Second Thoughts"	You're Gonna Get It!	2:39
10.	"Baby's a Rock 'n' Roller" (Petty, Mike Campbell)	You're Gonna Get It!	2:52
11.	"Refugee" (Petty, Campbell)	Damn the Torpedoes	3:22
12.	"Here Comes My Girl" (Petty, Campbell)	Damn the Torpedoes	4:25
13.	"Even the Losers"	Damn the Torpedoes	3:59
14.	"Shadow of a Doubt (A Complex Kid)"	Damn the Torpedoes	4:25
15.	"Don't Do Me Like That"	Damn the Torpedoes	2:42
16.	"The Waiting"	Hard Promises	3:59
17.	"A Woman in Love (It's Not Me)" (Petty, Campbell)	Hard Promises	4:23
18.	"Something Big"	Hard Promises	4:44
19.	"A Thing About You"	Hard Promises	3:32
20.	"Insider"	Hard Promises	4:23
21.	"You Can Still Change Your Mind" (Petty, Campbell)	Hard Promises	4:16

Disc two: Spoiled & Mistreated
No.	Title	Track source	Length
1.	"You Got Lucky" (Petty, Campbell)	Long After Dark	3:36
2.	"Change of Heart"	Long After Dark	3:19
3.	"Straight into Darkness"	Long After Dark	3:47
4.	"The Same Old You" (Petty, Campbell)	Long After Dark	3:30
5.	"Rebels"	Southern Accents	5:19
6.	"Don't Come Around Here No More" (Petty, Dave Stewart)	Southern Accents	5:05
7.	"Southern Accents"	Southern Accents	4:44
8.	"Make It Better (Forget About Me)" (Petty, Stewart)	Southern Accents	4:23
9.	"The Best of Everything"	Southern Accents	4:03
10.	"So You Want to Be a Rock 'n' Roll Star (Live)" (Roger McGuinn, Chris Hillman)	Pack Up the Plantation: Live!	3:30
11.	"Don't Bring Me Down (Live)" (Gerry Goffin, Carole King)	Pack Up the Plantation: Live!	3:52
12.	"Jammin' Me" (Petty, Campbell, Bob Dylan)	Let Me Up (I've Had Enough)	4:08
13.	"It'll All Work Out"	Let Me Up (I've Had Enough)	3:11
14.	"Mike's Life/Mike's World" (Campbell)	Let Me Up (I've Had Enough)	0:40
15.	"Think About Me"	Let Me Up (I've Had Enough)	3:45
16.	"A Self-Made Man"	Let Me Up (I've Had Enough)	3:00

Disc three: Good Booty
No.	Title	Track source	Length
1.	"Free Fallin'" (Petty, Jeff Lynne)	Full Moon Fever	4:16
2.	"I Won't Back Down" (Petty, Lynne)	Full Moon Fever	2:57
3.	"Love is a Long Road" (Petty, Campbell)	Full Moon Fever	4:08
4.	"Runnin' Down a Dream" (Petty, Lynne, Campbell)	Full Moon Fever	4:23
5.	"Yer So Bad" (Petty, Lynne)	Full Moon Fever	3:06
6.	"Alright for Now"	Full Moon Fever	2:02
7.	"Learning to Fly" (Petty, Lynne)	Into the Great Wide Open	4:03
8.	"Into the Great Wide Open" (Petty, Lynne)	Into the Great Wide Open	3:43
9.	"All or Nothin'" (Petty, Lynne, Campbell)	Into the Great Wide Open	4:07
10.	"Out in the Cold" (Petty, Lynne)	Into the Great Wide Open	3:40
11.	"Built to Last" (Petty, Lynne)	Into the Great Wide Open	3:58
12.	"Mary Jane's Last Dance"	Greatest Hits	4:33
13.	"Christmas All Over Again"	A Very Special Christmas 2	4:15

Disc four: The Other Sides
No.	Title	Track source	Length
1.	"Casa Dega" (Petty, Campbell)	B-side of "Don't Do Me Like That"	3:37
2.	"Heartbreakers Beach Party"	B-side of "Change of Heart"	1:57
3.	"Trailer"	B-side of "Don't Come Around Here No More"	3:15
4.	"Cracking Up" (Nick Lowe)	B-side of "Make It Better (Forget About Me)"	3:34
5.	"Psychotic Reaction (Live at Lawlor Events Center November 23, 1991)" (Kenn Ellner / Roy Chaney / Craig Atkinson / John Byrne / John Michalski)	Take the Highway	4:49
6.	"I'm Tired Joey Boy (Live at Lawlor Events Center November 23, 1991)" (Van Morrison)	Take the Highway	3:42
7.	"Lonely Weekends (Live at Oakland Coliseum, November 24, 1991)" (Charlie Rich)	"Too Good to Be True" maxi CD single	2:47
8.	"Gator on the Lawn"	B-side of "A Woman in Love (It's Not Me)"	1:35
9.	"Make That Connection" (Petty, Campbell)	B-side of "Jammin' Me"	5:04
10.	"Down the Line" (Petty, Lynne, Campbell)	B-side of "Free Fallin'"	2:53
11.	"Peace in L.A. (Peace Mix)"	B-side of "Peace in L.A."	4:43
12.	"It's Rainin' Again"	B-side of "Refugee"	1:32
13.	"Somethin' Else (Live at Hammersmith Odeon, March 7, 1980)" (Sharon Sheeley, Eddie Cochran)	B-side of "Even the Losers"	2:05
14.	"I Don't Know What to Say to You"	B-side of "Listen to Her Heart"	2:28
15.	"King's Highway (Live at Stephen J O'Connell Center, November 4, 1993)"	Non-UK CD B-side of "Something in the Air"	3:30

Disc five: Through the Cracks
No.	Title	Track source	Length
1.	"On the Street" (Benmont Tench)	1973 Mudcrutch outtake	2:10
2.	"Depot Street"	1974 Mudcrutch outtake	3:26
3.	"Cry to Me" (Bert Russell)	1974 Solomon Burke cover by Mudcrutch	3:06
4.	"Don't Do Me Like That"	1974 Mudcrutch version	2:47
5.	"I Can't Fight It"	1974 Mudcrutch outtake	3:00
6.	"Since You Said You Loved Me"	1974 outtake featuring Al Kooper, Jim Gordon, and Emory Gordy	4:40
7.	"Louisiana Rain"	1975 version featuring Al Kooper, Jim Gordon, and Emory Gordy	4:22
8.	"Keeping Me Alive"	Long After Dark outtake	2:59
9.	"Turning Point"	Long After Dark outtake	2:52
10.	"Stop Draggin' My Heart Around" (Petty, Campbell)	Demo from Hard Promises sessions	4:11
11.	"The Apartment Song"	Demo from Southern Accents sessions	2:37
12.	"Big Boss Man" (Al Smith, Luther Dixon)	Southern Accents sessions	2:41
13.	"The Image of Me" (Wayne Kemp)	Southern Accents sessions	2:33
14.	"Moon Pie"	Let Me Up (I've Had Enough) sessions	1:05
15.	"The Damage You've Done (Country version)"	Let Me Up (I've Had Enough) sessions	3:16

Disc six: Nobody's Children
No.	Title	Track source	Length
1.	"Got My Mind Made Up"	Let Me Up (I've Had Enough) sessions	2:51
2.	"Ways to Be Wicked" (Petty, Campbell)	Let Me Up (I've Had Enough) sessions	3:27
3.	"Can't Get Her Out"	Let Me Up (I've Had Enough) sessions	3:11
4.	"Waiting for Tonight (featuring The Bangles on backing vocals)"	Full Moon Fever sessions	3:30
5.	"Travelin'"	1988 outtake	3:15
6.	"Baby, Let's Play House" (Arthur Gunter)	"Mary Jane's Last Dance" sessions"	2:33
7.	"Wooden Heart" (Bert Kaempfert, Kay Twomey, Fred Wise, Ben Weisman)	"Mary Jane's Last Dance" sessions	2:09
8.	"God's Gift to Man"	1992 outtake	4:18
9.	"You Get Me High"	1992 outtake	2:48
10.	"Come on Down to My House"	"Mary Jane's Last Dance" sessions	3:05
11.	"You Come Through (featuring Lenny Kravitz overdubs)" (Petty, Campbell)	Let Me Up (I've Had Enough) sessions	5:15
12.	"Up in Mississippi Tonight"	Debut 1973 A-side for Mudcrutch	3:28

Notes

- In 2015, both Through the Cracks and Nobody's Children were released on digital purchasing and streaming platforms as standalone releases. As of 2020, only Nobody's Children is still available to digitally purchase and stream.

== Personnel ==
Tom Petty and the Heartbreakers

- Ron Blair (most tracks 1976–81, plus "The Best of Everything") – bass guitar, acoustic guitar ("Baby's a Rock 'n' Roller"), backing vocals ("Heartbreakers Beach Party" and "It's Rainin' Again")
- Mike Campbell (all tracks) – lead guitar, rhythm guitar, bass guitar, squeeze box, mandolin, backing vocals ("Heartbreakers Beach Party", "It's Rainin' Again" and "Learning To Fly"), keyboard bass ("Don't Come Around Here No More"), Dobro ("Southern Accents"), koto ("It'll All Work Out"), percussion ("Mike's Life/Mike's World"), keyboards ("All or Nothin'")
- Howie Epstein (most tracks 1982–93) – bass guitar, backing vocals, acoustic lead guitar ("Big Boss Man"), spoken word vocal (via telephone) ("Peace in L.A.")
- Steve Ferrone – drum overdub ("Ways to Be Wicked")
- Stan Lynch (most tracks) – drums, percussion, backing vocals, lead vocal ("Psychotic Reaction")
- Tom Petty (all tracks except disc 2 track 14) – lead vocals, backing vocals, spoken word vocals, whistling, rhythm guitar, lead guitar ("Mary Jane's Last Dance" and "Peace in L.A."), bass guitar, piano, electric piano, harmonica, percussion
- Benmont Tench (most tracks) – piano, electric piano, keyboards, backing vocals, crash cymbal ("It's Rainin' Again"), string synthesizer ("Don't Come Around Here No More")
- Scott Thurston – six-string bass guitar (disc 3 track 13), guitar (disc 4 tracks 5, 7 and 15), slide guitar (disc 4 track 6)

Additional musicians

- Phil Jones – percussion (disc 1 tracks 16–21, disc 2 tracks 1–4 and 8, disc 3 tracks 1–2, 4–5 and 13, disc 4 tracks 2 and 8 and disc 5 tracks 8 and 10), drums (disc 3 tracks 1–2 and 4–5, disc 4 track 10), backing vocal (disc 4 track 2)
- Jeff Lynne – bass guitar (disc 3 tracks 1–4, 7–8, 10–11, and 13 and disc 4 track 10), guitar (disc 3 tracks 1–2, 4–5, 7–8, and 10–11), keyboards (disc 3 tracks 1–3, 7–8, and 11), backing vocals (disc 3 tracks 1–3, 5, 7–11 and 13 and disc 4 track 10), piano (disc 3 tracks 2 and 5), guitar synthesizer (disc 3 track 4), drum machine (disc 3 track 7), sampler (disc 3 track 7), percussion (disc 3 track 13)
- George Drakoulias – percussion overdubs (disc 5 tracks 8–9 and disc 6 tracks 1–5, 9 and 11), drums (disc 5 track 11)
- Jeff Jourard – electric guitar on "Breakdown"
- Phil Seymour – backing vocals on "Breakdown" and "American Girl"
- Randall Marsh – drums on "Hometown Blues"
- Donald "Duck" Dunn – bass guitar on "Hometown Blues", "A Woman in Love (It's Not Me)" and "Stop Draggin' My Heart Around"
- Jim Keltner – percussion on "Refugee", "The Best of Everything" and "Love is a Long Road", drums on "Love Is a Long Road" and "Christmas All Over Again"
- Stevie Nicks – backing vocals on "Insider", "You Can Still Change Your Mind" and "The Apartment Song" (demo)
- Molly Duncan – saxophone on "Rebels" and "Make it Better (Forget About Me)"
- Bobbye Hall – tambourine on "Rebels"
- Dean Garcia – intro bass guitar on "Don't Come Around Here No More"
- Marilyn Martin – backing vocal on "Don't Come Around Here No More"
- Dave Stewart – electric sitar, synthesizer and backing vocal on "Don't Come Around Here No More", guitar on "Make it Better (Forget About Me)"
- Jack Nitzsche – string arrangement on "Southern Accents"
- Gary Chang – synthesizer on "The Best of Everything"
- Garth Hudson – organ on "The Best of Everything"
- Richard Manuel – backing vocal on "The Best of Everything"
- Jerry Hey – horn arrangement on "The Best of Everything"
- George Harrison – acoustic guitar and backing vocal on "I Won't Back Down"
- Robbie Blunt, Kevin Dukes, and Jimmy Rip – acoustic guitars on "Christmas All Over Again"
- Tim Pierce – electric guitar on "Christmas All Over Again"
- Scott Humphrey – synthesizer on "Christmas All Over Again"
- Mitchell Froom – harpsichord on "Christmas All Over Again"
- Shelly Yakus – backing vocals on "Heartbreakers Beach Party" and "It's Rainin' Again"
- Jimmy Iovine – backing vocals on "Heartbreakers Beach Party" and "It's Rainin' Again", telephone ring (sound effect) on "Cracking Up"
- Carlene Carter – spoken word vocal (via telephone) on "Peace in L.A."
- John Sebastian – baritone guitar on "I Don't Know What to Say to You"
- Charlie Souza – bass guitar on "Don't Do Me Like That" (Mudcrutch version)
- Al Kooper – organ and piano on "Since You Said You Loved Me" and "Louisiana Rain"
- Emory Gordy – bass guitar on "Since You Said You Loved Me" and "Louisiana Rain"
- Jim Gordon – drums on "Since You Said You Loved Me" and "Louisiana Rain"
- Susanna Hoffs, Debbi Peterson, Vicki Peterson and Michael Steele – backing vocals on "Waiting for Tonight"
- Lenny Kravitz – drums, bass guitar, backing vocal and spoken word vocal (all overdubs) on "You Come Through"
- Tom Leadon – lead guitar and backing vocal on "Up in Mississippi Tonight"

== VHS/DVD ==
1. "Here Comes My Girl" (1979)
2. "Refugee" (1979)
3. "The Waiting" (1981)
4. "A Woman in Love (It's Not Me)" (1981)
5. "Insider" (1981)
6. "You Got Lucky" (1982)
7. "Change of Heart" (1982)
8. "Don't Come Around Here No More" (1985)
9. "Jammin' Me" (1987)
10. "I Won't Back Down" (1989)
11. "Runnin' Down A Dream" (1989)
12. "Free Fallin'" (1989)
13. "A Face in the Crowd" (1990)
14. "Yer So Bad" (1990)
15. "Learning to Fly" (1991)
16. "Into the Great Wide Open" (1991)
17. "Mary Jane's Last Dance" (1993)

== Certifications ==
Certifications for Playback
Region	Certification	Certified units/sales
United States (RIAA)	Platinum	1,000,000^{^}
^{^} Shipments figures based on certification alone.
