= Runnin' Down a Dream (film) =

2007 film by Peter Bogdanovich

Tom Petty and the Heartbreakers: Runnin' Down a Dream
- Promotional poster
- Directed by: Peter Bogdanovich
- Produced by: Skot Bright; George Drakoulias
- Starring: Tom Petty and the Heartbreakers; Jeff Lynne; Stevie Nicks; Dave Grohl; George Harrison; Eddie Vedder; Rick Rubin
- Edited by: Jeffrey Doe; Mary Ann McClure; Bill Berg-Hillinger; John Gutierrez
- Release date: October 14, 2007 (NYFF)
- Running time: 238 minutes
- Country: United States
- Language: English

Runnin' Down a Dream is a 2007 documentary film about Tom Petty and the Heartbreakers, directed by Peter Bogdanovich. The 4-hour documentary chronicles the history of the band, from its inception as Mudcrutch, right up to the 30th-anniversary concert in Petty's home town of Gainesville, Florida, on September 21, 2006, at the Stephen C. O'Connell Center, University of Florida. The film features interviews with George Harrison, Eddie Vedder, Stevie Nicks, Dave Grohl, Jeff Lynne, Rick Rubin, Johnny Depp, Jackson Browne and more. Petty's solo career is also touched on, as is his time with the Traveling Wilburys.

The film was commercially released as part of a four-disc box set. The film spanned the first two discs, while the 30th anniversary concert and a CD of rare tracks were the components of the remaining two discs. On October 28, 2008, a two-disc version set of the film, featuring previously unreleased bonus performances, but not the Gainesville concert or audio CD, was released to the public. Runnin' Down a Dream was released on Blu-ray Disc on November 15, 2010.

== DVD track listing ==
=== Disc 1 ===
"Main Feature DVD (Part 1)"

1. Gainesville 2006
2. Elvis
3. What's in a Name
4. Mike
5. Benmont
6. B.Y.O.F. (Build Your Own Festival)
7. Fast Forward
8. Deals
9. A Broken Bond
10. Ron & Stan
11. Tom Petty and the Heartbreakers
12. Third
13. Fuel
14. Howie
15. Poet

=== Disc 2 ===
"Main Feature DVD (Part 2)"

1. Bob Dylan
2. Strange Coincidences
3. Scott
4. The Bottom Line
5. Steve
6. John
7. Round Trip
8. Rock & Roll Heaven
9. Runnin' Down a Dream (End credits)

=== Disc 3 ===
"One 30th Anniversary Concert DVD"

1. "Listen to Her Heart" (Tom Petty)
2. "Mary Jane's Last Dance" (Tom Petty)
3. "I Won't Back Down" (Tom Petty, Jeff Lynne)
4. "Free Fallin'" (Tom Petty, Jeff Lynne)
5. "Saving Grace" (Tom Petty)
6. "I'm a Man" (Ellas McDaniel, Koko Taylor)
7. "Oh Well" (Peter Green)
8. "Handle with Care" (Bob Dylan, George Harrison, Jeff Lynne, Roy Orbison, Tom Petty)
9. "Stop Draggin' My Heart Around" (with Stevie Nicks) (Tom Petty, Mike Campbell)
10. "I Need to Know" (with Stevie Nicks) (Tom Petty)
11. "It's Good to Be King" (Tom Petty)
12. "Down South" (Tom Petty)
13. "Southern Accents" (Tom Petty)
14. "Insider" (with Stevie Nicks) (Tom Petty)
15. "Learning to Fly" (Tom Petty, Jeff Lynne)
16. "Don't Come Around Here No More" (Tom Petty, Dave Stewart)
17. "Runnin' Down a Dream" (Tom Petty, Jeff Lynne, Mike Campbell)
18. "You Wreck Me" (Tom Petty, Mike Campbell)
19. "Mystic Eyes" (Van Morrison)
20. "American Girl" (Tom Petty)

=== Disc 4 ===
"Bonus Soundtrack CD"

1. "Breakdown" (Tom Petty) – Rehearsal 1977, Los Angeles, CA
2. "Anything That's Rock 'n' Roll" (Tom Petty) – Top Of The Pops, UK, June 16, 1977
3. "Fooled Again (I Don't Like It)" (Tom Petty) – Old Grey Whistle Test, UK, June 20, 1978
4. "American Girl" (Tom Petty) – Fridays, June 6, 1980
5. "Shadow of a Doubt (A Complex Kid)" (Tom Petty) – Fridays, June 6, 1980
6. "Stories We Could Tell" (John Sebastian) – Recorded at the Record Plant, Hollywood, CA, 1982
7. "Keeping Me Alive" (Tom Petty) – Recorded at the Record Plant, Hollywood, CA, 1982
8. "Honey Bee" (Tom Petty) – Saturday Night Live, November 19, 1994
9. "Lost Highway" (Leon Payne) – Rehearsal at CenterStaging, Burbank, CA, May 19, 2006

== Reception ==
The film received mostly positive feedback from film critics. The review aggregation website Rotten Tomatoes reports that 100% of critics gave the film a positive review based on five reviews, with an average score of 8.1/10.

Nick Schager of Slant Magazine reviewed the documentary saying, "Employs a warm and leisurely, though never sluggish, pace that's upfront about Bogdanovich's intention to take his sweet time tackling every topic of relevant interest."

Ronnie Schreib of Variety, reviewed it saying: "A feast for Petty fans and a joyous confirmation of the vitality of the collective creative process we." Dan Lybarger, of eFilmCritic.com, said: "Peter Bogdanovich's new documentary about the life and career of Florida-born rocker Tom Petty runs nearly four hours and never fails to engage or entertain."

=== Accolades ===
The film won a Grammy for Best Music Film.

== Personnel ==
- Tom Petty – vocals, guitar, percussion (on Disc 3, track 6)
- Mike Campbell – guitar
- Benmont Tench – keyboards, backing vocals
- Ron Blair – bass, backing vocals (on Disc 3, and Disc 4, tracks 1–5 & 9)
- Scott Thurston – guitar, synthesizer, harmonica, vocals (on Disc 3, and Disc 4, tracks 8 & 9)
- Steve Ferrone – drums, percussion (on Disc 3, and Disc 4, track 9)
- Stevie Nicks – vocals, tambourine on "Stop Draggin' My Heart Around", "I Need to Know", "Insider", "Learning to Fly", "Don't Come Around Here No More" and "American Girl" (on Disc 3)
- Howie Epstein – bass, backing vocals (on Disc 4, tracks 6–8)
- Stan Lynch – drums, percussion, backing vocals (on Disc 4, tracks 1–7)
- Phil Jones – percussion (on Disc 4, tracks 6 & 7)
- Dave Grohl – drums (on Disc 4, track 8)

== Book ==
- Petty, Tom; Bogdanovich, Peter (October 25, 2007). Zanes, Warren (ed.). Runnin' Down a Dream: Tom Petty and the Heartbreakers. Chronicle Books. ISBN 978-0-811-86201-1 – via archive.org.
