= Jammin' Me =

Single by Tom Petty and the Heartbreakers

from the album Let Me Up (I've Had Enough)
- B-side: "Make That Connection"
- Released: April 6, 1987
- Genre: Heartland rock; garage rock; new wave
- Length: 4:08
- Label: MCA
- Composer: Mike Campbell
- Lyricists: Tom Petty; Bob Dylan

Tom Petty and the Heartbreakers singles chronology
| "So You Want to Be a Rock 'n' Roll Star" (1986) | "Jammin' Me" (1987) | "All Mixed Up" (1987) |

"Jammin' Me" is a song by Tom Petty and the Heartbreakers, co-written by Bob Dylan, Tom Petty, and Mike Campbell that first appeared on the band's 1987 album Let Me Up (I've Had Enough), and was later included on Petty's 'best of' albums Playback and Anthology: Through the Years.

== Background and lyrics ==
In a November 2003 interview with Songfacts, guitarist Mike Campbell explained the song's origins:

"Jammin Me" was interesting because I wrote the track and gave it to Tom, and he held it for a while and didn't do anything with it. Then I guess he was working with Bob one day, and they came up with some words — I guess they were picking words out of a newspaper or off the television, and Tom said 'Oh, I've got this track of Mike's' and they inserted those words over the track. I wasn't there when Bob wrote the words to it, but I was pretty thrilled to hear that he had contributed to it. We just went in and recreated the demo to it.

On the True Confessions tour between Petty and Dylan (who both later became members of the Traveling Wilburys), they collaborated on this track which became the opening song on their album, Let Me Up (I've Had Enough). The song is about a man "overwhelmed by the volume of disconnected 'news' generated in the disinformation age" containing a "laundry list" of 1980s celebrities such as Eddie Murphy, Joe Piscopo, and Vanessa Redgrave, and "the apple in young Steve's eye" referring to Steve Jobs at Apple Inc., among others. It follows in line with an ongoing theme throughout the album of people "who are reeling from media assaults and shattered relationships", but have a strong desire to survive in order to make sense of the world. Some lyrics came from Dylan and Petty picking words out of a newspaper and off the television.

Petty later commented that "the verse about Eddie Murphy, that was all Bob [Dylan]. Which embarrassed me a little bit because I remember seeing Eddie Murphy on TV really pissed off about it. I had nothing against Eddie Murphy or Vanessa Redgrave. What [Dylan] was talking about was media overload and being slammed with so many things at once. And times were changing; there weren't four television channels anymore."

== Release and reception ==
"Jammin' Me" was released as the first single from Let Me Up (I've Had Enough) in 1987, reaching No. 1 in the Billboard Album Rock Tracks chart, as well as No. 18 on the Billboard Hot 100. It became Petty's third single to hit No. 1 on the Album Rock (later known as Mainstream Rock) chart and stayed there for four weeks; previous songs to top this chart were "The Waiting" in 1981 and "You Got Lucky" in 1982. Critics were generally favorable towards the single with AllMusic comparing it to the Rolling Stones song "Start Me Up", saying "the fabulous groove is positively infectious". Rolling Stone complimented Petty and Campbell's "raw guitar chords" and Benmont Tench's "honky-tonk piano fills". Cash Box said it features a "strong, earnest vocal and a gritty, guitar-based production."

The song became a standard in Petty's live sets with "astounding results", though it was not actually played as often as other songs which remained more popular. When "Jammin' Me" was performed during the Heartbreakers' impressive multi-performances at the Fillmore in 1997 and 1999, Petty played lead guitar, rather than Campbell. Despite the high chart position, the song failed to appear on their 1993 Greatest Hits album, but did appear on the compilations Playback and Anthology: Through the Years, as well as the posthumous collection The Best of Everything.

== Personnel ==
- Tom Petty – lead and backing vocals
- Mike Campbell – lead and rhythm guitars, bass guitar, percussion
- Benmont Tench – piano, organ
- Stan Lynch – drums, percussion

== Charts ==
| Chart (1987) | Peak position |
|---|---|
| Canadian RPM Top Singles | 41 |
| New Zealand (Recorded Music NZ) | 38 |
| US Billboard Hot 100 | 18 |
| US Mainstream Rock Airplay (Billboard) | 1 |
