= Mystic Eyes =

Single by Them

from the album The Angry Young Them
- B-side: "If You And I Could Be As Two" (Morrison)
- Released: 12 November 1965 (UK); October 1965 (US)
- Genre: British R&B; garage rock
- Length: 2:43
- Label: Decca Records (UK); Parrot Records (US)
- Songwriter: Van Morrison
- Producer: Tommy Scott

Them singles chronology
"Here Comes the Night" (1965)	"Mystic Eyes" (1965)	"Call My Name" (1966)

"Mystic Eyes" is a song written by Northern Irish singer-songwriter Van Morrison when he was leader of the band Them. It was the opening tune for the band's first album, The Angry Young Them that was released in June 1965. It was released as a single in the US in October 1965 and in the UK on 12 November 1965. It charted at No. 33 in the US but did not chart in the UK.

== Recording history ==
In 1965, Van Morrison explained to a Belfast reporter how the song had just happened during the first recording session for the album and the band was just "busking" around. "Someone started playing a fast riff and we all just joined in. The lyrics I sing at the end were just words from a song I had been writing at the time." Later in 1966 he told an American reporter how it was inspired by an occasion in Nottingham Park as he walked by a graveyard wall where some children played next to it. "You know, man, there was life and death beside one another so close...yet so different...And then I thought of the bright lights in the children's eyes...and the cloudy lights in the eyes of the dead."

Tommy Scott who was acting producer of Them sessions after Bert Berns returned to America described how "Mystic Eyes" came about in the studio as being originally conceived as an instrumental: "After blowing his harmonica for about seven minutes, Van suddenly burst into this spontaneous lyric." The ten-minute take was condensed to a single's length by cutting from the beginning and ending of the instrumental. It was recorded at the Regent Sound, a mono studio in Denmark Street in London England. The lead guitar runs on the song were provided by Jimmy Page, then a relatively-unknown session guitarist.

== Aftermath ==
"Mystic Eyes" was not released as a single until four months after the album that it was the opening song on. It was the follow-up single release to "(It Won't Hurt) Half As Much", which failed to chart in either the UK or the US. "Mystic Eyes" was a successful single in the US, but in the UK it failed to chart. It was Them's second-most successful single release in the US ("Here Comes the Night" being the most successful).

Billboard said of the song that "with a hard driving Bo Diddley beat and a far-out lyric, this group has a hot winner here." Billboard also praised the harmonica playing. Greil Marcus said about hearing "Mystic Eyes" for the first time: "I'd never heard anything like that. A piece of music that was supposedly made for airplay, with this long instrumental introduction that was really the whole song." Marcus also wrote in a 1969 Rolling Stone article on Van Morrison: "'Mystic Eyes' though, was a triumph for both Van as an artist responsible to no one but himself, and for the band. Van wrote it after watching children frolicking among the tombstones of an ancient cemetery, and the vocal consisted in the essence of Van chanting virtually demonic incantations over a mad tempo and the harsh chords of a biting guitar."

This song heavily influenced the Grateful Dead song, "Caution, Do Not Stop on Tracks". In the Dead's earliest recorded versions, the influence is clear.

== Other releases ==
This was one of the songs included on the compilation album, The Story of Them Featuring Van Morrison released in 1997 on the Deram Records label.

== In the media ==
This song was featured in the HBO series The Sopranos, and appears on the 2000 release of The Sopranos: Music from the HBO Original Series.

== Cover versions ==
Tom Petty & The Heartbreakers frequently covered "Mystic Eyes" in concert. A 2006 performance was included in the 4-disc version of the documentary on Tom Petty, entitled Runnin' Down a Dream. A different 2006 version is also included on their 4-CD collection, The Live Anthology.
