= Even the Losers =

1979 song by Tom Petty and the Heartbreakers

Single by Tom Petty and the Heartbreakers

from the album Damn the Torpedoes
- B-side: "Somethin' Else" (live); "Stories We Could Tell" (live)
- Released: July 1980
- Recorded: 1979
- Genre: Heartland rock; power pop; garage rock
- Length: 3:38 (album version); 3:59 (single version)
- Label: Backstreet
- Songwriter: Tom Petty
- Producers: Tom Petty; Jimmy Iovine

Tom Petty and the Heartbreakers singles chronology
"Here Comes My Girl" (1980)	"Even the Losers" (1980)	"The Waiting" (1981)

"Even the Losers" is a song by American rock band Tom Petty and the Heartbreakers that appears as the third track on their third studio album, Damn the Torpedoes (1979). It is also featured on the band's 1993 Greatest Hits album. A live recording of it is included in the box set The Live Anthology. It has become one of the highest regarded songs of Petty's repertoire.

The song was not released as a single, except in Australia, but peaked at #11 on the Billboard's LyricFind U.S. chart in 2017.

== Background and recording ==
The song was inspired by a night Petty had spent with a woman named Cindy and some friends in his hometown of Gainesville, Florida when he was young. Cindy had been the object of a junior high school crush of his. Unlike in school, Cindy liked him that night. It was also during that night Petty had an epiphany and realized he needed to be in a rock and roll band. The next morning Cindy said their relationship was limited to the previous night. Years later, that night was very much on his mind when he wrote "Even the Losers."

During the recording session, guitarist Mike Campbell struggled to come up with a guitar solo. Petty asked, "Well, what would Chuck Berry do?" Within minutes, the solo was recorded.

== Composition ==
According to the music sheet published at Musicnotes.com by Universal Music Publishing Group, "Even the Losers" is a heartland rock song. It is set in the time signature of common time and composed in a moderately fast tempo of 140 beats per minute. The song was written by Tom Petty in the key of D major, with his vocals spanning from A4 to G5.

A female voice at the beginning of the track says, "It's just the normal noises in here!" The voice is Campbell's wife, Marcie, from a demo recording Campbell had made in his home, replying after he had complained about the noise of a nearby washing machine. She followed up with "If you were here more often, you'd know that!" according to his biography.

== Critical reception ==
Rolling Stone ranked the song at 19 of Petty's greatest songs, ranked above other songs that were successful singles, such as "You Got Lucky" and "Jammin' Me". Corbin Reiff of Uproxx ranked it at 15 of Petty's best songs. The Washington Post included "Even the Losers" on their list of 10 of Petty's best songs.

Writing for Uproxx, critic John Kurp wrote, "'Even The Losers' sums up Petty's career more than any other track in his hits-stuff discography" and the song "is the sound of pure pain. It's an ode for anyone stuck in the 'glory days,' for the lovesick fools who can't separate the good times ('We smoked cigarettes and we stared at the moon') from the bad ('I shoulda known right then it was too good to last'), and how much that hurts. And yet, I see 'Even the Losers' as somewhat optimistic."

== Personnel ==
- Tom Petty – vocals, rhythm guitar
- Mike Campbell – lead guitar
- Ron Blair – bass guitar
- Stan Lynch – drums
- Benmont Tench – piano, organ

== Cover versions ==
- In 2012, Pat Green covered "Even the Losers" for his cover album, Songs We Wish We'd Written II.
- In 2017, Ryan Adams performed the song at the Austin City Limits Music Festival as a tribute to Petty.
- Fitz and the Tantrums covered "Even the Losers" for the soundtrack of the 2024 Apple TV+ series Bad Monkey.
