= I Won't Back Down =

1989 single by Tom Petty

Single by Tom Petty

from the album Full Moon Fever
- B-side: "The Apartment Song"; "Don't Treat Me Like a Stranger"
- Released: April 1989
- Genre: Heartland rock
- Length: 2:59
- Label: MCA
- Songwriters: Tom Petty; Jeff Lynne
- Producers: Jeff Lynne; Tom Petty; Mike Campbell

Tom Petty singles chronology
"All Mixed Up" (1987)	"I Won't Back Down" (1989)	"Runnin' Down a Dream" (1989)

Music video
- "I Won't Back Down" on YouTube

"I Won't Back Down" is a song by the American rock musician Tom Petty. It was released in April 1989 as the lead single from his first solo album, Full Moon Fever. The song was co-written by Petty and Jeff Lynne, his writing partner for the album. It reached number 12 on the Billboard Hot 100 and topped the Album Rock Tracks chart for five weeks, starting the album's road to multi-platinum status.

== Recording ==
Petty has said the following about the recording of the song: "At the session George Harrison sang and played the guitar. I had a terrible cold that day, and George went to the store and bought a ginger root, boiled it and had me stick my head in the pot to get the ginger steam to open up my sinuses, and then I ran in and did the take." The song was written in response to an arson incident that took place at Petty's home in 1987.

In the 2007 documentary Runnin' Down a Dream, Petty said that he felt some initial hesitation about releasing the song, given how straightforwardly it conveys its message.

== Composition ==
The song is written in G major and played in common time with a tempo of 114 beats per minute.

== Critical reception ==
Jerry Smith, reviewer of British music newspaper Music Week, called "I Won't Back Down" an "extremely catchy, chugging rocker" and expressed the opinion that Jeff Lynne's production "is sure to leave its mark in the build up to the release of his forthcoming LP". Music & Media found it to be "rootsy, very American rock with country overtones. Simple and charming with a nostalgic, early 70s production". The scathing review from New Musical Express was written as a message to young readers, with the caveat that "Tom Petty is the man who plays the irritating parts" on the recordings of the then-active Traveling Wilburys. And this work is a clear demonstration of those very irritating parts. Melody Maker's review was also laced with sarcasm. The reviewer simply ridiculed the tough rocker's desire to confront an unknown and incomprehensible threat.

== September 11 attacks ==
Due to its themes, the song was played often on American radio following the September 11 attacks. Petty and the Heartbreakers played a quiet but resolute version of the song at the America: A Tribute to Heroes telethon.

== Agreement with Sam Smith ==
In January 2015, it was revealed that an agreement had been reached whereby Petty and Jeff Lynne would be credited as co-writers of Sam Smith's song "Stay with Me" and receive 12.5% of its royalties. Petty's publishing company had contacted Smith's publisher after noticing a likeness between "Stay with Me" and "I Won't Back Down". Petty clarified that he did not believe Smith plagiarized him, saying "All my years of songwriting have shown me these things can happen. Most times you catch it before it gets out the studio door but in this case it got by. Sam's people were very understanding of our predicament and we easily came to an agreement". Smith claimed not to have heard "I Won't Back Down" before writing "Stay with Me", but acknowledged the similarity after listening to the song, calling it "a complete coincidence".

Petty and Lynne were not eligible for a Grammy Award ("Stay with Me" was nominated for three awards at the 57th annual ceremony, winning two of them) as the Recording Academy considered "Stay with Me" to have been interpolated from "I Won't Back Down" by Smith, James Napier, and William Phillips, the writers of "Stay with Me"; Petty and Lynne were instead given certificates to honor their participation in the work, as is usual for writers of work which is sampled or interpolated by others.

== Personnel ==
- Tom Petty – lead vocals and backing vocals, acoustic guitar
- Mike Campbell – electric guitar
- George Harrison – acoustic guitar and backing vocals
- Jeff Lynne – bass, synthesizer and backing vocals
- Howie Epstein – backing vocals
- Phil Jones – drums

Campbell, Harrison, and Lynne also appear in the music video for "I Won't Back Down" with Harrison's former Beatles bandmate, Ringo Starr, playing drums; despite Starr not playing on the recording.

== Charts ==
=== Weekly charts ===
Chart (1989)	Peak position
Australia (ARIA)	16
Canada Top Singles (RPM)	5
Italy Airplay (Music & Media)	10
New Zealand (Recorded Music NZ)	49
UK Singles (Official Charts)	28
US Billboard Hot 100	12
US Mainstream Rock (Billboard)	1
US Alternative Airplay (Billboard)	29
West Germany (GfK)	66

=== Year-end charts ===
Chart (1989)	Position
Australia (ARIA)	97
Canada Top Singles (RPM)	40

== Certifications ==
Region	Certification	Certified units/sales
New Zealand (RMNZ)	3× Platinum	90,000^{‡}
United Kingdom (BPI)	Gold	400,000^{‡}
^{‡} Sales+streaming figures based on certification alone.

== Use in political campaigns and events ==
George W. Bush used "I Won't Back Down" at campaign events during the 2000 presidential campaign but was compelled to stop using the song after receiving a cease and desist letter from Petty's publisher. Petty then went on to perform the song at Al Gore's home after Gore conceded the election to President Bush. Jim Webb used the song for his successful bid for one of Virginia's U.S. Senate seats in 2006, as did Hillary Clinton during the 2008 Democratic presidential primary campaign. The song was also used at campaign events for Congressman Ron Paul of Texas during the 2008 Republican presidential primary campaign, as well as for events for his Campaign for Liberty. The song was also played at an event for Republican Connecticut gubernatorial nominee, Tom Foley.

In June 2020, Petty's family issued a cease and desist letter to President Donald Trump's campaign for its use of "I Won't Back Down" at Trump's rally in Tulsa on June 20, 2020. The letter stated: "Trump was in no way authorized to use this song to further a campaign that leaves too many Americans and common sense behind. Both the late Tom Petty and his family firmly stand against racism and discrimination of any kind. Tom Petty would never want a song of his used for a campaign of hate. He liked to bring people together."

In November 2020, President-elect Joe Biden and Vice President-elect Kamala Harris played "I Won't Back Down" at their victory speech in Wilmington, Delaware. Petty's family wrote on Instagram that they were "touched to see Tom included on such an important night in America".

== Use in sports campaigns ==
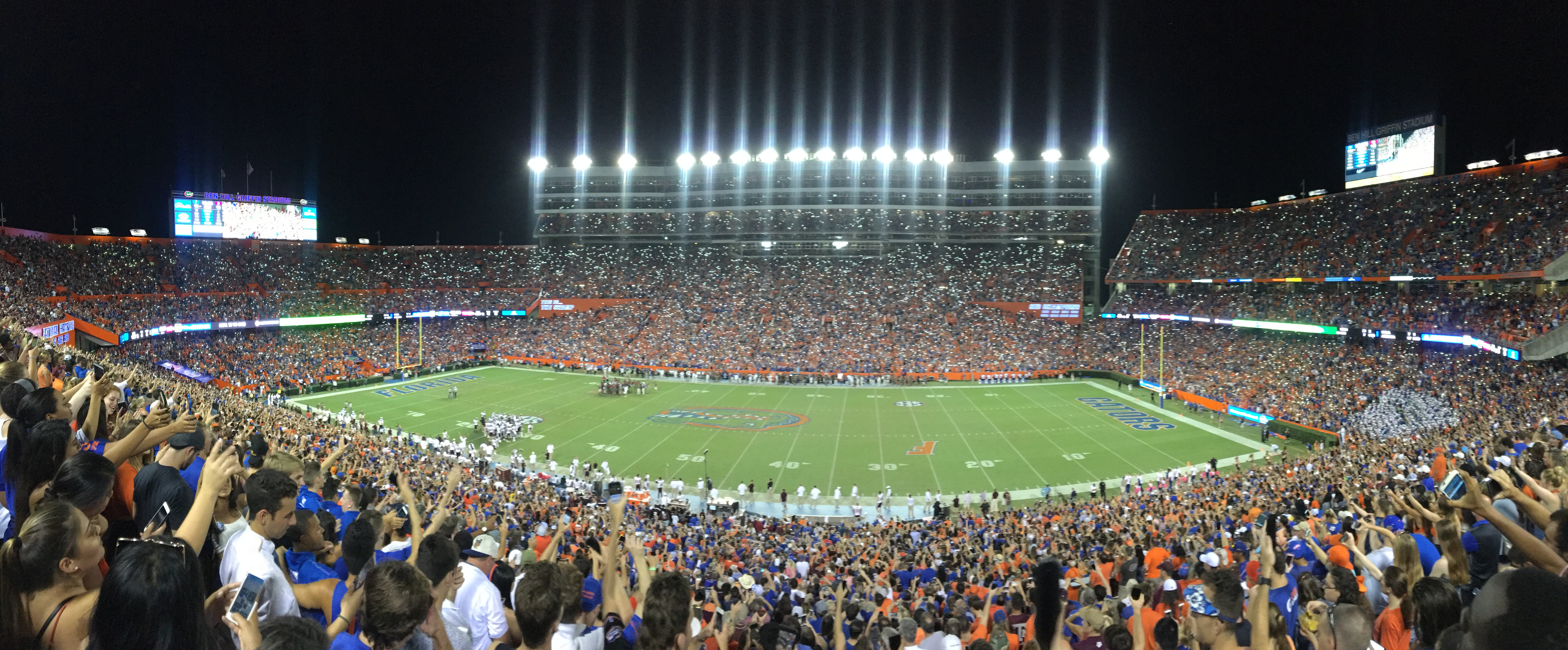
Fans singing "I Won't Back Down" at Florida Field, University of Florida

- Playing the song has become a tradition at Florida Gators football games at the University of Florida in Gainesville, Petty's hometown. Petty died unexpectedly on October 2, 2017, and at the next home football game vs. LSU the following Saturday, "I Won't Back Down" was played between the third and fourth quarters immediately after the traditional university song "We Are the Boys from Old Florida". It has been played at that time at every subsequent Gator home game, with fans singing along and holding aloft cell phones to fill the stadium with lights. It has also been played at every Florida Gators men's basketball home game since 2024.
- The Ottawa Senators used the song as a campaign anthem in December 1990 at their presentation to be awarded an NHL franchise at the Breakers Hotel in Palm Beach, Florida. The unlikely bid received unanimous support from the NHL and the franchise was awarded on December 6, 1990.
- The TCU Horned Frogs used the song as their slogan during the 2009 season, and incorporated it into their merchandise during the year.
- The Johnny Cash cover of the song from the album American III: Solitary Man was used for a Rogers Sportsnet advertising campaign for the 2010-2011 NHL season.
- UFC fighter Chris Weidman used the song for his walkout music throughout his career, most notably at UFC 162 when he fought Middleweight Champion Anderson Silva. Going into the fight as the underdog, Weidman upset the Champion and was the first person to beat Silva in almost 7 years. Because of the fitting lyrics, this has often been regarded as one of the best UFC walkouts of all time.

== All appearances ==
- Full Moon Fever (1989)
- Greatest Hits (1993)
- Playback (1995)
- Anthology: Through the Years (2000)
- America: A Tribute to Heroes (2001)
- Barnyard (2006) (Note: Performed by Sam Elliot.)
- The Live Anthology (2009)
- Mojo Tour 2010 (2010) – live version
