= A Woman in Love (It's Not Me) =

Single by Tom Petty and the Heartbreakers

from the album Hard Promises
- B-side: "Gator on the Lawn"
- Released: June 29, 1981
- Recorded: 1981
- Genre: Hard rock; R&B
- Length: 4:21
- Label: Backstreet
- Songwriters: Tom Petty; Mike Campbell
- Producers: Tom Petty; Jimmy Iovine

Tom Petty and the Heartbreakers singles chronology
"The Waiting" (1981)	"A Woman in Love (It's Not Me)" (1981)	"Stop Draggin' My Heart Around" (1981)

"A Woman in Love (It's Not Me)" is a song recorded by American rock band Tom Petty and the Heartbreakers. It was released in June 1981 as the second single from their album Hard Promises. It peaked at number 79 on the U.S. Billboard Hot 100 chart.

Billboard called it the "most dramatic track" on Hard Promises, saying that "Petty's emotion-filled vocals are delivered in classic rock fashion while the riveting guitar work gives the tune its punch." Record World praised "Petty's lonesome vocal and the foreboding guitars".

== Musicians ==
- Tom Petty - vocals, rhythm guitar
- Mike Campbell - lead guitar
- Benmont Tench - keyboards
- Stan Lynch - drums
- Duck Dunn - bass guitar
- Phil Jones - percussion

== Chart performance ==
Chart (1981)	Peak position
U.S. Billboard Hot 100	79
U.S. Billboard Album Rock Tracks	5
