= Change of Heart (Tom Petty and the Heartbreakers song) =

Single by Tom Petty and the Heartbreakers

from the album Long After Dark
- B-side: "Heartbreakers Beach Party"
- Released: February 1983
- Recorded: 1982
- Genre: Heartland rock; power pop
- Length: 3:19
- Label: Backstreet
- Songwriter: Tom Petty
- Producers: Tom Petty; Jimmy Iovine

Tom Petty and the Heartbreakers singles chronology
| "You Got Lucky" (1982) | "Change of Heart" (1983) | "Don't Come Around Here No More" (1985) |

Red vinyl issue
- Limited edition release

"Change of Heart" is a song recorded by American rock band Tom Petty and the Heartbreakers. It was released in February 1983 as the third single from their fifth album Long After Dark. It peaked at number 21 on the U.S. Billboard Hot 100 chart. The B side, "Heartbreakers Beach Party," was exclusive to this single and remained unreleased on CD until its inclusion on the 1995 box set Playback.

== Background ==
Petty was inspired to write "Change of Heart" based on The Move's 1972 single "Do Ya". Petty was very inspired by the way Jeff Lynne had used chords on the track, and wanted to use the same "crunchy" guitar riff that was used on "Do Ya". After that, the lyrics and title came and the song was completed.

== Reception ==
Cash Box said that Petty's "chiming guitar" and "ultra-nasal" vocal, as well as "a rock steady beat and elaborate percussion" allow the singer to express his feelings.

== Chart performance ==
=== Weekly charts ===
| Chart (1983) | Peak position |
|---|---|
| Canadian RPM Top Singles | 36 |
| U.S. Billboard Hot 100 | 21 |

=== Year-end charts ===
| Chart (1983) | Rank |
|---|---|
| U.S. (Joel Whitburn's Pop Annual) | 128 |

== Limited edition ==
The first 100,000 copies in the US were pressed on red vinyl and came in a stickered transparent sleeve.
