= I Need to Know (Tom Petty and the Heartbreakers song) =

Single by Tom Petty and the Heartbreakers

from the album You're Gonna Get It!
- B-side: "No Second Thoughts"
- Released: June 1978
- Recorded: Late 1977
- Studio: Shelter Studios, Hollywood
- Genre: Hard rock; power pop
- Length: 2:26
- Label: Shelter
- Songwriter: Tom Petty
- Producers: Denny Cordell; Noah Shark; Tom Petty

Tom Petty and the Heartbreakers singles chronology
"Anything That's Rock 'n' Roll" (1977)	"I Need to Know" (1978)	"Listen to Her Heart" (1978)

"I Need to Know" is a song written by Tom Petty and recorded by American rock band Tom Petty and the Heartbreakers. It was released in 1978 as the first single from their second album You're Gonna Get It!. It peaked at #41 on the Billboard Hot 100 singles chart in 1978. This song as well as "Listen to Her Heart" was already being played live in concert as early as June 14, 1977, as is evidenced in a performance on Germany's music television show "Rockpalast".

Cash Box said that it is "hard driving rock 'n' roll" and that "the hook repeats hypnotically as the guitars drive the message home." Record World called it an "energetic rocker."

== Other versions ==
Stevie Nicks has been performing "I Need to Know" live in her solo concerts since 1981. Nicks also performed this song with Petty together on his 30th anniversary concert (which was filmed and released on DVD as Runnin' Down a Dream).

In 1981 the Swedish band Gyllene Tider recorded a version of the song with Swedish lyrics, written by singer Per Gessle (the male half of Roxette), named "Vill ha ett svar!"

Poison recorded a cover of the song for their 2007 album Poison'd!.

Hour of the Wolf recorded a cover for their 2012 greatest hits album, Decompositions Vol. II.

Following Petty's death on October 2, 2017, Local H have been playing the song in concert.

In 2020, Starcrawler previewed a cover of the song for Tom Petty's 70th Birthday Bash on SiriusXM, featuring Mike Campbell on rhythm guitar. The band later officially released the cover as a single on music streaming services.

In 2023, Ten Cent Revenge recorded a cover of the song for their second EP Fast Forward, featuring Cherie Currie on co-lead vocals. The group performed the song live alongside Currie on March 21st, 2024, at the Whisky A Go-Go in West Hollywood, California, as the opening act for Pat Travers.

== All appearances ==
- You're Gonna Get It!
- Pack Up The Plantation: Live!
- Greatest Hits
- Playback
- Anthology: Through The Years
- The Live Anthology
- This song is part of the soundtrack in Rock Band 3.

== Charts ==
Chart (1978)	Peak position
Canadian RPM Top Singles	46
U.S. Billboard Hot 100	41
U.S. Cash Box Top 100	53

== See also ==
- 1978 in music
