= Peace in L.A. =

Single by Tom Petty and the Heartbreakers
- B-side: "Peace in L.A." (Peace Mix)
- Released: May 26, 1992
- Recorded: April 30, 1992
- Genre: Pop rock
- Length: 4:59
- Label: MCA
- Songwriter: Tom Petty
- Producers: Tom Petty; Mike Campbell

Tom Petty and the Heartbreakers singles chronology
"Into the Great Wide Open" (1991)	"Peace in L.A." (1992)	"Something in the Air" (1993)

Music video
- "Peace in L.A." on YouTube

"Peace in L.A." is a charity single by American rock band Tom Petty and the Heartbreakers. The song was written in tribute to victims of the 1992 Los Angeles riots, and was released as a non-album single that same year.

== Background ==
The riots broke out the day Petty and the Heartbreakers came back home from a European tour. Petty was living in Los Angeles when it happened, and he witnessed the events unfold on TV. Horrified by the tragedy, he quickly retreated to his room and wrote the entire song in minutes. He then gathered the Heartbreakers for an impromptu studio session to record the song in its entirety the next day. Bassist Howie Epstein's failure to arrive resulted in his sole contribution to the track being a spoken word segment ("What's burning? I think I smell smoke") only used on the Peace Mix, recorded over the phone where Petty unsuccessfully tried to record his backing vocals. "I think he was talking about something on the stove. It fit the situation, so we left it in," Petty said. The single was released to radio stations and debuted at The Walls of Justice, an event held by Warner Bros. Studios to call for an end to the riots, on May 1. It was released commercially on CD and cassette May 26, but failed to chart. All proceeds and royalties generated were donated to support victims of the riots. Petty later revealed, “To this day I still get letters of thanks from missions in East L.A. because the money keeps coming in. I felt good because it did some good." The music video, which entered rotation on MTV and VH1 in May 1992, used actual footage of fires burning and people running wild in the streets during the riots, including a short clip of the infamous beating of Rodney King.

== Reception ==
Professional ratings
Review scores
Source	Rating
AllMusic	2/5 stars

Retrospective reviews for the song have been mostly unfavorable, with AllMusic's Stephen Thomas Erlewine remarking that it "would have sat on the shelf if it hadn't been for politics and protest." Amber Frost with Dangerous Minds gave an negative review, saying that "this particular incident simply did not require Tom Petty’s musical commentary." Rolling Stone, however, was less judgemental, including it at No. 44 on their list of Petty's 50 greatest songs.
