= Listen to Her Heart =

Single by Tom Petty and the Heartbreakers

from the album You're Gonna Get It!
- B-side: "I Don't Know What to Say to You"; "I Fought the Law / Route 66 (Live in Boston, July 1978)" (UK 12" limited edition)
- Released: August 30, 1978
- Recorded: Shelter Studios, Hollywood
- Genre: Rock; power pop
- Length: 3:05
- Label: Shelter
- Songwriter: Tom Petty
- Producers: Denny Cordell; Noah Shark; Tom Petty

Tom Petty and the Heartbreakers singles chronology
"I Need to Know" (1978)	"Listen to Her Heart" (1978)	"Don't Do Me Like That" (1979)

"Listen to Her Heart" is a song recorded by American rock band Tom Petty and the Heartbreakers. It was released in August 1978 as the second single from their second album, You're Gonna Get It!. It peaked at number 59 on the Billboard Hot 100 singles chart in October 1978. This song as well as "I Need to Know" was already being played live as early as June 14, 1977 as is evidenced in Germany's music television show, Rockpalast.

== Background and content ==
Petty wrote the song as a response to Ike Turner making advances toward Petty's wife at the time.

ABC Records pushed for the mention cocaine in the opening lyrics to be changed to the more radio-friendly lyric "champagne", but Petty refused. As a result, the song received limited airplay.

== Reception ==
"Listen to Her Heart" was ranked number five on Billboard's list of Petty's 20 greatest songs and on Rolling Stone's list of Petty's 50 greatest songs. Cash Box said it has "an emphatic guitar opening" and "the story of an independent woman." Record World said the song "sounds a bit like Buddy Holly and has all the elements of a pop natural."

== All appearances ==
- You're Gonna Get It!
- Greatest Hits
- Playback
- Anthology: Through the Years
- Mojo Tour 2010: Expanded Edition (Live Version)
- The song was featured as playable track in the 2010 music game Guitar Hero: Warriors of Rock.
- An American Treasure (2018)

== Charts ==
Chart (1978)	Peak position
Canadian RPM Top Singles	66
U.S. Billboard Hot 100	59
