= Greatest Hits (Tom Petty album) =

- Original album cover

Greatest hits album by Tom Petty and the Heartbreakers
- Released: November 16, 1993
- Recorded: 1976–1993
- Genres: Rock; heartland rock
- Length: 65:44
- Labels: MCA; Geffen
- Producers: Mike Campbell; Denny Cordell; Jimmy Iovine; Jeff Lynne; Tom Petty; Rick Rubin; Noah Shark; David A. Stewart

Tom Petty and the Heartbreakers chronology
| Into the Great Wide Open (1991) | Greatest Hits (1993) | Wildflowers (1994) |

Singles from Greatest Hits
- 1. "Something in the Air" Released: October 18, 1993; 2. "Mary Jane's Last Dance" Released: November 16, 1993

Professional ratings
Review scores
| Source | Rating |
|---|---|
| AllMusic | 5/5 stars |
| Blender | 5/5 stars |
| Christgau's Consumer Guide | A− |
| The Encyclopedia of Popular Music | 4/5 stars |
| Entertainment Weekly | A+ |
| The Essential Rock Discography | 9/10 |
| MusicHound Rock | 4.5/5 stars |
| Q | 4/5 stars |
| The Rolling Stone Album Guide | 4.5/5 stars |

Greatest Hits is a compilation album by Tom Petty and the Heartbreakers, released on November 16, 1993. It is Petty's best-selling album to date and was certified 12× Platinum by the RIAA on April 28, 2015. The single "Mary Jane's Last Dance", one of two previously unreleased tracks on the album, became one of Petty's most popular songs, reaching No. 14 on the Billboard Hot 100 and No. 1 on the Billboard Mainstream Rock Tracks chart. The other new song on the album is a cover of the Thunderclap Newman hit "Something in the Air", which reached No. 19 on the Billboard Mainstream Rock Tracks chart. The album contains no songs from 1987's Let Me Up (I've Had Enough). However, three songs from Petty's 1989 solo album Full Moon Fever, along with four tracks from 1979's Damn the Torpedoes were included.

On its original release in November 1993, the album debuted at No. 8 on Billboard 200, and first peaked at No. 5 on the chart in February 1994. It reached a new peak of No. 2 following Petty's death in 2017.

The new tracks "Mary Jane's Last Dance" and "Something in the Air" were the band's last recordings with drummer Stan Lynch.

== Reissues ==
In 2008, Greatest Hits was reissued by Geffen Records. This edition replaced "Something in the Air" with "Stop Draggin' My Heart Around", Petty's duet with Stevie Nicks from her 1981 album Bella Donna. The album's photos and artwork replaced the Wildflowers and Into the Great Wide Open session photos with outtakes from You're Gonna Get It!. In 2010 the album was once again reissued, this time reverting to the original 1993 track listing but keeping the artwork from the 2008 edition. In 2016 the album was made available on vinyl for the first time since 1993.

== Track listing ==
1993 original & 2010 reissue track listing
| No. | Title | Writer(s) | Original album/notes | Length |
|---|---|---|---|---|
| 1. | "American Girl" | Tom Petty | Tom Petty and the Heartbreakers (1976) | 3:33 |
| 2. | "Breakdown" | Petty | Tom Petty and the Heartbreakers | 2:44 |
| 3. | "Listen to Her Heart" | Petty | You're Gonna Get It!, 1978 | 3:03 |
| 4. | "I Need to Know" | Petty | You're Gonna Get It! | 2:24 |
| 5. | "Refugee" | Petty; Mike Campbell | Damn the Torpedoes (1979) | 3:21 |
| 6. | "Don't Do Me Like That" | Petty | Damn the Torpedoes | 2:42 |
| 7. | "Even the Losers" | Petty | Damn the Torpedoes | 3:38 |
| 8. | "Here Comes My Girl" | Petty; Campbell | Damn the Torpedoes | 4:25 |
| 9. | "The Waiting" | Petty | Hard Promises (1981) | 4:00 |
| 10. | "You Got Lucky" | Petty; Campbell | Long After Dark, 1982 | 3:36 |
| 11. | "Don't Come Around Here No More" | Petty; David A. Stewart | Southern Accents (1985) | 5:04 |
| 12. | "I Won't Back Down" | Petty; Jeff Lynne | Full Moon Fever (1989) | 2:57 |
| 13. | "Runnin' Down a Dream" | Petty; Lynne; Campbell | Full Moon Fever | 4:23 |
| 14. | "Free Fallin'" | Petty; Lynne | Full Moon Fever | 4:15 |
| 15. | "Learning to Fly" | Petty; Lynne | Into the Great Wide Open (1991) | 4:01 |
| 16. | "Into the Great Wide Open" | Petty; Lynne | Into the Great Wide Open | 3:44 |
| 17. | "Mary Jane's Last Dance" | Petty | New song | 4:33 |
| 18. | "Something in the Air" | Speedy Keen | Thunderclap Newman cover | 3:21 |
| Total length: | | | | 65:44 |

1993 UK edition bonus track
| No. | Title | Writer(s) | Original album/notes | Length |
|---|---|---|---|---|
| 3. | "Anything That's Rock 'n' Roll" | Petty | Tom Petty and the Heartbreakers | 2:24 |
| Total length: | | | | 68:10 |

2008 reissue alternate track
| No. | Title | Writer(s) | Original album/notes | Length |
|---|---|---|---|---|
| 18. | "Stop Draggin' My Heart Around" | Petty; Campbell | Stevie Nicks' Bella Donna (1981) | 4:03 |
| Total length: | | | | 66:26 |

== Personnel ==
Tom Petty & The Heartbreakers

- Tom Petty – vocals, guitar, piano, harmonica, percussion (all tracks)
- Mike Campbell – lead guitar, bass guitar, keyboards, squeeze box (all tracks)
- Benmont Tench – keyboards, piano, backing vocals (tracks 1–11, 15–18)
- Ron Blair – bass guitar (tracks 1–8)
- Howie Epstein – bass guitar, backing vocals (tracks 10–12, 15–18)
- Stan Lynch – drums, percussion, backing vocals (tracks 1–11, 15–18)

Additional musicians

- George Harrison – acoustic guitar, backing vocals (track 12)
- Jeff Lynne – bass guitar, guitar, guitar synthesizer, piano, keyboards, backing vocals (tracks 12–16)
- David A. Stewart – sitar, keyboards, backing vocals (track 11)

Uncredited musicians

- Donald "Duck" Dunn – bass guitar (track 18, 2008 release)
- Dean Garcia – intro bass guitar (track 11)
- Phil Jones – percussion, drums (tracks 9–10, 12–14)
- Jeff Jourard, Mike Slee – guitar (track 2)
- Jim Keltner – percussion (track 5)
- Stevie Nicks – co-lead vocals (track 18, 2008 release)
- Lori Perry, Sharon Celani – backing vocals (track 18, 2008 release)
- Daniel Rothmuller – cello (track 11)
- Phil Seymour – backing vocals (tracks 1–2)
- Chris Trujillo – percussion (tracks 17–18)
- Alan "Bugs" Weidel – "wild dog" piano (track 11)
- Sharon Celani, Marilyn Martin, Stephanie Sprull – backing vocals (track 11)

== Charts ==
=== Weekly charts ===
1993 weekly chart performance for Greatest Hits
| Chart (1993) | Peak position |
|---|---|
| Dutch Albums (Album Top 100) | 18 |
| German Albums (Offizielle Top 100) | 18 |
| Norwegian Albums (VG-lista) | 9 |
| Swedish Albums (Sverigetopplistan) | 9 |
| Swiss Albums (Schweizer Hitparade) | 23 |
| UK Albums (Official Charts) | 10 |

1994 weekly chart performance for Greatest Hits
| Chart (1994) | Peak position |
|---|---|
| Australian Albums (ARIA) | 16 |
| Austrian Albums (Ö3 Austria) | 22 |
| Canadian Top Albums | 4 |
| New Zealand Albums (RMNZ) | 2 |
| US Billboard 200 | 5 |

2017 weekly chart performance for Greatest Hits
| Chart (2017) | Peak position |
|---|---|
| Australian Albums (ARIA) | 9 |
| Canadian Albums (Billboard) | 5 |
| UK Albums (OCC) | 14 |
| US Billboard 200 | 2 |
| US Top Rock Albums (Billboard) | 1 |

2023 weekly chart performance for Greatest Hits
| Chart (2023) | Peak position |
|---|---|
| Greek Albums (IFPI) | 1 |

=== Year-end charts ===
1994 annual chart performance for Greatest Hits
| Chart (1994) | Position |
|---|---|
| Canada Top Albums/CDs (RPM) | 22 |
| German Albums (Offizielle Top 100) | 91 |
| New Zealand Albums (RMNZ) | 43 |
| US Billboard 200 | 14 |

1995 annual chart performance for Greatest Hits
| Chart (1995) | Position |
|---|---|
| US Billboard 200 | 93 |

1996 annual chart performance for Greatest Hits
| Chart (1996) | Position |
|---|---|
| US Billboard 200 | 167 |

2017 annual chart performance for Greatest Hits
| Chart (2017) | Position |
|---|---|
| US Billboard 200 | 116 |
| US Top Rock Albums (Billboard) | 10 |

2018 annual chart performance for Greatest Hits
| Chart (2018) | Position |
|---|---|
| US Billboard 200 | 74 |
| US Top Rock Albums (Billboard) | 5 |

2019 annual chart performance for Greatest Hits
| Chart (2019) | Position |
|---|---|
| US Billboard 200 | 148 |
| US Top Rock Albums (Billboard) | 25 |

2020 annual chart performance for Greatest Hits
| Chart (2020) | Position |
|---|---|
| US Billboard 200 | 81 |
| US Top Rock Albums (Billboard) | 8 |

2021 annual chart performance for Greatest Hits
| Chart (2021) | Position |
|---|---|
| US Billboard 200 | 76 |
| US Top Rock Albums (Billboard) | 8 |

2022 annual chart performance for Greatest Hits
| Chart (2022) | Position |
|---|---|
| US Billboard 200 | 78 |
| US Top Rock Albums (Billboard) | 8 |

2023 annual chart performance for Greatest Hits
| Chart (2023) | Position |
|---|---|
| US Billboard 200 | 79 |
| US Top Rock Albums (Billboard) | 10 |

2024 annual chart performance for Greatest Hits
| Chart (2024) | Position |
|---|---|
| US Billboard 200 | 94 |

== Certifications ==
Certifications for Greatest Hits
| Region | Certification | Certified units/sales |
|---|---|---|
| Australia (ARIA) | Gold | 35,000^{^} |
| Germany (BVMI) | Gold | 250,000^{^} |
| New Zealand (RMNZ) | 4× Platinum | 60,000^{‡} |
| Norway (IFPI Norway) | Gold | 25,000^{‡} |
| Sweden (GLF) | Gold | 50,000^{^} |
| United Kingdom (BPI) | Platinum | 300,000^{^} |
| United States (RIAA) | 12× Platinum | 12,000,000^{^} |
^{^} Shipments figures based on certification alone.^{‡} Sales+streaming figures based on certification alone.

== Release history ==
Release formats for Greatest Hits
| Region | Date | Label | Format | Catalog |
|---|---|---|---|---|
| Europe | October 30, 1993 | MCA Records | double LP | MCA 10964 |
| Europe | October 30, 1993 | MCA Records | Cassette | MCC 10964 |
| Europe | October 30, 1993 | MCA Records | CD | MCD 10964 |
| North America | November 16, 1993 | MCA Records | Cassette | MCAC 10813 |
| North America | November 16, 1993 | MCA Records | CD | MCAD 10813 |
| North America | May 20, 2008 | Geffen Records | CD | B0010327-02 |
| Europe | May 20, 2008 | Geffen Records | CD | 1774395 |

== See also ==
- List of best-selling albums in the United States
