= Don't Do Me Like That =

- U.S. 7" vinyl

Single by Tom Petty and the Heartbreakers

from the album Damn the Torpedoes
- B-side: "Casa Dega" (US); "Century City" (UK)
- Released: November 5, 1979
- Genre: Heartland rock; boogie rock; R&B
- Length: 2:44
- Label: Backstreet
- Songwriter: Tom Petty
- Producer: Jimmy Iovine

Tom Petty and the Heartbreakers singles chronology
| "Listen to Her Heart" (1978) | "Don't Do Me Like That" (1979) | "Refugee" (1980) |

"Don't Do Me Like That" is a song by American rock band Tom Petty and the Heartbreakers, released on November 5, 1979 as the lead single from their third studio album, Damn the Torpedoes. The single is one of the band's most popular in North America, and is the Heartbreakers' only solo song to reach the top 10 of the Billboard Hot 100 (they later peaked at #3 when featured on the Stevie Nicks track "Stop Draggin' My Heart Around"). It was even more popular in Canada, peaking at No. 3, but in the UK, despite airplay by Capital Radio in the summer of 1980, the track failed to make the Top 75 chart.

== Background ==
Petty wrote the song and recorded a demo version with his previous band Mudcrutch in 1974. At one point, he strongly considered giving the song to The J. Geils Band because he thought it fit their sound. During the Damn the Torpedoes sessions, he was convinced by producer Jimmy Iovine to include it on the album because he sensed it would be a hit.

== Reception ==
Billboard praised the song for its "strong lyrical hook backed up by some solid mid to fast rock instrumentation" and its "urgent" vocal. Cash Box said that it "bounces along to a rock steady, engaging beat, bopping hook, staccato guitar chords with lively production". Record World called the hook "irresistible".

The Fort Worth Star Telegram rated it to be the 4th best single of 1979.

== Single track listings ==
- "Don't Do Me Like That" b/w "Casa Dega"
  Backstreet 41138 (US)
- "Don't Do Me Like That" b/w "Century City"
  "Something Else" (Live) b/w "Stories We Could Tell" (Live)
  Backstreet MCA 596 (UK 2x7" single)

== Chart performance ==
=== Weekly charts ===
| Chart (1979–1980) | Peak position |
|---|---|
| Canadian RPM Top Singles | 3 |
| New Zealand | 17 |
| U.S. Billboard Hot 100 | 10 |
| U.S. Cash Box Top 100 | 7 |

=== Year-end charts ===
| Chart (1980) | Rank |
|---|---|
| Canada | 37 |
| U.S. Billboard Hot 100 | 64 |
| U.S. Cash Box | 56 |

== Certification ==
| Region | Certification | Certified units/sales |
|---|---|---|
| New Zealand (RMNZ) | Gold | 15,000^{‡} |
^{‡} Sales+streaming figures based on certification alone.
