= You're Gonna Get It! =

Studio album by Tom Petty and the Heartbreakers
- Released: May 2, 1978
- Recorded: 1977–78
- Studio: Shelter (Hollywood)
- Genres: Pop; rock and roll
- Length: 29:38
- Label: Shelter
- Producers: Denny Cordell; Noah Shark; Tom Petty

Tom Petty and the Heartbreakers chronology
Tom Petty and the Heartbreakers (1976)	You're Gonna Get It! (1978)	Damn the Torpedoes (1979)

Singles from You're Gonna Get It!
- 1. "I Need to Know"/"No Second Thoughts" Released: 1978; 2. "Listen to Her Heart" Released: August 30, 1978

You're Gonna Get It! is the second studio album by the American rock band Tom Petty and the Heartbreakers, released on May 2, 1978, by Shelter Records. Originally, the album was to be titled Terminal Romance. Its design and art direction was handled by Josh Kosh. The album peaked at No. 23 on the Billboard Top LPs & Tape chart in its release year, a higher position than its predecessor, Tom Petty and the Heartbreakers (1976).

== Critical reception ==
Professional ratings
Review scores
Source	Rating
AllMusic	3.5/5 stars
Blender	2/5 stars
Chicago Tribune	3/4 stars
The Daily Vault	A−
The Encyclopedia of Popular Music	4/5 stars
The Essential Rock Discography	7/10
MusicHound Rock	4/5 stars
Christgau's Record Guide	B
The Rolling Stone Album Guide	2.5/5 stars
The Village Voice	B

Many reviewers rated You're Gonna Get It! a notch lower than the band's moderately well-received debut album. Rolling Stone noted the "impressive stylistic cohesiveness" between the two. The Globe and Mail wrote that Petty "is a pop stylist and makes no bones about rephrasing the musical and lyrical themes which constituted pop (as opposed to rock, rhythm and blues or any of the other) before it got lost in the mires of country-rock and disco."

== Track listing ==
All tracks are written by Tom Petty, except 3 and 10, co-written with Mike Campbell.

Side one
No.	Title	Length
1.	"When the Time Comes"	2:47
2.	"You're Gonna Get It"	3:01
3.	"Hurt"	3:16
4.	"Magnolia"	3:03
5.	"Too Much Ain't Enough"	2:56

Side two
No.	Title	Length
6.	"I Need to Know"	2:24
7.	"Listen to Her Heart"	3:04
8.	"No Second Thoughts"	2:41
9.	"Restless"	3:24
10.	"Baby's a Rock 'n' Roller"	2:53

== Personnel ==
Tom Petty & the Heartbreakers

- Tom Petty – electric guitar, acoustic guitar, twelve-string guitar, rhythm guitar, piano, vocals
- Mike Campbell – electric guitar, acoustic guitar, twelve string guitar, lead guitar, accordion
- Benmont Tench – piano, Hammond organ, backing vocals
- Ron Blair – bass guitar, acoustic guitar, sound effects
- Stan Lynch – drums, backing vocals

Additional musicians

- Phil Seymour – backing vocals on "Magnolia"
- Noah Shark – percussion

Production

- Denny Cordell – producer
- Tom Petty – producer
- Max Reese – engineer
- Noah Shark – producer, engineer

== Charts ==
Chart performance for You're Gonna Get It!
Chart (1978)	Peak Position
Australia (Kent Music Report)	60
Canada Top Albums/CDs (RPM)	38
New Zealand Albums (RMNZ)	33
UK Albums (Official Charts)	34
US Billboard 200	23

== Certifications ==
Certifications for You're Gonna Get It!
Region	Certification	Certified units/sales
United States (RIAA)	Gold	500,000^{^}
^{^} Shipments figures based on certification alone.
