= Tom Petty and the Heartbreakers =

American rock band (1976–2017)

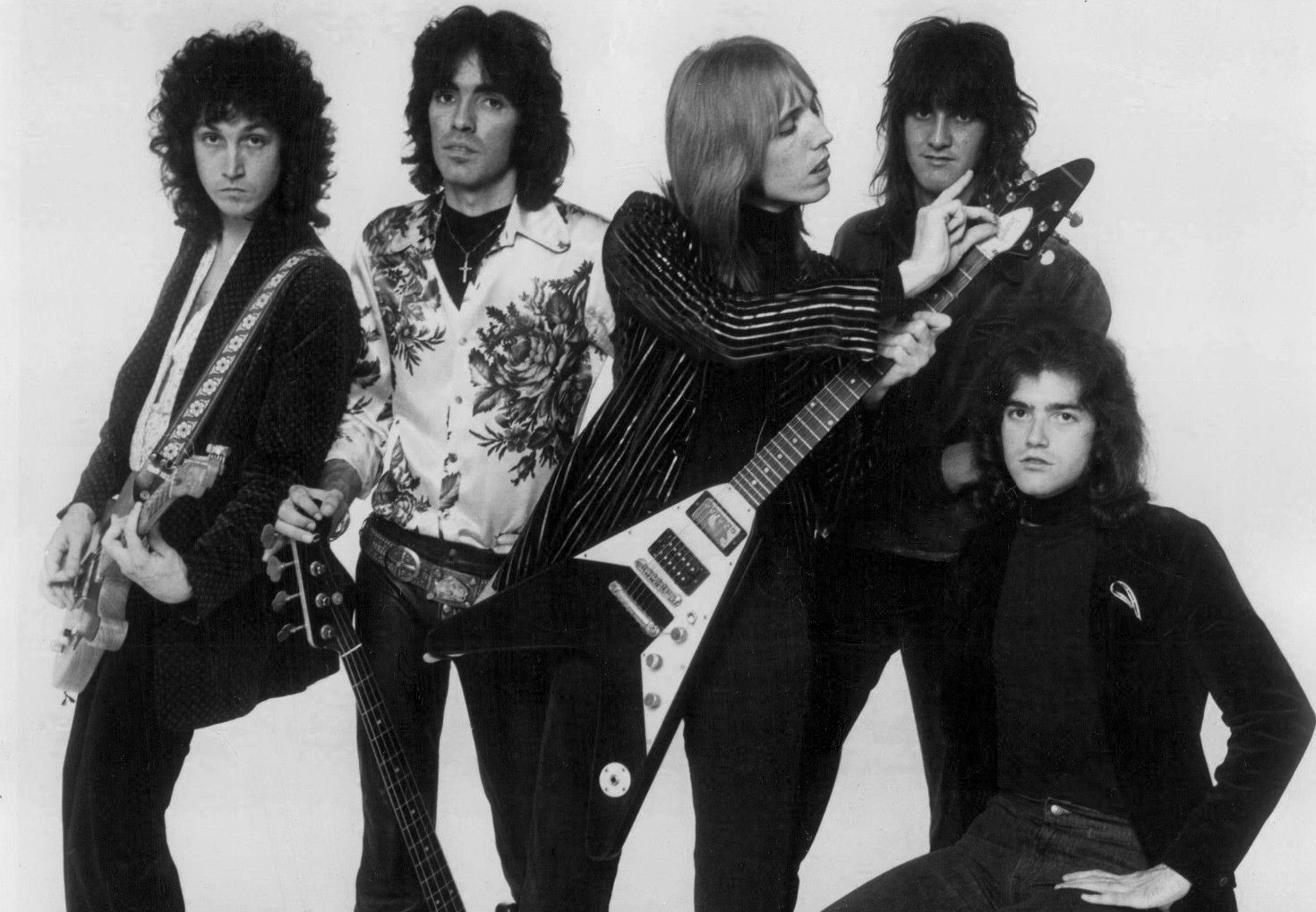
- The Heartbreakers in 1977. From left: Mike Campbell, Ron Blair, Tom Petty, Stan Lynch, and Benmont Tench

Background information
- Origin: Gainesville, Florida, U.S.
- Genres: Rock; heartland rock; Southern rock
- Works: Discography
- Years active: 1976–2017
- Labels: Shelter; Backstreet; MCA; Warner Bros.
- Spinoffs: Traveling Wilburys
- Spinoff of: Mudcrutch
- Past members: Tom Petty; Mike Campbell; Benmont Tench; Ron Blair; Stan Lynch; Howie Epstein; Scott Thurston; Steve Ferrone
- Website: tompetty.com

Tom Petty and the Heartbreakers were an American rock band formed in Gainesville, Florida, in 1976. The band originally comprised lead singer and rhythm guitarist Tom Petty, lead guitarist Mike Campbell, keyboardist Benmont Tench, drummer Stan Lynch and bassist Ron Blair. In 1982, Blair, weary of the touring lifestyle, departed the band. His replacement, Howie Epstein, remained with the band for the next two decades. In 1991, Scott Thurston joined the band as a multi-instrumentalist, primarily on rhythm guitar and secondary keyboard. In 1994, Steve Ferrone replaced Lynch on drums. Blair returned to the Heartbreakers in 2002, the year before Epstein's death. The band had a long string of hit singles, including "Breakdown", "American Girl" (both 1976), "Refugee" (1979), "The Waiting" (1981), "Learning to Fly" (1991), and "Mary Jane's Last Dance" (1993), among many others, that stretched over several decades of work.

Although Petty was insistent that the band's musical style be referred to as simply rock and roll, the Heartbreakers' music was characterized as both Southern rock and heartland rock, cited alongside artists such as Bruce Springsteen, Bob Seger, and John Mellencamp as progenitors of the latter genre, which arose in the late 1970s and early 1980s. While the heartland rock movement waned in the 1990s, the band remained active and popular, touring regularly until Petty's death in 2017, after which the Heartbreakers disbanded. Their final studio album, Hypnotic Eye, was released in 2014.

The band was inducted into the Rock and Roll Hall of Fame in 2002, their first year of eligibility. Although most of their material was produced and performed under the name "Tom Petty and the Heartbreakers", Petty released three solo albums, the most successful of which was Full Moon Fever (1989). In these releases, some members of the band contributed as collaborators, producing and performing as studio musicians.

== History ==
=== Early years and first two albums (1974–1978) ===
As a teenager, Tom Petty joined or formed several bands in his hometown of Gainesville, Florida, included the Sundowners and the Epics, with Petty playing guitar and bass and singing as needed. In 1970, he and fellow North Central Florida resident Mike Campbell (lead guitar) formed Mudcrutch, with Benmont Tench (keyboards) joining in 1972. The band was a local success, eventually playing gigs across Florida, enjoying regular residences at popular clubs, and organizing music festivals at "Mudcrutch Farm", a large empty lot adjacent to the small house where most band members lived. In 1974, Mudcrutch relocated to Los Angeles, California in attempt to gain the attention of a major record label. Leon Russell signed them to Shelter Records, but their 1975 debut single "Depot Street" failed to chart, and after failing to record another single to their label's satisfaction, Mudcrutch disbanded.

Though Mudcrutch had dissolved, Petty remained attached to Shelter Records as a songwriter and solo artist, and in 1976, he reunited with Mike Campbell and Benmont Tench to form "Tom Petty and the Heartbreakers" along with fellow Gainesville expatriates Stan Lynch on drums and Ron Blair on bass. The Heartbreakers began their recording career with a self-titled album. Initially, the Heartbreakers did not gain much traction in the U.S., although they achieved early success in the UK after playing "Anything That's Rock 'n' Roll" on Top of the Pops. While subsequent singles "Breakdown" and "American Girl" failed to sell in the US, the band continued to gain attention in the UK. Recalling the band's brief British tour in 1976, Petty stated, "The audience just jumped up and charged the stage and were boogieing their brains out. It was such a rush. Wow, we had never seen anything like that, man." "Breakdown" was re-released in the U.S. and became a Top 40 hit in 1978, after word filtered back of the band's massive success in Britain, and perhaps more importantly after it featured on the extremely popular soundtrack to the 1978 film, FM. "American Girl" was covered in 1977 by Roger McGuinn on his "Thunderbyrd" LP.

Tom Petty and the Heartbreakers' second album, You're Gonna Get It! (1978), was their first gold record, and featured the singles "I Need to Know" and "Listen To Her Heart". In 1979, the band was dragged into a legal dispute when ABC Records, Shelter's distributor, was sold to MCA Records. Petty refused to be transferred to another record label and held fast to his principles, which led to his filing for bankruptcy as a tactic against MCA.

=== Mainstream success (1979–1984) ===
In 1979, after their legal dispute was settled, the Heartbreakers released their third album, Damn the Torpedoes, through MCA's Backstreet label. The album rapidly went platinum. It included "Don't Do Me Like That" (#10 U.S., the group's first Top Ten single) and "Refugee" (#15 U.S.), their U.S. breakthrough singles.

Although he was already extremely successful, Petty again ran into record company trouble when he and the Heartbreakers prepared to release Hard Promises (1981), the follow-up album to Damn the Torpedoes. MCA wanted to release the record at the list price of $9.98. This so-called "superstar pricing" was a dollar more than the usual list price of $8.98. Petty voiced his objections to the price hike in the press, and the issue became a popular cause among music fans. Non-delivery of the album or naming it Eight Ninety-Eight were considered, but eventually MCA decided against the price increase. The album became a Top Ten hit, going platinum and spawning the hit single "The Waiting" (#19 U.S.). The album also included the duet "Insider", with Stevie Nicks.

On their fifth album, Long After Dark (1982), bass player Ron Blair was replaced by Howie Epstein (formerly of Del Shannon's backing band), giving the Heartbreakers their lineup until 1991. Long After Dark features the hits "You Got Lucky" (U.S. #20) and "Change of Heart" (U.S. #21), and was to feature a track called "Keeping Me Alive", but producer Jimmy Iovine vetoed it from the album. Petty had expressed that he felt the album would have been more successful if "Keeping Me Alive" had been included.

=== Southern Accents and Let Me Up (I've Had Enough) (1985–1988) ===
On the sixth album, Southern Accents (1985), the Heartbreakers picked up where they had left off. The recording was not without problems; Petty became frustrated during the mixing process and broke his left hand when punching a wall. The album included the psychedelic-sounding hit single "Don't Come Around Here No More" (#13 U.S.), which was produced by and co-written with Dave Stewart. The video for the single, which starred Stewart, featured Petty dressed as the Mad Hatter, mocking and chasing Alice from the book Alice's Adventures in Wonderland, then cutting and eating her as if she were a cake. This caused minor controversy after it was criticized by feminist groups, but the video did win an MTV Video Music Award.

A successful concert tour led to the live album Pack Up the Plantation: Live! (1985). The band's live capabilities were also showcased when Bob Dylan invited the Heartbreakers to join him on his True Confessions Tour through Australia, Japan and the U.S. (1986) and Europe (1987). Petty praised Dylan, saying, "I don't think there is anyone we admire more."

Also in 1987, the group released Let Me Up (I've Had Enough), a studio album made to sound like a live recording, using a technique they borrowed from Dylan. It includes "Jammin' Me" (#18 U.S.), which Petty wrote with Dylan and Campbell. Dylan recorded a version of the Petty composition "Got My Mind Made Up" on his album Knocked Out Loaded, which was credited as being written by Dylan and Petty.

=== Comeback and return to popularity (1989–2005) ===
In 1989, Petty released his debut solo album Full Moon Fever, which included five singles ("I Won't Back Down", "Runnin' Down a Dream", "Free Fallin'", "A Face in the Crowd" and "Yer So Bad"), and was accompanied by a tour with the Replacements. Two years later, the Heartbreakers released Into the Great Wide Open, produced by Jeff Lynne, who had worked with Petty in the Traveling Wilburys. Songs included the title track itself and "Learning to Fly". Multi-instrumentalist Scott Thurston joined the band as of the tour for the album.

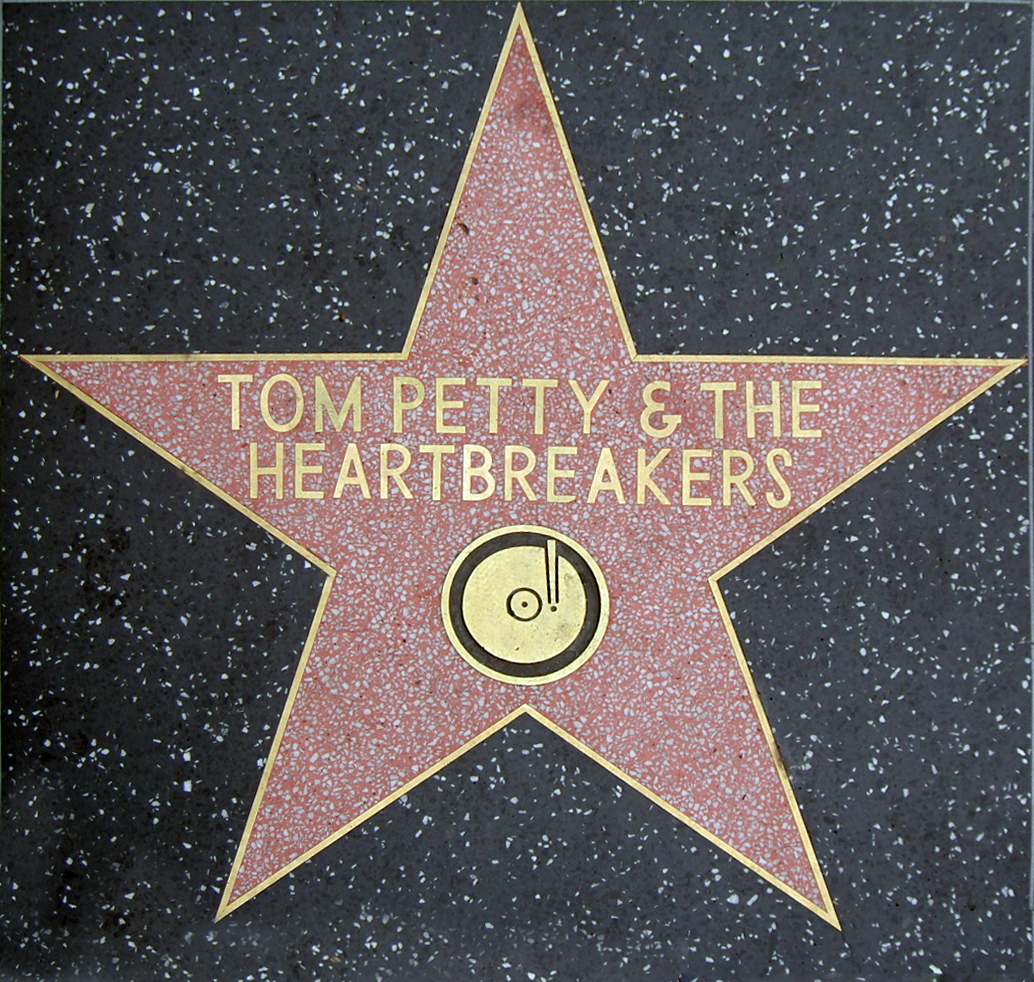
Hollywood walk of fame star, awarded in 1999

In 1993, Petty released Greatest Hits, which included the hit single "Mary Jane's Last Dance". Stan Lynch had moved to Florida, but was persuaded to return for his last session with the band.

In 1994, Lynch left the band. Drummer Dave Grohl, formerly of the band Nirvana, sat in on a number of performances, but declined to join the band, instead choosing to pursue his own solo work which eventually grew into the band Foo Fighters. The band was now and for the next several years officially a quartet with no permanent drummer, but beginning in 1995 for live shows Steve Ferrone, formerly a session and touring musician who had played with numerous other acts, served as drummer. He had worked with Petty, Campbell, Tench, and Epstein on Petty's solo album Wildflowers.

In 1995, a six-CD box-set titled Playback was released. Approximately half of the tracks were previously available on albums, and the rest were B-sides, demos and live tracks. Two notable tracks are a "solo" version of Petty's 1981 duet with Stevie Nicks, "Stop Draggin' My Heart Around", and the song "Waiting for Tonight", which features vocals by the Bangles. The latter song also appeared on the two-CD anthology released in 2000, Anthology: Through the Years.

In 1996, Petty reunited with the Heartbreakers and released a soundtrack to the film She's the One starring Cameron Diaz and Jennifer Aniston, titled Songs and Music from "She's the One". Three songs charted from the album: "Walls (Circus)" (featuring Lindsey Buckingham), "Climb that Hill", and a song written by Lucinda Williams, "Changed the Locks". The album also included a cover version of Beck's song "Asshole". Curt Bisquera, not an official member of the group, was the drummer on most of the album, with Ringo Starr substituting on one track and Ferrone playing on two others.

In 1999, Petty and the Heartbreakers released the album Echo, produced by Rick Rubin. The album reached number 10 in the U.S. album charts and featured, among other singles, "Room at the Top". The band was still officially a four-piece (Petty, Campbell, Tench and Epstein), augmented by Ferrone on drums and Scott Thurston on various guitars, lap steel and ukulele. Both Ferrone and Thurston were promoted to full band membership after the album was released, and would remain Heartbreakers for the rest of the band's existence.

On April 28, 1999, Tom Petty and the Heartbreakers received a star on the Hollywood Walk of Fame, located at 7018 Hollywood Boulevard, for their contributions to the recording industry.

In 2002, the group released The Last DJ. Many of the tracks' lyrics contain stinging attacks on the music industry and major record companies. The album reached number 9 in the U.S. charts. Bassist Ron Blair played on two of the tracks. He replaced Epstein, who had previously been Blair's replacement, on the band's 2002 tour as a result of Epstein's deepening personal problems and drug abuse. Epstein died in 2003 at the age of 47.

=== Final years (2006–2017) ===
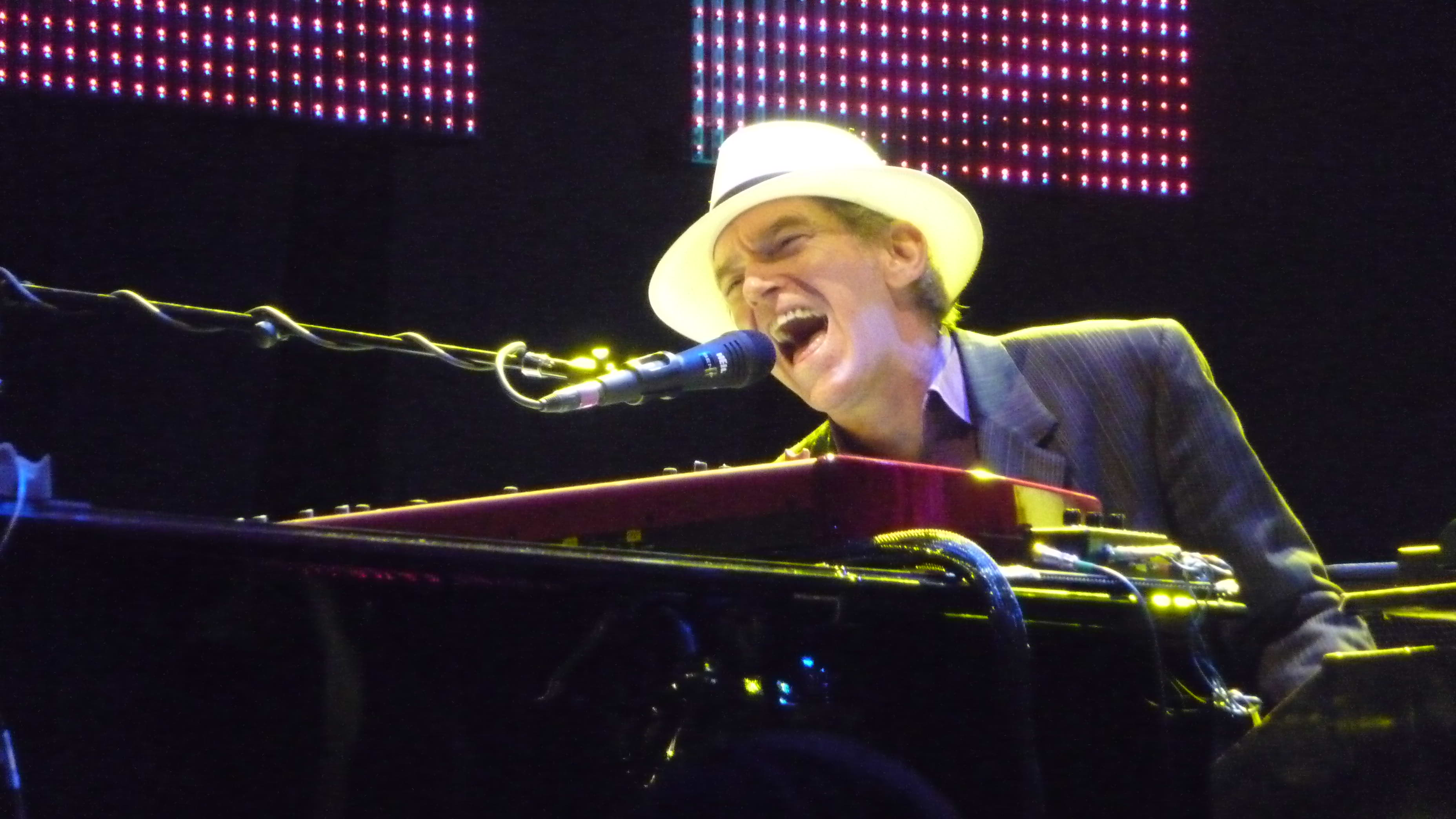
Keyboardist Benmont Tench performs with the band at the Hollywood Bowl in 2010.

In the band's thirtieth anniversary year, 2006, they headlined the fifth annual Bonnaroo Music and Arts Festival. In addition to Bonnaroo, Petty was on tour throughout the summer of 2006. The tour started in Charlotte, North Carolina, on June 9 and ended in Randall's Island, New York on August 19. Stops included major cities such as New York, St. Louis, Indianapolis, and Denver. Supporting acts during the tour included Pearl Jam, the Allman Brothers Band, and Trey Anastasio. Additionally, Stevie Nicks joined the band onstage during the first eight concerts as well as subsequent second-leg dates to perform various songs from the Heartbreakers' catalog. For the Highway Companion Tour, they offered a Highway Companion's Club which allowed fans to receive priority seating, discounts at the Tom Petty Store, a complimentary CD of Highway Companion and a personalized email address.

In 2006, the ABC U.S. television network hired Petty to do the music for its NBA Playoffs coverage.

On September 21, 2006, Tom Petty and the Heartbreakers received the keys to the city of Gainesville, Florida, where he and his bandmates either lived or grew up. Petty quipped, when questioned about the key he received from Gainesville's mayor, "It's a lot nicer than the one we got in Chicago."

From July 2006 until 2007, the Rock and Roll Hall of Fame in Cleveland, Ohio featured an exhibit of Tom Petty items. Much of the content was donated by Petty himself from a visit to his home by some of the Rock Hall curatorial staff.

In 2007, the band accepted an invitation to participate in a tribute album to Fats Domino, contributing their version of "I'm Walkin'" to Goin' Home: A Tribute to Fats Domino (Vanguard).

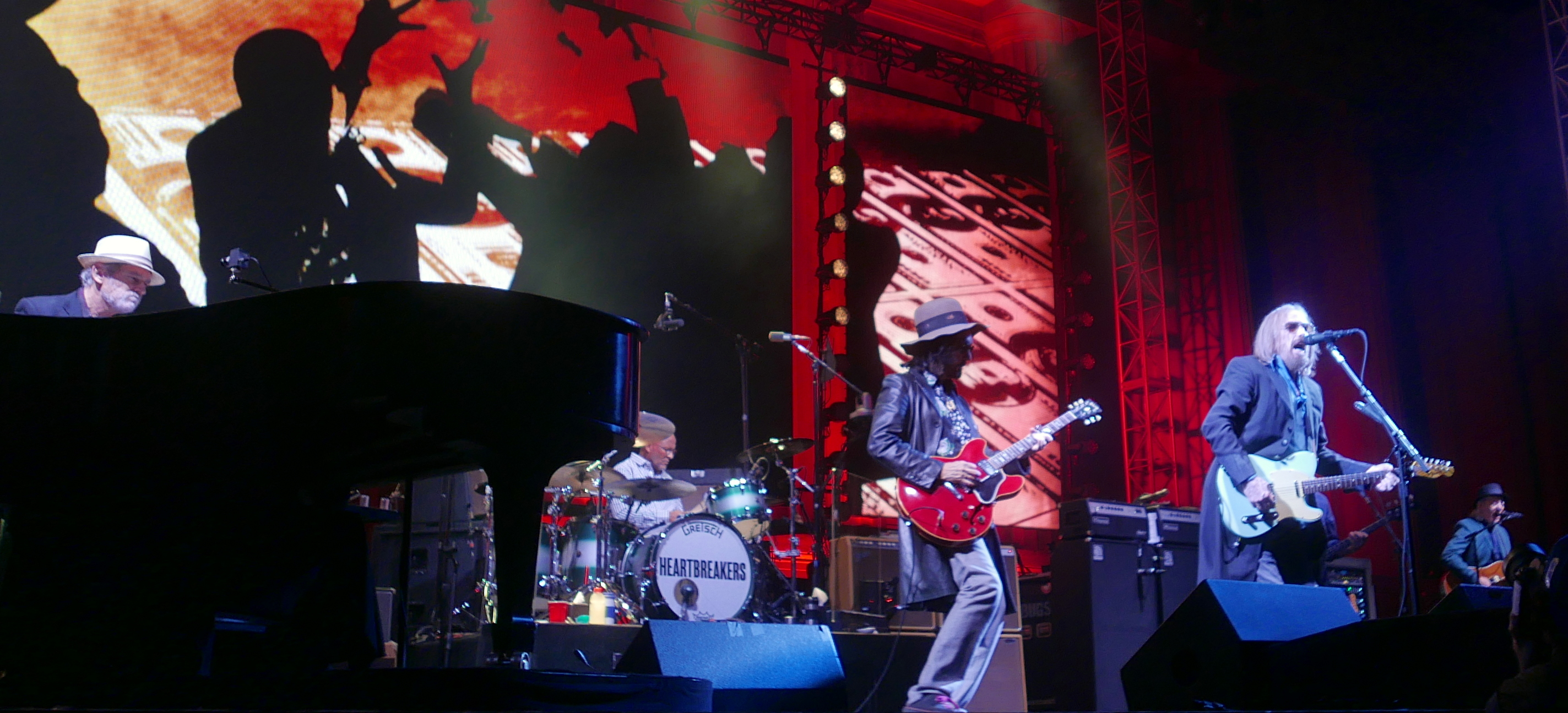
The Heartbreakers in August 2017, less than two months before Petty's death

In 2008, the Heartbreakers were also featured as the Super Bowl XLII halftime show. In April that year, the members of Petty's previous band, Mudcrutch—Petty, Tench, and Campbell, along with Randall Marsh and Tom Leadon—released a Mudcrutch album. In late 2008, they released a live EP.

The band issued The Live Anthology, a collection of live recordings, on November 23, 2009, and announced a new studio album, Mojo, for release in the spring of 2010. The band released Hypnotic Eye on July 29, 2014, and archive recordings from their Playlist box set Nobody's Children and Through the Cracks digitally in 2015.

In 2017, the band embarked on a 40th Anniversary Tour of the United States. The tour began on April 20 in Oklahoma City and ended on September 25 with a performance at the Hollywood Bowl in Hollywood, California. The Hollywood Bowl concert, which became the Heartbreakers' final show, ended with a performance of "American Girl".

=== Petty's death and aftermath (2017–present) ===
Early in the morning on October 2, 2017, Petty was found unconscious in his home, not breathing, and in full cardiac arrest. Following premature media reports of his death, Petty died at the UCLA Medical Center in Santa Monica, California. He was 66.

Though the group did not formally disband, Petty stated in his final interview, with the Los Angeles Times a few days before his death, that the Heartbreakers would probably disband if one of its members died or became too ill to perform.

In April 2018, Campbell, Tench and Ferrone acted as the house band for the Light Up the Blues benefit concert in Los Angeles, backing Beck, Neil Young, Patti Smith, and Stephen Stills, with whom they performed Petty's "I Won't Back Down". That same month, it was announced that Campbell (along with Neil Finn) had joined Fleetwood Mac to replace lead guitarist Lindsey Buckingham.

In September 2023, Campbell, Tench and Ferrone backed Bob Dylan for a surprise performance at Farm Aid.

On September 16, 2026, the surviving original members of the band reunited to perform at the 2026 Americana Music Honors & Awards ceremony, where they were the recipients of the Lifetime Achievement Award, with Chris Stapleton joining them on vocals.They performed "American Girl", "Breakdown", and "You Wreck Me" to open the show, with Thurston and Ferrone joining them for the latter.

== Session work (1970s–2017) ==
During the course of the band, the various members did session work for other notable artists. In 1981, Petty and Campbell wrote the lyrics to "Stop Draggin' My Heart Around", which was intended as a Heartbreakers song. However, their producer Jimmy Iovine, who was also producing Stevie Nicks, suggested it be turned into a duet with her, and the band agreed, so the song ended up on her album Bella Donna. All the Heartbreakers except Ron Blair had performed on the track.

In the mid-1980s, former Eagle Don Henley teamed up with Campbell, Tench and Lynch for his 1984 album Building the Perfect Beast. Campbell wrote a demo version of the track "The Boys of Summer" and showed it to Petty, who both felt it did not fit Southern Accents, the album they were working on at the time. Iovine suggested recording it with Henley, with whom they re-recorded it after Henley changed the key. Henley collaborated with Campbell and Lynch for his 1989 album The End of the Innocence, with the two Heartbreakers producing it alongside the likes of Danny Kortchmar and Bruce Hornsby. Campbell again wrote one of the hits from the album, "The Heart of the Matter".

In 1986, Bob Dylan wrote and recorded the track "Band of the Hand" as the theme song for the Paul Michael Glaser film of the same title. On the recording, Dylan is backed by Tom Petty and the Heartbreakers, with a group of backing singers including Stevie Nicks, and the track is credited to "Bob Dylan and the Heartbreakers".

Lynch went on to produce Henley's 2000 album Inside Job and 2015 album Cass County. He also contributed to the Eagles' 1994 reunion album, Hell Freezes Over, playing percussion and having a hand in its production.

Lynch and Campbell played alongside Henley on Warren Zevon's 1987 album Sentimental Hygiene.

Campbell played slide guitar on "6th Avenue Heartache", released in 1996 by the Wallflowers. He recorded his guitar part without even meeting the band.

In the mid-1990s, members of the Heartbreakers teamed up to perform on Johnny Cash's American Recordings series of albums. The entire band played on Unchained, save for Lynch, who had left in 1994. For Volume III, only Campbell and Petty contributed, the latter performing a duet with Cash on a cover of "I Won't Back Down". Tench and Campbell then contributed to Volume IV, Volume V, and Volume VI. In March 2014, Cash's son had hinted that four or five more American albums may be released.

== Live performances ==
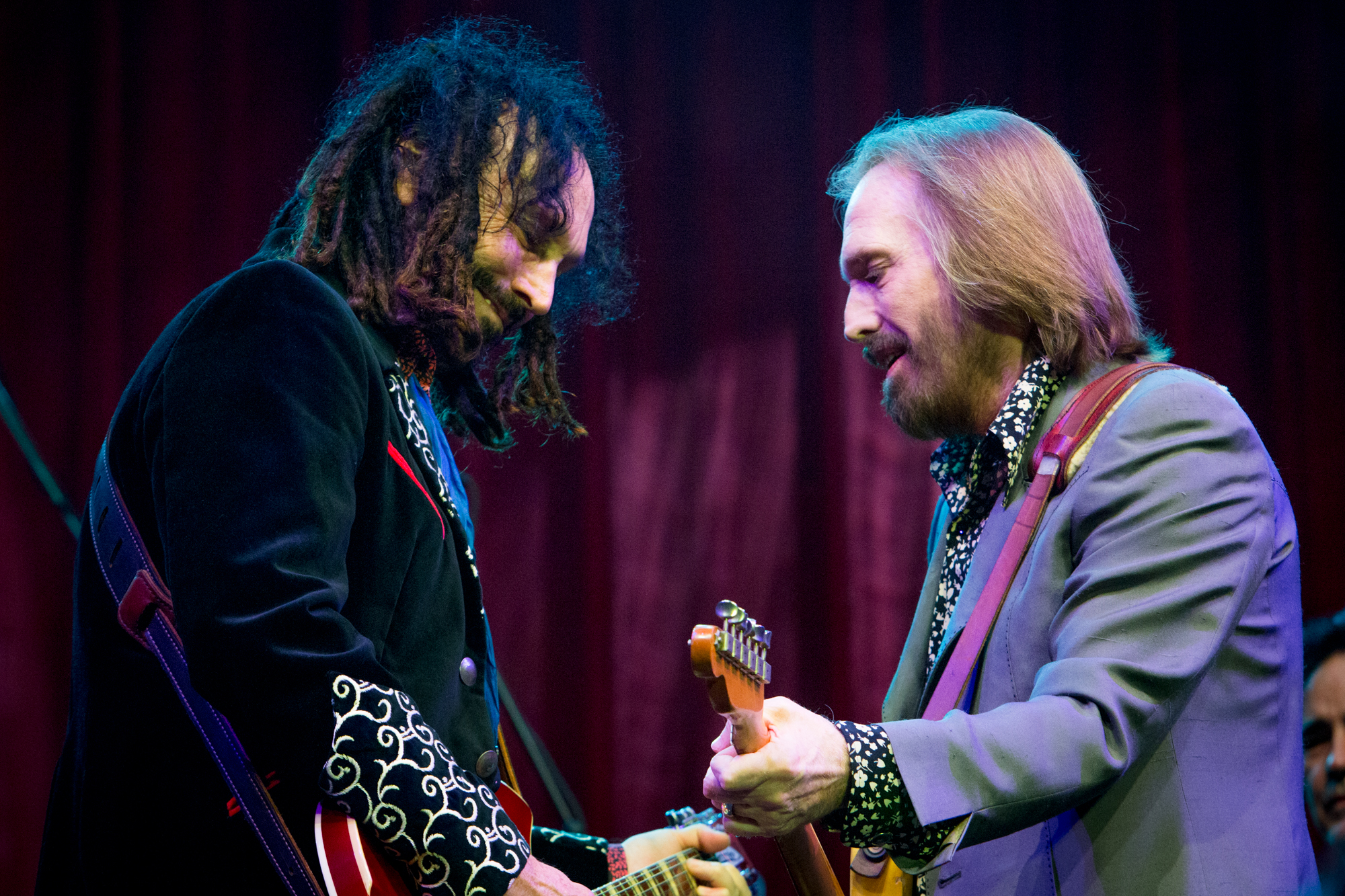
Mike Campbell (left) and Tom Petty at Bonnaroo in 2013

- In 1985, Tom Petty and the Heartbreakers participated in the international charity rock concert Live Aid.
- In 1986, Tom Petty and the Heartbreakers released a live record, Pack Up the Plantation: Live!, primarily recorded at the Wiltern Theatre during their 1985 tour, along with some songs from previous concerts.
- In 1992, the band played three songs (including one backing Roger McGuinn) at Madison Square Garden to honor the 30th anniversary of the release of Bob Dylan's first record. The three songs were released on The 30th Anniversary Concert Celebration.
- In 1994, they played on Saturday Night Live, featuring former Nirvana drummer Dave Grohl. Petty offered Grohl to join the Heartbreakers full-time after the show but Grohl declined as he was working on his new project, Foo Fighters. The two remained friends.
- They also played at the 2001 America: A Tribute to Heroes benefit concert.
- In 2002, the band played at the Concert for George, honoring Petty's Wilburys bandmate George Harrison, who had died the previous year.
- In 2006, the band returned to their hometown of Gainesville and celebrated their anniversary with a collection of popular songs.
- In 2008, the band performed the halftime show at Super Bowl XLII.
- In 2012, the band headlined Friday night at the Isle of Wight Festival.
- In 2017, the band headlined the final night of the British Summer Time festival in Hyde Park in London. They were supported by Stevie Nicks, who joined them on stage for a performance of "Stop Draggin' My Heart Around".
- In 2017, the band did the 40th Anniversary tour. They were supported by Joe Walsh, Peter Wolf, Chris Stapleton, The Lumineers and The Shelters among others. This was Tom Petty's last tour before his death.

== Petty's solo albums ==
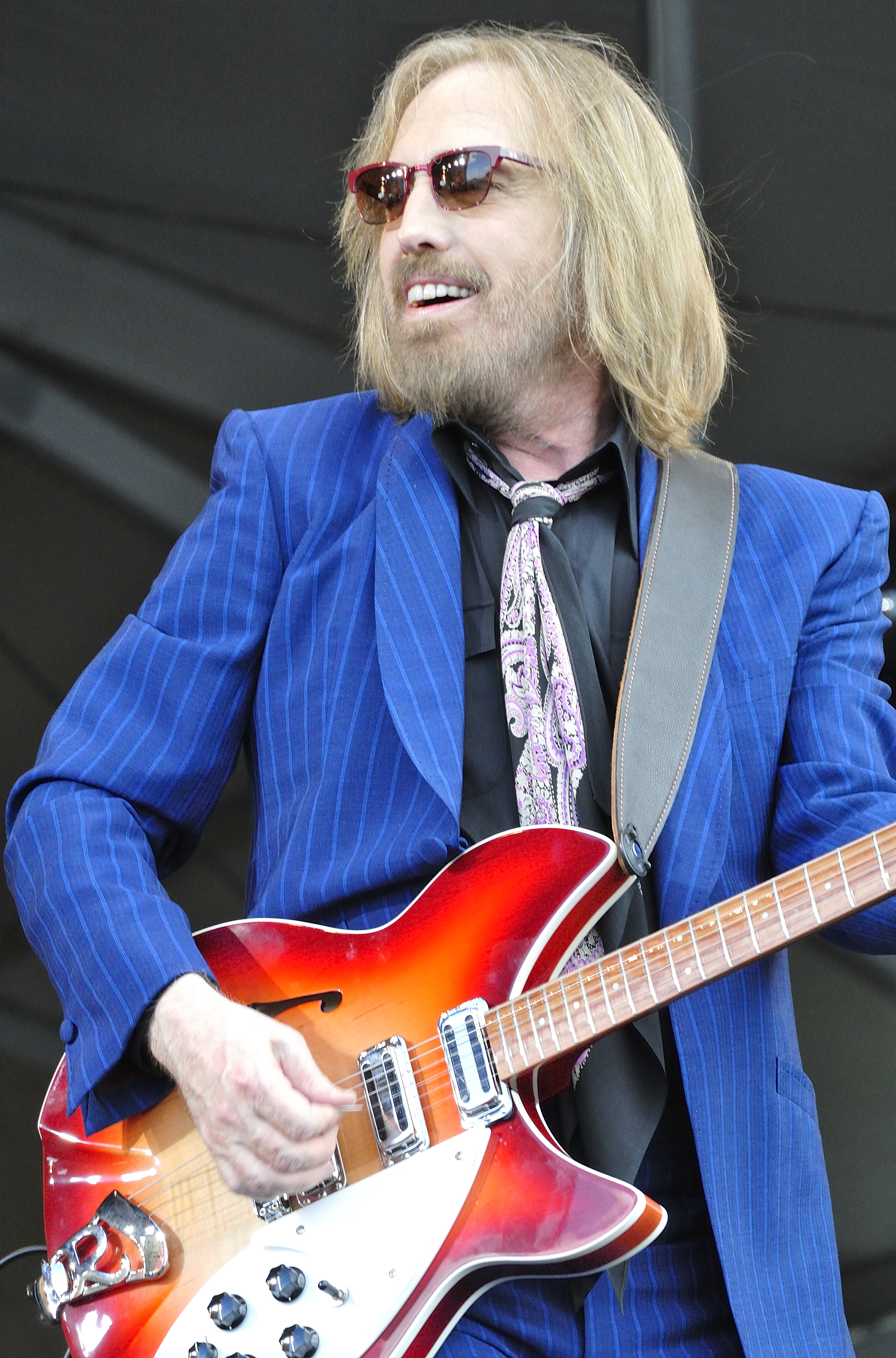
Tom Petty, the band's primary vocalist and songwriter. He also had a successful solo career and served as a member of the supergroup the Traveling Wilburys

Petty released three solo albums. The first was 1989's Full Moon Fever, which included his signature tune, "Free Fallin'", as well as "I Won't Back Down", later covered by Johnny Cash, "Runnin' Down a Dream" and Gene Clark's Byrds classic "I'll Feel a Whole Lot Better".

The Heartbreakers were dismayed by Petty's decision to go solo. Nevertheless, Campbell played guitar solos on every track, Tench contributed piano to one track, and Epstein provided backing vocals to two tracks.

Petty's second solo album, Wildflowers, included all Heartbreakers members except for Stan Lynch. The album, which featured Steve Ferrone on drums, produced the single "You Don't Know How It Feels".

Petty's final solo album was Highway Companion. As with Full Moon Fever, it was produced by Jeff Lynne. Campbell was the lead guitarist for the album, but no other Heartbreaker participated in the recording, as all instruments and vocals were performed by Petty, Campbell, and Lynne.

== Relationship with music industry ==
Petty fought against his record company on more than one occasion: first in 1979 over transference to another label, and then again in 1981 over the price of his record, which was (at that time) considered expensive. He was also outspoken on the current state of the music industry and modern radio stations, a topic that was a center concept of the lyrics of his 2002 album The Last DJ and its respective limited edition DVD.

In an interview with Billboard magazine, Petty described himself as "not really [being] involved in the business side of music".

== Members ==
- Tom Petty – lead vocals, rhythm and lead guitar, bass, harmonica, keyboards (1976–2017; his death)
- Mike Campbell – lead and rhythm guitar, bass, keyboards, mandolin, occasional backing and lead vocals (1976–2017)
- Benmont Tench – piano, organ, keyboards, backing vocals (1976–2017)
- Stan Lynch – drums, percussion, backing vocals (1976–1994)
- Ron Blair – bass guitar, backing vocals (1976–1982, 2002–2017; studio guest appearances from 1982–1985)
- Howie Epstein – bass guitar, rhythm guitar, mandolin, backing vocals (1982–2002; died 2003)
- Scott Thurston – rhythm and lead guitar, keyboards, harmonica, backing vocals (1999–2017; touring and session musician 1991–1999)
- Steve Ferrone – drums, percussion (1999–2017; touring and session musician 1994–1999)

== Discography ==
- Tom Petty and the Heartbreakers (1976)
- You're Gonna Get It! (1978)
- Damn the Torpedoes (1979)
- Hard Promises (1981)
- Long After Dark (1982)
- Southern Accents (1985)
- Let Me Up (I've Had Enough) (1987)
- Into the Great Wide Open (1991)
- Songs and Music from "She's the One" (1996)
- Echo (1999)
- The Last DJ (2002)
- Mojo (2010)
- Hypnotic Eye (2014)
- No Sleep Til L.A. (2026)

== See also ==
- Runnin' Down a Dream, a film documenting the history of the band
- List of awards and nominations received by Tom Petty
- Blue Stingrays, a band featuring Campbell, Tench, and Blair
