= Backstreet Records =

- Parent company: Universal Music Group
- Founded: 1979
- Founder: Danny Bramson
- Distributors: MCA Records (1979-2003); Geffen Records (2003-present)
- Country of origin: U.S.
- Location: Universal City, California

Backstreet Records was an MCA Records subsidiary label founded in 1979 by Danny Bramson, who was executive director of MCA's Universal Amphitheatre. The name was derived from the Bruce Springsteen song "Backstreets". The label's first releases were Robbie Patton's Do You Wanna Tonight and the self-titled debut album by Tears in August 1979. The first major signing to the label was Tom Petty, ending a legal battle between Petty and MCA over his recording contract which was acquired when MCA purchased ABC Records. The label's roster of artists also included J.J. Cale, Keith Sykes, Nils Lofgren, Men Without Hats, and Walter Egan. The label's last release was in 1983, after which it was absorbed into MCA Records.

Backstreet also released rock-oriented soundtrack albums to several films produced by its parent company Universal Studios, including Where the Buffalo Roam, Nighthawks, The Border, Cat People and Doctor Detroit.

== Partial discography ==
- 1979: Do You Wanna Tonight – Robbie Patton (MCA-3169)
- 1979: Tears – Tears (MCA-3172)
- 1979: Damn the Torpedoes – Tom Petty and the Heartbreakers (MCA-5105)
- 1980: Where The Buffalo Roam soundtrack (MCA-5126)
- 1981: Hard Promises – Tom Petty and the Heartbreakers (BSR-5160)
- 1981: Nighthawks – Keith Emerson: Nighthawks soundtrack (BSR-5196)
- 1981: Night Fades Away – Nils Lofgren (BSR-5251)
- 1981: It Don't Hurt To Flirt– Keith Sykes (BSR-5277)
- 1982: Counting the Beat – The Swingers (BSR-5328)
- 1982: Long After Dark – Tom Petty and the Heartbreakers (BSR-5360)
- 1982: The Border – Ry Cooder (BSR-6105)
- 1982: Cat People soundtrack – Giorgio Moroder (BSR-6107)
- 1983: Rhythm of Youth – Men Without Hats (BSR-5436)
- 1983: Wild Exhibitions – Walter Egan (BSR-5400)
- 1983: Wonderland – Nils Lofgren (BSR-5421)
- 1983: Doctor Detroit soundtrack (BSR-6120)
- 1983: Hardchoir – Hardchoir (BSR-39009)
