= Tom Petty discography =

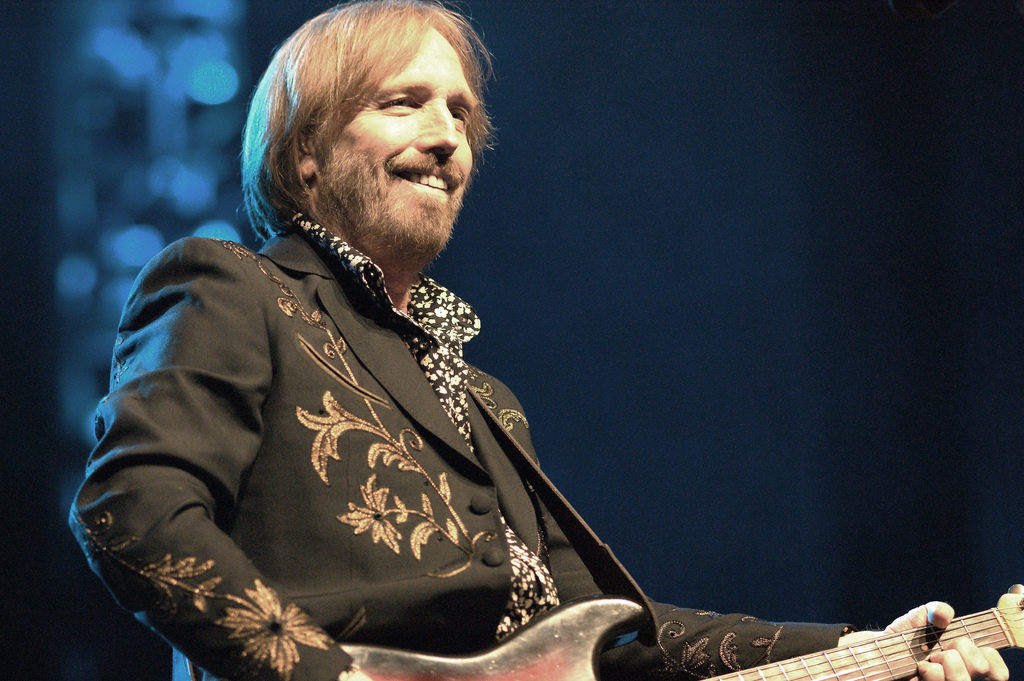
- Petty performing in 2010
- Studio albums: 16
- Extended plays: 1
- Soundtrack albums: 1
- Live albums: 11
- Compilation albums: 10
- Singles: 76
- Video albums: 14
- Music videos: 53

This is the discography of Tom Petty, who was an American singer, songwriter and guitarist. Petty released 13 studio albums as the lead singer of Tom Petty and the Heartbreakers, two with supergroup the Traveling Wilburys and two with his first band (and later, side project) Mudcrutch, in addition to three solo albums.

== Albums ==
=== Studio albums with the Heartbreakers ===
Title	Album details	Peak chart positions									Certifications (sales threshold)
Title	Album details	US	AUS	AUT	GER	NOR	NZ	SWE	SWI	UK	Certifications (sales threshold)
Tom Petty and the Heartbreakers	Released: November 9, 1976; Label: Shelter	55	57	—	—	—	18	—	—	24	RIAA: Gold
You're Gonna Get It!	Released: May 2, 1978; Label: Shelter	23	60	—	—	—	33	—	—	34	RIAA: Gold
Damn the Torpedoes	Released: October 19, 1979; Label: Backstreet/MCA	2	15	—	—	—	1	—	—	57	RIAA: 3× Platinum; MC: 2× Platinum
Hard Promises	Released: May 5, 1981; Label: Backstreet/MCA	5	21	—	—	—	1	22	—	32	RIAA: Platinum; AUS: Gold; MC: Platinum
Long After Dark	Released: November 2, 1982; Label: Backstreet/MCA	9	77	—	50	—	25	20	86	45	RIAA: Gold; MC: Gold
Southern Accents	Released: March 26, 1985; Label: MCA	7	53	—	—	—	25	10	—	23	RIAA: Platinum; CAN: Gold
Let Me Up (I've Had Enough)	Released: April 21, 1987; Label: MCA	20	63	—	—	—	23	15	—	59	RIAA: Gold; MC: Platinum
Into the Great Wide Open	Released: July 2, 1991; Label: MCA	13	28	7	8	5	12	2	12	3	RIAA: 2× Platinum; BPI: Gold; GLF: Platinum; IFPI SWI: Gold; MC: 2× Platinum
Songs and Music from "She's the One"	Released: August 6, 1996; Label: Warner Bros.	15	—	27	20	22	—	5	27	37	RIAA: Gold
Echo	Released: April 13, 1999; Label: Warner Bros.	10	—	27	5	—	43	5	39	43	RIAA: Gold; MC: Gold
The Last DJ	Released: October 8, 2002; Label: Warner Bros.	9	—	54	15	—	—	21	44	179	
Mojo	Released: June 15, 2010; Label: Reprise	2	52	42	12	9	11	3	27	38	
Hypnotic Eye	Released: July 28, 2014; Label: Reprise	1	30	18	5	16	10	6	14	7	
"—" denotes releases that did not chart.

=== Solo albums ===
Title	Album details	Peak chart positions									Certifications
Title	Album details	US	AUS	AUT	GER	NOR	NZ	SWE	SWI	UK	Certifications
Full Moon Fever	Released: April 29, 1989; Label: MCA	3	13	73	41	2	5	2	—	8	RIAA: 5× Platinum; BPI: Gold; GLF: Gold; MC: 6× Platinum
Wildflowers	Released: November 1, 1994; Label: Warner Bros.	5	38	13	15	20	29	7	17	19	RIAA: 3× Platinum; BPI: Silver; MC: 2× Platinum
Highway Companion	Released: July 25, 2006; Label: American Recordings	4	—	60	12	15	13	3	44	56	RIAA: Gold
"—" denotes releases that did not chart.

=== Live and compilation albums ===
Title	Year	Peak chart positions									Certifications	Record label
Title	Year	US	AUS	AUT	GER	NOR	NZ	SWE	SWI	UK	Certifications	Record label
Official Live 'Leg (promo)	1977	—	—	—	—	—	—	—	—	—		Shelter
Pack Up the Plantation: Live!	1985	22	24	—	—	—	11	26	—	—		MCA
Greatest Hits	1993	2	9	22	18	9	2	9	23	10	RIAA:12× Platinum; ARIA: Gold; BPI: Platinum; GLF: Gold; IFPI NOR: Gold; MC: 2× Platinum	MCA
Playback	1995	—	—	—	—	—	—	—	—	—	RIAA: Platinum	MCA
Anthology: Through the Years	2000	32	51	—	96	—	19	—	—	14	RIAA: Gold; BPI: Gold	MCA
The Live Anthology	2009	51	—	—	—	—	—	—	—	—		Warner Bros.
Mojo Tour 2010	2010	—	—	—	—	—	—	—	—	—		Self-released
Kiss My Amps (Live)	2011	—	—	—	—	—	—	—	—	—		Rhino
Live 2013	2014	—	—	—	—	—	—	—	—	—		Self-released
Kiss My Amps (Live), Vol. 2	2016	—	—	—	—	—	—	—	—	—		Warner Bros.
Live at Fenway Park: 2014	2016	—	—	—	—	—	—	—	—	—		Self-released
An American Treasure	2018	9	80	46	9	—	—	38	37	38		Reprise
The Best of Everything	2019	16	73	60	24	—	—	—	42	38	BPI: Silver	Geffen
Wildflowers & All the Rest	2020	5	—	9	4	14	35	15	10	19		Warner Records
Finding Wildflowers (Alternate Versions)	2021	112	—	—	17	—	—	—	—	—		Warner Records
Angel Dream	2021	74	—	—	80	—	—	—	31	—		Warner Records
Live at the Fillmore 1997	2022	35	—	44	9	—	—	—	17	74		Warner Records
The Gennaro Tapes (Live in Edinburgh 1982)	2024	—	—	—	—	—	—	—	—	—		Third Man Records
Heartbreakers Beach Party: The Soundtrack	2025	—	—	—	—	—	—	—	—	—		uDisover Music/UMG Recordings
July 16, 1978 – Paradise Theater, Boston, MA	2026	—	—	—	—	—	—	—	—	—		UMe
Origins 1971-1978	2026	—	—	—	31	—	—	—	—	—		UMe/Gone Gator Records
"—" denotes releases that did not chart.

== Other appearances ==
=== Studio ===
Year	Song(s)	Album
1992	"Christmas All Over Again" (Tom Petty and the Heartbreakers)	A Very Special Christmas 2
2001	"You're Gonna Change (Or I'm Gonna Leave)" (Tom Petty)	Timeless: Hank Williams Tribute
2001	"Blue Moon of Kentucky" (Tom Petty and the Heartbreakers)	Good Rockin' Tonight: The Legacy of Sun Records
2007	"I'm Walkin'" (Tom Petty and the Heartbreakers)	Goin' Home: A Tribute to Fats Domino

=== Live ===
Year	Song(s)	Album
1980	"Cry to Me" (Tom Petty and the Heartbreakers)	No Nukes: The Muse Concerts for a Non-Nuclear Future
1993	"License to Kill" (Tom Petty and the Heartbreakers) "Rainy Day Women #12 & 35" (Tom Petty and the Heartbreakers) "Mr. Tambourine Man" (Roger McGuinn with Tom Petty and the Heartbreakers) "My Back Pages" (Bob Dylan, Roger McGuinn, Tom Petty, Neil Young, Eric Clapton and George Harrison) "Knockin' on Heaven's Door" (All)	The 30th Anniversary Concert Celebration
1997	"Shadow of a Doubt (A Complex Kid)" (Tom Petty)	The Bridge School Concerts, Vol. 1
2001	"Little Red Rooster" (Tom Petty and the Heartbreakers)	A Very Special Christmas 5
2001	"I Won't Back Down" (Tom Petty and the Heartbreakers)	America: A Tribute to Heroes
2003	"Taxman" (Tom Petty and the Heartbreakers) "I Need You" (Tom Petty and the Heartbreakers) "Handle with Care" (Tom Petty and the Heartbreakers with Jeff Lynne and Dhani Harrison)	Concert for George
2021	"Stay" (Bruce Springsteen and the E Street Band with Jackson Browne, Tom Petty and Rosemary Butler)	The Legendary 1979 No Nukes Concerts
2021	"Stay" (Bruce Springsteen and the E Street Band with Jackson Browne, Tom Petty and Rosemary Butler)	The Live Series: Songs Under Cover Vol.2

=== Guest appearances ===
Year	Song(s)	Album
1981	"Stop Draggin’ My Heart Around", "Outside the Rain" (Stevie Nicks)	Bella Donna
1983	"I Will Run to You" (Stevie Nicks)	The Wild Heart
1984	"Girls" (Dwight Twilley)	Jungle
1988	"Dancin' Clown" (Joni Mitchell with Billy Idol and Tom Petty)	Chalk Mark in a Rain Storm
1991	"King of the Hill", "The Trees Are All Gone" (Roger McGuinn)	Back from Rio
1991	"Picture Show" (John Prine [ft. Tom Petty])	The Missing Years
1996	"One More Shot" (Carl Perkins & Tom Petty and the Heartbreakers)"Give Me Back My Job" (Carl Perkins, Bono, Johnny Cash, Willie Nelson & Tom Petty) "Restless" (Carl Perkins & Tom Petty and the Heartbreakers)	Go Cat Go!
1996	All tracks (Johnny Cash backed by Tom Petty and the Heartbreakers)	Unchained
2014	"Rock and Roll Records" (Eric Clapton & Tom Petty) "I Got the Same Old Blues" (Eric Clapton & Tom Petty) "The Old Man and Me" (Tom Petty)	The Breeze: An Appreciation of JJ Cale

== Singles ==
Title	Year	Peak chart positions									Certifications	Album
Title	Year	US	US Rock	US AAA	AUS	CAN	GER	NLD	NZ	UK	Certifications	Album
"Breakdown"	1976	—	—	—	—	—	—	—	—	—	RMNZ: Gold	Tom Petty and the Heartbreakers
"American Girl"	1977	—	—	—	—	—	—	—	—	40	BPI: Gold	Tom Petty and the Heartbreakers
"Anything That's Rock 'n' Roll"	1977	—	—	—	—	—	—	—	—	36		Tom Petty and the Heartbreakers
"Breakdown" (re-release)	1977	40	—	—	59	40	—	—	—	—		Tom Petty and the Heartbreakers
"I Need to Know"	1978	41	—	—	—	46	—	—	—	—		You're Gonna Get It!
"Listen to Her Heart"	1978	59	—	—	—	66	—	—	—	—		You're Gonna Get It!
"Don't Do Me Like That"	1979	10	—	—	—	3	—	—	17	—	RMNZ: Gold	Damn the Torpedoes
"Refugee"	1980	15	—	—	24	2	—	24	3	—	RMNZ: Platinum	Damn the Torpedoes
"Here Comes My Girl"	1980	59	—	—	—	82	—	—	41	—		Damn the Torpedoes
"The Waiting"	1981	19	1	—	38	6	—	—	27	—		Hard Promises
"A Woman in Love (It's Not Me)"	1981	79	5	—	—	—	—	—	—	—		Hard Promises
"You Got Lucky"	1982	20	1	—	62	30	—	—	—	—		Long After Dark
"Straight into Darkness"	1982	—	—	—	—	—	—	—	—	—		Long After Dark
"Change of Heart"	1983	21	10	—	—	36	—	—	—	—		Long After Dark
"Don't Come Around Here No More"	1985	13	2	—	61	20	—	—	42	50		Southern Accents
"Make It Better (Forget About Me)"	1985	54	12	—	—	73	—	—	—	141		Southern Accents
"Rebels"	1985	74	5	—	—	—	—	—	—	—		Southern Accents
"So You Want to Be a Rock 'n' Roll Star"	1985	—	9	—	—	—	—	—	—	—		Pack Up the Plantation–Live!
"Needles and Pins" (with Stevie Nicks)	1986	37	17	—	—	85	—	—	—	—		Pack Up the Plantation–Live!
"Refugee" (live)	1986	—	—	—	—	—	—	—	—	—		Pack Up the Plantation–Live!
"Jammin' Me"	1987	18	1	—	94	41	—	—	38	—		Let Me Up (I've Had Enough)
"All Mixed Up"	1987	—	19	—	—	—	—	—	—	—		Let Me Up (I've Had Enough)
"I Won't Back Down"	1989	12	1	—	16	5	66	—	49	28	BPI: Gold; RMNZ: 3× Platinum	Full Moon Fever
"Runnin' Down a Dream"	1989	23	1	—	68	23	—	—	—	55	BPI: Silver; RMNZ: 2× Platinum	Full Moon Fever
"Free Fallin'"	1989	7	1	—	59	5	—	61	4	59	BPI: Platinum; IFPI DEN: Gold; RMNZ: 6× Platinum	Full Moon Fever
"A Face in the Crowd"	1990	46	5	—	—	20	—	25	—	93		Full Moon Fever
"Yer So Bad"	1990	—	5	—	—	44	—	—	—	—		Full Moon Fever
"Learning to Fly"	1991	28	1	—	44	5	31	—	28	46	BPI: Silver; RMNZ: 3× Platinum	Into the Great Wide Open
"Into the Great Wide Open"	1991	92	4	—	112	23	58	—	—	79	RMNZ: Gold	Into the Great Wide Open
"Too Good to Be True"	1992	—	—	—	—	—	—	—	—	34		Into the Great Wide Open
"Kings Highway"	1992	—	4	—	—	31	—	—	—	76		Into the Great Wide Open
"All or Nothin'"	1992	—	—	—	—	—	—	—	—	—		Into the Great Wide Open
"Peace in L.A."	1992	—	—	—	—	—	—	—	—	—		Non-album single
"Mary Jane's Last Dance"	1993	14	1	—	—	5	63	26	—	52	RMNZ: 3× Platinum	Greatest Hits
"Something in the Air"	1994	—	19	—	—	26	—	—	—	53		Greatest Hits
"American Girl"	1994	—	—	—	—	—	—	—	—	—	BPI: Silver; RMNZ: Platinum	Greatest Hits
"You Don't Know How It Feels"	1994	13	1	—	98	3	—	—	—	91	RMNZ: Gold	Wildflowers
"You Wreck Me"	1995	—	2	—	72	8	—	—	—	88		Wildflowers
"It's Good to Be King"	1995	68	6	—	—	8	—	—	—	—		Wildflowers
"A Higher Place"	1995	—	12	—	—	5	—	—	—	—		Wildflowers
"Walls (Circus)"	1996	69	6	1	—	2	—	—	—	—		Songs and Music from "She's the One"
"Free Girl Now"	1999	—	5	3	—	6	—	—	—	—		Echo
"Room at the Top"	1999	—	19	1	—	—	—	—	—	—		Echo
"Saving Grace"	2006	100	26	1	—	—	—	—	—	198		Highway Companion
"Flirting with Time"	2006	—	—	18	—	—	—	—	—	—		Highway Companion
"Good Enough"	2010	—	—	—	—	—	—	—	—	—		Mojo
"I Should Have Known It"	2010	—	40	4	—	—	—	—	—	—		Mojo
"First Flash of Freedom"	2010	—	—	—	—	—	—	—	—	—		Mojo
"Don't Pull Me Over"	2010	—	—	—	—	—	—	—	—	—		Mojo
"American Dream Plan B"	2014	—	—	—	—	—	—	—	—	—		Hypnotic Eye
"U Get Me High"	2014	—	—	2	—	—	—	—	—	—		Hypnotic Eye
"Forgotten Man"	2014	—	—	24	—	—	—	—	—	—		Hypnotic Eye
"Somewhere Under Heaven"	2015	—	—	—	—	—	—	—	—	—		Non-album single
"Keep a Little Soul"	2018	—	—	3	—	—	—	—	—	—		An American Treasure
"You and Me"	2018	—	—	—	—	—	—	—	—	—		An American Treasure
"Gainesville"	2018	—	—	—	—	—	—	—	—	—		An American Treasure
"The Best of Everything" (Alternate version)	2019	—	—	—	—	—	—	—	—	—		The Best of Everything
"For Real"	2019	—	—	28	—	—	—	—	—	—		The Best of Everything
"There Goes Angela (Dream Away)"	2020	—	—	—	—	—	—	—	—	—		Wildflowers and All the Rest
"Confusion Wheel"	2020	—	—	—	—	—	—	—	—	—		Wildflowers and All the Rest
"Leave Virginia Alone"	2020	—	—	6	—	—	—	—	—	—		Wildflowers and All the Rest
"Something Could Happen"	2020	—	—	—	—	—	—	—	—	—		Wildflowers and All the Rest
"I Won't Back Down"	2022	—	—	—	—	—	—	—	—	—		Live at the Fillmore 1997
"Call Me the Breeze"	2022	—	—	—	—	—	—	—	—	—		Live at the Fillmore 1997
"—" denotes releases that did not chart.

== Promotional singles and other charted songs ==
All songs not released on singles, except where noted.

Title	Year	Peak chart position					Certifications	Album
Title	Year	US Rock	US AAA	US Hot Rock	US LyricFind	CAN	Certifications	Album
"Nightwatchman" (B-side of "The Waiting")	1981	21	—	—	—	—	—	Hard Promises
"We Stand a Chance"	1982	37	—	—	—	—	—	Long After Dark
"Between Two Worlds"	1982	35	—	—	—	—	—	Long After Dark
"A One Story Town"	1982	15	—	—	—	—	—	Long After Dark
"Runaway Trains"	1987	6	—	—	—	—	—	Let Me Up (I've Had Enough)
"Think About Me"	1987	36	—	—	—	—	—	Let Me Up (I've Had Enough)
"Feel a Whole Lot Better"	1989	18	—	—	—	—	—	Full Moon Fever
"Love Is a Long Road" (B-side of "Free Fallin'" in the UK and "Yer So Bad" in the US)	1989	7	—	—	—	—	—	Full Moon Fever
"Out in the Cold" (promo)	1991	1	—	—	—	65	—	Into the Great Wide Open
"Makin' Some Noise" (promo)	1991	30	—	—	—	75	—	Into the Great Wide Open
"Wildflowers"	1994	–	—	16	3	—	RMNZ: Platinum	Wildflowers
"Cabin Down Below" (promo)	1995	29	—	—	—	—	—	Wildflowers
"Waiting for Tonight"	1995	6	1	—	—	—	—	Playback
"Climb That Hill" (promo)	1996	6	12	—	—	15	—	Songs and Music from "She's the One"
"Change the Locks" (promo)	1996	20	—	—	—	42	—	Songs and Music from "She's the One"
"Swingin'" (promo)	1999	17	11	—	—	—	—	Echo
"This One's for Me" (promo)	1999	—	—	—	—	—	—	Echo
"Accused of Love" (promo)	1999	—	—	—	—	—	—	Echo
"The Last DJ" (promo)	2002	22	12	—	—	—	—	The Last DJ
"Have Love Will Travel" (promo)	2002	—	—	—	—	—	—	The Last DJ
"You and Me" (promo)	2002	—	—	—	—	—	—	The Last DJ
"High in the Morning"	2010	—	23	—	—	—	—	Mojo

== Guest singles ==
Title	Year	Artist	Peak chart positions									Certifications	Album
Title	Year	Artist	US	US Rock	US Country	AUS	CAN	CAN Country	NLD	NZ	UK	Certifications	Album
"Stop Draggin' My Heart Around"	1981	Stevie Nicks (with Tom Petty and the Heartbreakers)	3	2	—	10	5	—	43	11	50	RMNZ: Platinum	Bella Donna
"Band of the Hand"	1986	Bob Dylan and the Heartbreakers	—	28	—	—	—	—	—	—	96		Band of the Hand soundtrack
"Mind Your Own Business"	1987	Hank Williams Jr. (with Reba McEntire, Tom Petty, Reverend Ike, and Willie Nelson)	—	—	1	—	—	1	—	—	—		Montana Cafe
"King of the Hill"	1991	Roger McGuinn	—	2	—	—	—	—	—	—	—		Back from Rio
"—" denotes releases that did not chart.

=== Other charted guest songs ===
Title	Year	Artist	Chart positions	Album
Title	Year	Artist	US Rock	Album
"I Will Run to You"	1983	Stevie Nicks (with Tom Petty and the Heartbreakers)	35	The Wild Heart

== Releases with the Traveling Wilburys ==
=== Albums ===
Title	Year	Peak chart positions			Certifications	Record label
Title	Year	US	AUS	UK	Certifications	Record label
Traveling Wilburys Vol. 1	1988	3	1	16	RIAA: 3× Platinum; MC: 6× Platinum	Wilbury Records
Traveling Wilburys Vol. 3	1990	11	14	14	RIAA: Platinum; MC: Platinum	Wilbury Records
The Traveling Wilburys Collection	2007	9	1	1	RIAA: Gold	Wilbury Records
"—" denotes releases that did not chart.

=== Singles ===
Title	Year	Peak chart positions					Album
Title	Year	US	US Rock	US AC	AUS	UK	Album
"Handle with Care"	1988	45	2	30	3	21	Traveling Wilburys Vol. 1
"End of the Line"	1989	63	2	28	12	52	Traveling Wilburys Vol. 1
"Nobody's Child"	1990	—	—	—	66	44	Nobody's Child: Romanian Angel Appeal
"She's My Baby"	1990	—	2	—	45	79	Traveling Wilburys Vol. 3
"Wilbury Twist"	1991	—	46	—	—	—	Traveling Wilburys Vol. 3
"—" denotes releases that did not chart.

=== Other charted songs ===
Title	Year	Chart positions	Album
Title	Year	US Rock	Album
"Last Night"	1988	5	Traveling Wilburys Vol. 1
"Tweeter and the Monkey Man"	1989	41	Traveling Wilburys Vol. 1
"Heading for the Light"	1989	7	Traveling Wilburys Vol. 1
"Inside Out"	1990	16	Traveling Wilburys Vol. 3

== Releases with Mudcrutch ==
=== Albums ===
Title	Year	Peak chart positions			Record label
Title	Year	US	CAN	SWE	Record label
Mudcrutch	2008	8	25	15	Reprise Records
2	2016	10	—	—	Reprise Records

=== Live albums ===
Title	Album details
The Very Best Performances from the 2016 Mudcrutch Tour	Released: 2017; Self-released

=== Extended plays ===
Title	EP details
Mudcrutch Extended Play Live	Released: 2008; Formats: CD

=== Singles ===
Title	Year	Album
"Up in Mississippi"	1971	Non-album single
"Depot Street"	1975	Non-album single
"Scare Easy"	2008	Mudcrutch
"Trailer"	2016	2
"How Much Do You Need"	2016	SiriusXM Exclusive

== Videography ==
=== Videos and DVDs ===
Title	Video details	Certifications (sales threshold)
Pack Up the Plantation – Live!	Released: 1985, 1986; Label: MCA Home Video; Format: VHS, Betamax; out of print	
Bob Dylan with Tom Petty and the Heartbreakers – Hard to Handle	Released: October 1986; Label: CBS Fox Video Music; Format: VHS, laserdisc; out of print	
A Bunch of Videos and Some Other Stuff	Released: 1989; April 10, 1991; Label: Mobile Fidelity Sound Lab; Format: VHS, laserdisc, out of print	
Full Moon Fever: The Videos	Released: 1990; Label: MCA; Format: VHS, laserdisc; out of print	RIAA: Gold
Take the Highway Live	Released: 1992; Label: BMG Video / Media Frem; Format: VHS, laserdisc; out of print	
Playback	Released: 1995; Label: MCA; Format: VHS, laserdisc; DVD released in 2000	RIAA: Gold
High Grass Dogs: Live from the Fillmore	Released: November 9, 1999; Label: Warner Bros.; Format: VHS, DVD	RIAA: Gold
Live at the Olympic: The Last DJ	Released: July 22, 2003; Label: Warner Bros.; Format: DVD	
Soundstage Presents Live in Concert	Released: January 11, 2005; Label: Koch Vision; Format: DVD, Blu-ray	RIAA: Gold
Runnin' Down a Dream	Released: November 23, 2007; Label: Rhino; Format: DVD, Blu-ray	RIAA: Platinum
From Gainesville: The 30th Anniversary Concert	Released: 2009; Label: Reprise Records; Format: DVD	
Classic Albums: Damn the Torpedoes	Released: August 3, 2010; Label: Eagle Rock Ent; Format: DVD, Blu-ray	
Somewhere You Feel Free: The Making of Wildflowers	Released: March 17, 2021 (SXSW); October 20, 2021 (Trafalgar); November 11, 2021 (YouTube); September 12, 2025 (disc); Label: Warner Records; Format: Theatrical, Streaming, Blu-ray	
Heartbreakers Beach Party	Released: October 17, 2024 (Trafalgar); March 11, 2025 (Paramount+); Label: Petty Legacy/MTV; Format: Theatrical, Streaming	

=== Music videos ===
Year	Title	Album
1980	"Refugee"	Damn the Torpedoes
1980	"Here Comes My Girl"	Damn the Torpedoes
1981	"The Waiting"	Hard Promises
1981	"Insider" (with Stevie Nicks)	Hard Promises
1981	"A Woman in Love (It's Not Me)"	Hard Promises
1981	"Letting You Go"	Hard Promises
1982	"You Got Lucky"	Long After Dark
1983	"Change of Heart"	Long After Dark
1985	"Don't Come Around Here No More"	Southern Accents
1985	"Make It Better (Forget About Me)"	Southern Accents
1985	"Rebels"	Southern Accents
1987	"Jammin' Me"	Let Me Up (I've Had Enough)
1989	"I Won't Back Down"	Full Moon Fever
1989	"Runnin' Down a Dream"	Full Moon Fever
1989	"Free Fallin'"	Full Moon Fever
1990	"A Face in the Crowd"	Full Moon Fever
1990	"Yer So Bad"	Full Moon Fever
1991	"Learning to Fly"	Into the Great Wide Open
1991	"Into the Great Wide Open"	Into the Great Wide Open
1991	"Kings Highway" (live)	Into the Great Wide Open
1992	"Peace in L.A."	non-album
1993	"Mary Jane's Last Dance"	Greatest Hits
1994	"You Don't Know How It Feels"	Wildflowers
1995	"You Wreck Me"	Wildflowers
1995	"It's Good to Be King"	Wildflowers
1996	"Walls (Circus)"	Songs and Music from "She's the One"
1999	"Room at the Top"	Echo
1999	"Swingin'"	Echo
2006	"Saving Grace"	Highway Companion
2010	"I Should Have Known It"	Mojo
2010	"Something Good Coming"	Mojo
2010	"Jefferson Jericho Blues"	Mojo
2010	"Don't Pull Me Over"	Mojo
2018	"Keep a Little Soul"	An American Treasure
2018	"You and Me (Clubhouse Version)" (2 versions)	An American Treasure
2018	"Gainesville"	An American Treasure
2019	"For Real"	The Best of Everything
2020	"Wildflowers (Home Recording)"	Wildflowers & All the Rest
2020	"Leave Virginia Alone"	Wildflowers & All the Rest
2020	"Something Could Happen"	Wildflowers & All the Rest
2021	"You Saw Me Comin'"	Finding Wildflowers (Alternate Versions)
2021	"Drivin' Down to Georgia"	Finding Wildflowers (Alternate Versions)
2021	"105 Degrees" (lyric video)	Angel Dream
2021	"Angel Dream (No. 2)"	Angel Dream
2022	"Listen to Her Heart"	Live at the Fillmore 1997
2022	"Call Me the Breeze"	Live at the Fillmore 1997
2022	"American Girl"	Live at the Fillmore 1997
2022	"Runnin' Down a Dream" (lyric video)	Live at the Fillmore 1997
2023	"Help Me"	Extra Mojo Version
2024	"Straight into Darkness"	Long After Dark (Deluxe Edition)
2024	"Never Be You"	Long After Dark (Deluxe Edition)
2025	"Wild Thing"	Long After Dark (Deluxe Edition)
