= Live at the Fillmore 1997 =

Live album by Tom Petty and the Heartbreakers
- Released: November 25, 2022
- Recorded: January 31 – February 7, 1997
- Venue: The Fillmore
- Genre: Heartland rock
- Length: 243:34
- Label: Warner
- Producers: Mike Campbell; Ryan Ulyate

Tom Petty and the Heartbreakers chronology
Angel Dream (2021)	Live at the Fillmore 1997 (2022)	Origins, 1971-1978 (2026)

Singles from Live at the Fillmore 1997
- 1. "Listen to Her Heart" Released: September 21, 2022; 2. "I Won't Back Down" Released: October 14, 2022; 3. "Call Me the Breeze" Released: November 4, 2022

Live at the Fillmore 1997 is a 2022 live album compiling Tom Petty and the Heartbreakers 20-concert residency at The Fillmore in San Francisco in January and February 1997. The full 'deluxe' version of the album includes 72 tracks pulled primarily from the last six concerts performed in the residency, of which 58 are songs and 14 are 'spoken word' interludes. Those six shows were professionally recorded and tracks from the setlists in those shows have been previously released on The Live Anthology and the 2020 expanded reissue of Petty's 1994 album Wildflowers.

Tom Petty considered the residency by the Heartbreakers at the Fillmore "a highlight of his career" and guitarist Mike Campbell labeled the concerts "some of my favorite gigs ever." During the final concert at the Fillmore, Petty remarked to the audience that, "We all feel this might be the highpoint of our time together as a group… It’s going to be hard to get us off this stage tonight."

In addition to a selection of the Heartbreakers and Tom Petty's solo tracks from their career by 1997, the residency and the album documented the band's music interests and featured performances by guests such as Roger McGuinn and John Lee Hooker. Of the 58 songs included in the collection, 35 are covers of songs by those that influenced, inspired, or performed with Tom Petty and the Heartbreakers. The first two singles released from the set in September and October 2022 highlighted performances of "Listen to Her Heart" and "I Won't Back Down," while the third single released in early November 2022, "Call Me the Breeze," showcased one of three tracks originally by J. J. Cale covered by the band during the Fillmore residency.

== Track listing ==
The album was released across a variety of formats, the following track list represents the four CD deluxe version.

All tracks are written by Tom Petty, except where noted.

Disc 1
No.	Title	Writer(s)	Length
1.	"Pre-Show" (spoken interlude)		0:41
2.	"Around and Around"	Chuck Berry	2:26
3.	"Jammin' Me"	Petty, Bob Dylan, Mike Campbell	4:21
4.	"Runnin' Down a Dream"	Petty, Jeff Lynne, Campbell	4:53
5.	"Good Evening" (spoken interlude)		0:44
6.	"Lucille"	Albert Collins, Little Richard	2:31
7.	"Call Me the Breeze"	J. J. Cale	5:58
8.	"Cabin Down Below"		2:53
9.	"The Internet, Whatever That Is" (spoken interlude)		0:16
10.	"Time Is on My Side"	Jerry Ragovoy, Jimmy Norman	3:06
11.	"Listen to Her Heart"		3:19
12.	"Waitin' in School"	Jerry Livingston, Mack David	2:01
13.	"Let's Hear It for Mike" (spoken interlude)		0:18
14.	"Slaughter on Tenth Avenue"	Richard Rodgers	2:27
15.	"Homecoming Queen Intro" (spoken interlude)		0:12
16.	"The Date I Had with That Ugly Old Homecoming Queen"	Petty, Campbell	5:09
17.	"I Won't Back Down"	Petty, Lynne	3:42
18.	"You Are My Sunshine"	Jimmie Davis	1:45
19.	"Ain't No Sunshine"	Bill Withers	3:28
20.	"It's Good to Be King"		11:52
Total length:			61:50

Disc 2
No.	Title	Writer(s)	Length
1.	"Rip It Up"	John Marascalco, Robert Blackwell	1:47
2.	"You Don’t Know How It Feels"		6:39
3.	"I’d Like To Love You Baby"	Cale	4:14
4.	"Diddy Wah Diddy"	Willie Dixon, Elias McDaniel	3:00
5.	"We Got a Long Way to Go" (spoken interlude)		0:31
6.	"Guitar Boogie Shuffle"	Arthur Smith	2:55
7.	"I Want You Back Again"	Rod Argent	3:05
8.	"On the Street Intro" (spoken interlude)		0:14
9.	"On the Street"	Benmont Tench	2:21
10.	"California"		2:48
11.	"Let's hear It for Scott and Howie" (spoken interlude)		0:31
12.	"Little Maggie"	Ralph Stanley	2:38
13.	"Walls"		3:28
14.	"Hip Hugger"	Al Jackson, Booker T. Jones, Donald Dunn, Steve Cropper	2:56
15.	"Friend of the Devil"	Jerry Garcia and John Dawson (music), Robert Hunter (lyrics)	5:52
16.	"Did Someone Say Heartbreakers Beach Party?" (spoken interlude)		0:38
17.	"Heartbreakers Beach Party"	Tom Petty and the Heartbreakers	3:46
18.	"Angel Dream"		2:59
19.	"The Wild One, Forever"		3:12
20.	"Even the Losers"		3:14
21.	"American Girl"		2:32
22.	"You Really Got Me"	Ray Davies	2:33
23.	"Goldfinger"	John Barry (music) and Leslie Bricusse and Anthony Newley (lyrics)	4:14
Total length:			65:55

Disc 3
No.	Title	Writer(s)	Length
1.	"Mr. Roger McGuinn" (spoken interlude)		0:32
2.	"It Won't Be Wrong"	McGuinn, Harvey Gerst	1:58
3.	"You Ain't Goin' Nowhere"	Dylan	3:14
4.	"Drug Store Truck Drivin’ Man"	McGuinn, Gram Parsons	2:43
5.	"Eight Miles High"	McGuinn, Gene Clark, David Crosby	5:25
6.	"Crazy Mama"	Cale	4:34
7.	"Everyone Loves Benmont" (spoken interlude)		0:12
8.	"Green Onions"	Booker T. Jones, Steve Cropper, Lewie Steinberg, Al Jackson Jr.	4:28
9.	"High Heel Sneakers"	Tommy Tucker	3:28
10.	"John Lee Hooker, Ladies And Gentlemen" (spoken interlude)		0:19
11.	"Find My Baby (Locked Up In Love Again)"	John Lee Hooker	4:08
12.	"Serves You Right To Suffer"	Hooker	4:10
13.	"Boogie Chillen"	Hooker, Bernard Besman	7:50
14.	"I Got a Woman"	Ray Charles, Renald Richard	2:52
Total length:			45:59

Disc 4
No.	Title	Writer(s)	Length
1.	"Sorry, I’ve Just Broken My Amplifier" (spoken interlude)		0:56
2.	"Knockin' on Heaven's Door"	Dylan	5:04
3.	"Honey Bee"		5:09
4.	"County Farm"		7:47
5.	"You Wreck Me"	Petty, Campbell	4:13
6.	"Shakin' All Over"	Johnny Kidd, Guy Robinson	2:45
7.	"Free Fallin'"	Petty, Lynne	4:59
8.	"Mary Jane's Last Dance"		10:25
9.	"Johnny B. Goode"	Berry	3:48
10.	"(I Can't Get No) Satisfaction"	Jagger–Richards	2:57
11.	"It's All Over Now"	Bobby Womack, Shirley Womack	4:23
12.	"Louie Louie"	Richard Berry	3:52
13.	"Gloria"	Van Morrison	10:09
14.	"Alright for Now"		2:22
15.	"Goodnight" (spoken interlude)		1:17
Total length:			70:00

== Personnel ==
=== Tom Petty and the Heartbreakers ===
- Tom Petty – lead vocals, rhythm guitar, lead guitar, harmonica
- Mike Campbell – lead guitar, mandolin
- Benmont Tench – backing vocals, keyboards, piano, organ
- Howie Epstein – backing vocals, bass guitar
- Scott Thurston – backing vocals, rhythm guitar, harmonica, lead vocals on "Little Maggie"
- Steve Ferrone – drums, percussion

=== Production ===
- Mike Campbell – producer, curator
- Ryan Ulyate – producer, curator
- Benmont Tench – executive producer
- Adria Petty – executive producer
- Annakim Petty – executive producer
- Dana Petty – executive producer

== Charts ==
Chart performance for Live at the Fillmore 1997
Chart (2022)	Peak position
Austrian Albums (Ö3 Austria)	44
Belgian Albums (Ultratop Flanders)	81
Belgian Albums (Ultratop Wallonia)	54
German Albums (Offizielle Top 100)	9
Italian Albums (FIMI)	75
Scottish Albums (Official Charts)	14
Spanish Albums (Promusicae)	43
Swiss Albums (Schweizer Hitparade)	17
UK Albums (Official Charts)	74
US Billboard 200	35
