= List of Radio & Records number-one adult alternative singles of the 1990s =

Adult Alternative Songs, also known as Triple A, is a record chart that ranks the most-played songs on American adult album alternative radio stations. Formulated based on each song's weekly total plays, the chart was introduced in the September 22, 1995, issue of Radio & Records magazine, while Billboard's chart archives begin on January 20, 1996. Adult Alternative Songs, along with other Radio & Records airplay charts, was initially compiled using radio airplay data from Mediabase. In August 2006, Radio & Records was acquired by The Nielsen Company – then known as VNU Media – parent company of rival publication Billboard. Following the purchase, Nielsen Broadcast Data Systems replaced Mediabase in monitoring airplay for charts, beginning with the issue dated August 11, 2006. Billboard themselves introduced the chart in their July 5, 2008, issue, appropriating the same Nielsen data, and became its sole publisher after Radio & Records ceased publication in June 2009.

The Billboard website currently lists Adult Alternative Songs charts dating back to January 1996. The number ones listed in Radio & Records prior to that date are listed below. Billboard's charts are based on data from a Triple A chart that had previously been published in the Billboard-owned Airplay Monitor magazine from that date until the acquisition of Radio & Records, and which had used Nielsen data that was largely similar to the Mediabase data used in the Radio & Records chart.

== Number-one singles ==
Key

† – Radio & Records year-end number-one single
↑ – Return of a single to number one

Single	Artist	Reached number one	Weeks at number one
"Til I Hear It from You"	Gin Blossoms	September 22, 1995	3
"One of Us"	Joan Osborne	October 13, 1995	3
"Good Intentions"	Toad the Wet Sprocket	November 3, 1995	7
"Waiting for Tonight"	Tom Petty and the Heartbreakers	December 22, 1995	4
"The World I Know"	Collective Soul	January 20, 1996	1
"Waiting for Tonight"↑	Tom Petty and the Heartbreakers	January 27, 1996	1
"The World I Know" ↑	Collective Soul	February 3, 1996	3
"Follow You Down"	Gin Blossoms	February 24, 1996	5
"Everything Falls Apart"	Dog's Eye View	March 30, 1996	4
"Old Man & Me (When I Get to Heaven)"	Hootie & the Blowfish	April 27, 1996	9
"Too Much"	Dave Matthews Band	June 29, 1996	1
"Who Will Save Your Soul"	Jewel	July 6, 1996	1
"Change the World"	Eric Clapton	July 13, 1996	1
"Lack of Water"	The Why Store	July 20, 1996	1
"Standing Outside a Broken Phone Booth with Money in My Hand"	Primitive Radio Gods	July 27, 1996	5
"Walls"	Tom Petty and the Heartbreakers	August 31, 1996	2
"Key West Intermezzo (I Saw You First)"	John Mellencamp	September 14, 1996	6
"If It Makes You Happy"	Sheryl Crow	October 26, 1996	1
"Barely Breathing"	Duncan Sheik	November 2, 1996	1
"Bittersweet Me"	R.E.M.	November 9, 1996	4
"One Headlight"	The Wallflowers	December 7, 1996	8
"A Long December"	Counting Crows	February 1, 1997	2
"One Headlight" ↑†	The Wallflowers	February 15, 1997	6
"Staring at the Sun"	U2	March 29, 1997	7
"The Freshmen"	The Verve Pipe	May 17, 1997	5
"Four Leaf Clover"	Abra Moore	June 21, 1997	1
"A Change Would Do You Good"	Sheryl Crow	June 28, 1997	6
"Building a Mystery"	Sarah McLachlan	August 9, 1997	10
"Most Precarious"	Blues Traveler	October 18, 1997	6
"3 AM"	Matchbox 20	November 29, 1997	13
"The Mummers' Dance"	Loreena McKennitt	February 28, 1998	1
"3 AM" ↑	Matchbox 20	March 7, 1998	1
"My Father's Eyes"	Eric Clapton	March 14, 1998	7
"Don't Drink the Water"	Dave Matthews Band	May 2, 1998	1
"One Belief Away"	Bonnie Raitt	May 9, 1998	1
"The Way"	Fastball	May 16, 1998	3
"Kind & Generous"	Natalie Merchant	June 6, 1998	7
"Stay (Wasting Time)"	Dave Matthews Band	July 25, 1998	7
"Save Tonight"	Eagle-Eye Cherry	September 12, 1998	2
"Please"	Chris Isaak	September 26, 1998	2
"My Favorite Mistake"	Sheryl Crow	October 10, 1998	4
"Lullaby"	Shawn Mullins	November 7, 1998	3
"My Favorite Mistake" ↑	Sheryl Crow	November 28, 1998	1
"Daysleeper"	R.E.M.	December 5, 1998	2
"Slide"	Goo Goo Dolls	December 19, 1998	6
"You Get What You Give"	New Radicals	January 30, 1999	6
"Slide" ↑	Goo Goo Dolls	March 13, 1999	1
"Every Morning"	Sugar Ray	March 20, 1999	1
"Run"	Collective Soul	March 27, 1999	3
"I'm Not Running Anymore"	John Mellencamp	April 17, 1999	1
"Run" ↑	Collective Soul	April 24, 1999	2
"Anything but Down"	Sheryl Crow	May 8, 1999	5
"Room at the Top"	Tom Petty and the Heartbreakers	June 12, 1999	4
"Smooth"†	Santana feat. Rob Thomas	July 10, 1999	13
"Angels Would Fall"	Melissa Etheridge	October 9, 1999	3
"Hanginaround"	Counting Crows	October 30, 1999	8
"The Great Beyond"	R.E.M.	December 25, 1999	8
