= Time to Move On =

Time to Move On may refer to:

- Time to Move On (album), 1993 album by Billy Ocean
- Time to Move On (song), a 1994 song by Tom Petty
