= Canadian rock music charts =

Weekly alternative rock music chart

Canadian rock music charts have been published by several outlets since 1995.

== RPM charts ==
On June 11, 1995, Canadian music magazine RPM began publishing a weekly alternative rock music chart under the name Alternative 30. The song which held the number-one spot on this first chart was "More Human than Human" by White Zombie.

The chart took a break from December 14, 1998, to April 11, 1999, and returned on April 12 under the new name Rock Report. "Free Girl Now" by Tom Petty and the Heartbreakers debuted at the top of this newly named chart. On October 25, 1999, the chart made a slight change to the name Top 30 Rock Report. The chart kept this name until it was published for the last time on November 6, 2000, due to the ceasing of the RPM magazine's publication. The charts published by RPM are archived by Library and Archives Canada.

== Radio & Records charts ==
On April 16, 2004, the trade publication, Radio & Records partnered with Mediabase to launch five airplay charts in Canada, including a Rock chart.

== Billboard charts ==
Billboard publishes a Canada Mainstream Rock and Canada Modern Rock chart as of 2025.

== See also ==
- List of RPM Rock/Alternative number-one singles
