= Mojo Tour 2010 =

2010 live album by Tom Petty and the Heartbreakers

Live album by Tom Petty and the Heartbreakers
- Released: December 14, 2010
- Recorded: June 16 – October 7, 2010
- Genres: Heartland rock; blues rock
- Length: 43:12
- Label: Self-released

Tom Petty and the Heartbreakers chronology
Mojo (2010)	Mojo Tour 2010 (2010)	Kiss My Amps (Live) (2011)

Mojo Tour 2010 is a live album released by Tom Petty and the Heartbreakers. It was released exclusively through Tom Petty's official website on December 14, 2010 as a free download to anyone who purchased a ticket for his 2010 summer tour. Previously, Mojo was also given away as a free digital download to the same summer tour ticket customers.

An expanded edition of Mojo Tour 2010 was also released on the same date for members of the Highway Companions Club who joined the club between February 23, 2010 and February 24, 2011. The expanded edition is 73-minutes long and includes six additional live tracks from the summer tour.

The download was made available in three different formats. 320K MP3 (high quality), Apple Lossless (higher quality), and FLAC (highest quality).

== Track listing ==
All tracks are written by Tom Petty, with additional writers noted.

Mojo Tour 2010 track listing
No.	Title	Writer(s)	Location	Length
1.	"King's Highway" (June 16, 2010)		Rexall Place, Edmonton, Alberta	3:37
2.	"You Don't Know How It Feels" (July 31, 2010)		Wachovia Arena, Philadelphia, Pennsylvania	6:27
3.	"I Won't Back Down" (September 19, 2010)	Jeff Lynne	Verizon Wireless Amphitheater, Charlotte, North Carolina	3:04
4.	"Drivin' Down to Georgia" (August 11, 2010)		Philips Arena, Atlanta, Georgia	6:37
5.	"Breakdown" (August 15, 2010)		Jiffy Lube Live, Bristow, Virginia	7:29
6.	"I Should Have Known It" (June 16, 2010)	Mike Campbell	Rexall Place, Edmonton, Alberta	4:22
7.	"Good Enough" (July 31, 2010)	Campbell	Wachovia Arena, Philadelphia, Pennsylvania	5:56
8.	"Runnin' Down a Dream" (October 7, 2010)	Lynne, Campbell	U.S. Airways Arena, Phoenix, Arizona	5:40
Total length:				43:12

Extended edition
No.	Title	Writer(s)	Location	Length
1.	"Listen to Her Heart" (June 25, 2010)		Summerfest-Marcus Amphitheater, Milwaukee, Wisconsin	3:38
2.	"King's Highway" (June 16, 2010)		Rexall Place, Edmonton, Alberta	3:26
3.	"You Don't Know How It Feels" (July 31, 2010)		Wachovia Arena, Philadelphia, Pennsylvania	6:27
4.	"I Won't Back Down" (September 19, 2010)	Lynne	Verizon Wireless Amphitheater, Charlotte, North Carolina	3:04
5.	"Drivin' Down to Georgia" (August 11, 2010)		Philips Arena, Atlanta, Georgia	6:37
6.	"Breakdown" (August 15, 2010)		Jiffy Lube Live, Bristow, Virginia	7:29
7.	"Jefferson Jericho Blues" (August 1, 2010)		Wachovia Arena, Philadelphia, Pennsylvania	3:41
8.	"First Flash of Freedom" (August 1, 2010)	Campbell	Wachovia Arena, Philadelphia, Pennsylvania	6:27
9.	"Running Man's Bible" (September 18, 2010)		Time Warner Cable Music Pavilion, Raleigh, North Carolina	6:10
10.	"I Should Have Known It" (June 16, 2010)	Campbell	Rexall Place, Edmonton, Alberta	4:13
11.	"Good Enough" (July 31, 2010)	Campbell	Wachovia Arena, Philadelphia, Pennsylvania	5:56
12.	"Refugee" (June 12, 2010)	Campbell	Gorge Amphitheatre, Quincy, Washington	5:07
13.	"Runnin' Down a Dream" (October 7, 2010)	Lynne, Campbell	U.S. Airways Arena, Phoenix, Arizona	4:57
14.	"American Girl" (June 16, 2010)		Rexall Place, Edmonton, Alberta	5:23
Total length:				72:35

== Personnel ==
- Tom Petty – lead vocals, 6 and 12 string acoustic and electric guitars, percussion
- Mike Campbell – lead guitar, slide guitar, 12-string guitar, mandolin, electric sitar
- Benmont Tench – acoustic and electric pianos, Hammond and combo organs, synthesizer, backing vocals
- Scott Thurston – rhythm guitar, synthesizer, harmonica, backing vocals
- Ron Blair – bass guitar, backing vocals
- Steve Ferrone – drums, percussion
