= Live at the Olympic: The Last DJ =

Video by Tom Petty and the Heartbreakers
- Released: September 16, 2003
- Recorded: Grand Olympic Auditorium, October 16, 2002
- Genre: Rock
- Length: 108 min (approx.)
- Label: Warner Bros.
- Director: Keith Hobelman
- Producer: George Drakoulias; Tom Petty; Mike Campbell

Tom Petty and the Heartbreakers chronology
The Last DJ (2002)	Live at the Olympic: The Last DJ (2003)	Highway Companion (2006)

Professional ratings
Review scores
Source	Rating
Allmusic	link

Live at the Olympic: The Last DJ is a live DVD by American musician rock band Tom Petty and the Heartbreakers, first released in September 2003 (see 2003 in music). The film features the band's 2002 album The Last DJ performed in its entirety. Also featured are several of the band's other songs, and "You Wreck Me" from Petty's 1994 solo album Wildflowers. It was directed by Martyn Atkins.

The DVD package includes a Bonus CD containing four covers, recorded for the PBS program Soundstage.

== DVD listing ==
1. "The Last DJ"
2. "Money Becomes King"
3. "Dreamville"
4. "Joe"
5. "When a Kid Goes Bad"
6. "Like a Diamond"
7. "Lost Children"
8. "Blue Sunday"
9. "You and Me"
10. "The Man Who Loves Women"
11. "Have Love Will Travel"
12. "Can't Stop the Sun"
13. "Change of Heart"
14. "I Need to Know"
15. "Shake, Rattle and Roll" (Charles E. Calhoun)
16. "Around and Around" (Chuck Berry)
17. "Mary Jane's Last Dance"
18. "You Wreck Me"

=== Bonus CD: Bad Girl Boogie ===
1. "I'm Crying" (Alan Price, Eric Burdon) – 4:17
2. "Done Somebody Wrong" (Elmore James) – 4:07
3. "I Got a Woman" (Ray Charles) – 3:01
4. "Carol" (Chuck Berry) – 5:29

== Personnel ==
Tom Petty and the Heartbreakers

- Tom Petty – lead vocals, lead & rhythm guitar
- Mike Campbell – lead guitar
- Benmont Tench – piano, organ, synthesizer, backing vocals
- Ron Blair – bass, backing vocals
- Scott Thurston – rhythm guitar, synthesizer, lap steel guitar, ukulele, backing vocals
- Steve Ferrone – drums, percussion

Additional musicians

- Jon Brion – conductor
- The Big Money Orchestra – strings, horns
