= Saving Grace (Tom Petty song) =

Single by Tom Petty

from the album Highway Companion
- B-side: "Big Weekend"
- Released: July 4, 2006
- Recorded: 2005–2006
- Studio: Bungalow Palace and Shoreline Recorders, Los Angeles
- Genre: Rock; blues rock; boogie rock
- Length: 3:46
- Label: Warner Bros.; American
- Songwriter: Tom Petty
- Producers: Jeff Lynne; Tom Petty; Mike Campbell

Tom Petty singles chronology
"The Last DJ" (2002)	"Saving Grace" (2006)	"Flirting with Time" (2006)

"Saving Grace" is a song by American musician Tom Petty and is the lead track on his 2006 album, Highway Companion. In July 2006, "Saving Grace" was released as the first radio single from the album. The song, as well as its B-side "Big Weekend", was released on the iTunes Store on July 4, 2006. The single received a physical release in the United Kingdom in early August 2006.

== Track listings ==
=== iTunes tracks ===
1. "Saving Grace" – 3:46
2. "Big Weekend" – 3:15

=== UK single ===
- CD W727CD
1. "Saving Grace" – 3:54
2. "Square One" (Live) – 3:46

== Personnel ==
- Tom Petty – lead vocals, background vocals, 12-string rhythm guitar, drums, piano, handclaps
- Mike Campbell – slide guitar, rhythm guitar, handclaps
- Jeff Lynne – bass guitar, rhythm guitar, background vocals, organ, handclaps

== Chart performance ==
"Saving Grace" debuted the week ending July 22, 2006 on Billboard's Hot 100 chart at No. 100, the Mainstream Rock Tracks chart at No. 34, and the Pop 100 chart at No. 85. The song improved in the Mainstream Rock Tracks chart to No. 26 over the course of four weeks. It also reached #1 on the Adult Alternative Songs chart.

Chart (2006)	Peak position
U.S. Billboard Hot 100	100
U.S. Billboard Mainstream Rock Tracks	26
U.S. Billboard Pop 100	85
U.S. Billboard Triple A	1
