= Time to Move On (song) =

1994 song by Tom Petty

Song by Tom Petty

from the album Wildflowers
- Released: 1994
- Genre: Folk rock; heartland rock
- Length: 3:14
- Label: Warner Bros.
- Songwriter: Tom Petty
- Producer: Rick Rubin

"Time to Move On" is a song by Tom Petty from his second solo studio album Wildflowers (1994). A live version was released on the live disc of the 2020 box set Wildflowers & All the Rest. The song is similar to the title track, in the same vein but with some orchestration.

== Critical reception ==
AllMusic described the song as a lesser-known masterpiece by Tom Petty, and a highlight on the album. It was described as reminiscent of "Go and Say Goodbye" by Buffalo Springfield, although the song also has life's road and challenges as a theme.

== Popularity ==
While the song was not played live very often by Tom Petty (63 times), it became quite popular on streaming services: it is Petty's seventh most streamed solo song on Spotify, surpassing popular singles that were live staples, such as "It's Good to Be King".

== Personnel ==
Personnel taken from Wildflowers CD booklet.

- Tom Petty – vocals, electric guitar
- Mike Campbell – bass, slide guitar
- Steve Ferrone – drums
- Benmont Tench – piano
- Michael Kamen – orchestration, conductor

== Sources ==
- Wawzenek, Bryan (2016). "Tom Petty Albums Ranked Worst to Best". Ultimate Classic Rock.
