= Free Girl Now =

1999 single by Tom Petty and the Heartbreakers

Single by Tom Petty and the Heartbreakers

from the album Echo
- Released: 1999
- Genre: Hard rock
- Length: 3:30
- Label: Warner Bros. Records
- Songwriter: Tom Petty

Tom Petty and the Heartbreakers singles chronology
"Changed the Locks" (1996)	"Free Girl Now" (1999)	"Room at the Top" (1999)

"Free Girl Now" is a song by Tom Petty and the Heartbreakers. It is the third track and the lead single from the band's album Echo. The single reached No. 5 on the Mainstream Rock chart and No. 3 on the Adult Alternative Airplay chart. In Canada, the song peaked at No. 1 on the RPM Rock Report in April 1999. The song later repeaked at No. 1 on the RPM rock chart in May 1999.

== Release ==
"Free Girl Now" is notable for being the second single by a major artist to be made available for free internet download in MP3 format by the artist. Petty's marketing decision caused concern at Warner Bros., and the download was pulled after two days but propagated thanks to services such as Napster.

== Song info and reception ==
AllMusic describes "Free Girl Now" as an "intoxicating hard rock" track with "a layer of sorrow and regret". Return of Rock ranks the song as the 3rd best track on the album, describing it as being "reminiscent of early classic Petty".

== Charts ==
Chart (2010)	Peak position
Canada Rock (Billboard)	6
US Adult Alternative Airplay (Billboard)	3
US Mainstream Rock Airplay (Billboard)	5
