= Swingin' (Tom Petty and the Heartbreakers song) =

Promotional single by Tom Petty and the Heartbreakers

from the album Echo
- B-side: "Swingin' (album version)"
- Released: 1999
- Genre: Folk rock
- Length: 5:30
- Songwriter: Tom Petty

Tom Petty and the Heartbreakers singles chronology
"Room at the Top" (1999)	"Swingin'" (1999)	"The Last DJ" (2002)

"Swingin'" is a song written by Tom Petty and released on the 1999 album Echo by Tom Petty and the Heartbreakers. It was released on a promotional CD single with the edited version of the song as the A-side and the album version as the B-side.

== Song info ==
In 1999, the year of the song's release, Petty explained its genesis in an episode of VH1 Storytellers: "We did a lot of songs for this particular album and there was one song that we thought that we might could make a little better if we went back and had one more go at it. And The Heartbreakers are legendary for not really being big on having one more go at things, because we usually do the best thing we're gonna pretty early on in the program, and the rest of the night just turns into drinking and talking. That's pretty much it. Some people actually can do the song over and over and get better and better, but this is not our case. And so, at this session, let's just say the session wasn't going great because we were not bettering the song that we'd done. And, I tended to wander off into my own little space in my headphones. While they were playing that song, I wrote another song that was really a lot better, and so I said, "You know, while you guys were playing that, I wrote another song and I think it's a lot better." And it turned out that we did actually like the new song a lot better and I want to play it for you now. And the new song is called Swingin." Although on stage Petty played mainly rhythm or acoustic guitar, here he shares the lead with Mike Campbell. He also played harmonica on the album version.

American Songwriter describes the song, analyzing the lyrics as it tells "the story of a girl who takes to the road to escape what we can assume is a dead-end life at home. She trusts her fate to the whims of chance and the kindness of strangers. All along, she embodies the resilience that characterizes many of the other folks who populate Petty's songs. This girl isn't settling for small victories once she makes up her mind to go. "Gonna hitchhike to the yellow moon," is her intent. While some might see the guy in the Cadillac as a potential problem, she sees opportunity. "Yeah, that’s when it happened," Petty sings. "The world caught fire that day." In the second verse, Petty fills in some of the details. That includes the fact that she’s been incentivized to hit the road because of "trouble with the law." There’s something telling in the fact that she goes to her mother-in-law for help. And she hints at other escapades in the past. "After that night in Vegas / And the hell that we went through." In the final verse, we find out how far she’s made it ("'cross the Georgia line") and that she’s finally found some happiness. "It had to come in time," she sighs. "She said, 'At last I’m free'", Petty sings. !I wish Ma could see me now / She’d be so proud of me." It’s hard to say if it’s sadness or spite coming to the fore at that moment. But we know that she's the author of her own fate, good or bad, and road finally gives this wayward soul the peace and redemption that she craves. It also states "Swingin'" offers us one of the most unforgettable character sketches in the Tom Petty canon. Pretty impressive, considering that character was made up on the spot."

== Release and reception ==
"Swingin'" was a reasonably successful hit, reaching #17 on the Billboard Mainstream Rock chart and #11 on the Adult Alternative Airplay chart, as well as #5 on the Heritage Rock chart.. On Spotify it is the most streamed song on the album Echo. The song was also very well-received by critics on rock magazines. Return of Rock ranked the song as the best on the album Echo. The Bitter Southerner describes "Swingin'" as one of the best later-era songs by Tom Petty, stating "In it he sounds in pain and angry, nearly defeated, yet still defiant." Rolling Stone includes "Swingin'" in the top 10 of Tom Petty's best deep cuts. Classic Rock Review describes the song as "a fine example of Petty’s interpretation of Bob Dylan’s style".

== Charts ==
Chart (1999)	Peak position
US Mainstream Rock Airplay (Billboard)	17
US Adult Alternative Airplay (Billboard)	11
