= A Spanner in the Works =

Studio album by Rod Stewart
- Released: 29 May 1995
- Studios: Woodstock House Co. (Wicker, Ireland); Sarm (London, UK); A&M, Ocean Way Recording, Herschel House, Conway (Hollywood, California); Le Mobile (San Diego, California)
- Length: 57:15
- Label: Warner Bros.
- Producers: Trevor Horn; Rod Stewart; James Newton Howard; Michael Ostin; Lenny Waronker; Bernard Edwards; Andy Taylor

Rod Stewart chronology
Unplugged...and Seated (1993)	A Spanner in the Works (1995)	If We Fall in Love Tonight (1996)

Singles from A Spanner in the Works
- 1. "You're the Star" Released: 8 May 1995; 2. "Leave Virginia Alone" Released: 16 May 1995; 3. "Lady Luck" Released: 7 August 1995; 4. "This" Released: 8 August 1995; 5. "Purple Heather" Released: 3 June 1996

Professional ratings
Review scores
Source	Rating
AllMusic	3/5 stars
Entertainment Weekly	C+
NME	5/10
The Rolling Stone Album Guide	3/5 stars

A Spanner in the Works is the seventeenth studio album released by Rod Stewart on 29 May 1995. It ended a four-year gap since his previous studio album, Vagabond Heart. Although he did release the live album Unplugged...and Seated in 1993, as of 2024, this remains Stewart's longest break between studio albums. It was released on Warner Bros. Records in the United States, the United Kingdom, and Japan. Five singles were released: "You're The Star", "Leave Virginia Alone", "This", "Lady Luck", and "Purple Heather".

== Content ==
The album includes covers of Bob Dylan's "Sweetheart Like You" and The Blue Nile's "The Downtown Lights". The song "Muddy, Sam and Otis" is Stewart's tribute to Muddy Waters, Sam Cooke, and Otis Redding. Track 12, later released as a single featuring the Scottish Euro '96 Football Squad, "Purple Heather" is a folk song that normally goes by the name "Wild Mountain Thyme". It is often credited as traditional, but was written by Francis McPeake. "Leave Virginia Alone" was written by Tom Petty and recorded for his album Wildflowers, but was left off the finished album and given to Stewart instead.

== Track listing ==
No.	Title	Writer(s)	Producer(s)	Length
1.	"Windy Town"	Chris Rea	Trevor Horn	5:12
2.	"The Downtown Lights"	Paul Buchanan	Trevor Horn	6:33
3.	"Leave Virginia Alone"	Tom Petty	James Newton Howard, Michael Ostin, Lenny Waronker	4:07
4.	"Sweetheart Like You"	Bob Dylan	Horn	4:54
5.	"This"	John Capek, Marc Jordan	Horn	5:19
6.	"Lady Luck"	Carmine Rojas, Jeff Golub, Kevin Savigar, Rod Stewart	Horn	4:25
7.	"You're the Star"	Billy Livsey, Frankie Miller, Graham Lyle	Horn, Bernard Edwards	4:39
8.	"Muddy, Sam and Otis"	Stewart, Savigar	Horn	4:42
9.	"Hang On St. Christopher"	Tom Waits	Horn	4:04
10.	"Delicious"	Stewart, Andy Taylor, Robin LeMesurier	Edwards, Andy Taylor	4:43
11.	"Soothe Me"	Sam Cooke	Edwards	3:33
12.	"Purple Heather"	Traditional; arranged by Stewart	Horn	4:58

== Personnel ==
Musicians

- Rod Stewart – lead vocals, backing vocals (5)
- Kevin Savigar – keyboards, bass (5, 8), squeezebox (12)
- Eric Caudieux – programming (1)
- Mike Higham – programming (1, 2, 4, 5, 8, 9), digital manipulation (1, 2, 4, 5, 8, 9), keyboards (2, 8), bass (8)
- Trevor Horn – programming (1, 2, 4, 5, 8, 9), digital manipulation (1, 2, 4, 5, 8, 9), bass (1), backing vocals (1)
- Jamie Muhoberac – keyboards (2), acoustic piano solo (9), percussion (9)
- James Newton Howard – keyboards (3)
- Martin O'Conner – accordion (6)
- Anne Dudley – acoustic piano (8)
- Billy Preston – Hammond organ (11)
- Jeff Golub – guitars (1, 3, 4, 6, 8, 12), electric guitar (9)
- Robin LeMesurier – guitars (1, 6, 7, 10, 11), guitar solo (4)
- Tim Pierce – guitars (1, 2, 5, 8)
- David Lindley – bouzouki (1)
- Don Teschner – mandolin (1, 6), fiddle (6)
- Davey Johnstone – guitars (3), mandolin (3)
- Jim Cregan – guitars (5)
- Dónal Lunny – bouzouki (6, 12)
- Michael Landau – guitars (7)
- Andy Taylor – guitars (7, 10, 11)
- Lol Creme – electric guitar (9)
- Guy Pratt – acoustic guitar (9), bass (9)
- Stephen Lipson – bass (2, 4), guitars (4)
- Leland Sklar – bass (3)
- Carmine Rojas – bass (6, 12)
- Bernard Edwards – bass (7, 10, 11)
- David Palmer – drums (1, 4, 6–8, 10–12)
- Paul Robinson – drums (2, 5)
- Kenny Aronoff – drums (3)
- Frank Ricotti – drums (5)
- Paulinho da Costa – percussion (1)
- Máire Ní Chathasaigh – Irish fiddle (6)
- John McSherry – bagpipes (6)
- Leslie Butler – harmonica (9)
- The Kick Horns – horns (9)
  - Simon Clarke – saxophones
  - Tim Sanders – saxophones
  - Neil Sidwell – trombone
  - Roddy Lorimer – trumpet
- Lenny Pickett – saxophones (11)
- David Woodford – saxophones (11)
- Nick Lane – trombone (11)
- Rick Braun – trumpet (11)
- Gavyn Wright – orchestra leader (1, 2, 4, 5, 8, 12)
- Susie Katayama – orchestra leader (7, 11)
- Aleisha Irving – backing vocals (2)
- Joe Turano – backing vocals (3, 7)
- Joey Diggs – backing vocals (7, 8)
- Lamont Van Hook – backing vocals (7, 8)
- Fred White – backing vocals (7, 8)
- Luana Jackman – choir coordinator (7)
- Bobbi Page – choir coordinator (7)
- Josef Powell – backing vocals (10, 11)
- Oren Waters – backing vocals (10, 11)
- Terry Young – backing vocals (10, 11)
- Glasgow Gaelic Music Association – choir (12)
- Kenneth Thompson – choir leader (12)

Music arrangements

- Anne Dudley – string arrangements and conductor (1, 2, 4, 5, 8, 12)
- Kevin Savigar – string arrangements and conductor (7, 11)
- The Kick Horns – horn arrangements (9)
- Rick Braun – horn arrangements (11)
- Nick Lane – horn arrangements (11)
- Lenny Pickett – horn arrangements (11)
- David Woodford – horn arrangements (11)
- Rod Stewart – arrangements (12)

== Production ==
- Rob Dickins – executive producer
- Michael Ostin – executive producer
- Tim Weidner – recording (1, 2, 5)
- Steve MacMillan – recording (3), mixing
- Charlie Bouis – engineer (4, 6–12)
- Eric Johnston – assistant engineer (4, 6–12)
- Danny Alonso – mix assistant (1, 2)
- Rich Rowe – mix assistant (1, 2, 4, 5, 9, 12)
- Pat Thrasher – mix assistant (6)
- Rail Rogut – mix assistant (7, 8, 10, 11)
- Stephen Marcussen – mastering at Precision Mastering (Hollywood, California)
- Greg Ross – design
- Herb Ritts – photography
- Annie Challis, Randy Phillips and Arnold Stiefel at Stiefel Phillips Entertainment – management

== Charts ==
Chart (1995)	Peak position
Australian Albums (ARIA)	28
Austrian Albums (Ö3 Austria)	13
Belgian Albums (Ultratop Flanders)	22
Belgian Albums (Ultratop Wallonia)	49
Canada Top Albums/CDs (RPM)	2
Dutch Albums (Album Top 100)	23
German Albums (Offizielle Top 100)	9
New Zealand Albums (RMNZ)	13
Norwegian Albums (VG-lista)	6
Swedish Albums (Sverigetopplistan)	2
Swiss Albums (Schweizer Hitparade)	15
UK Albums (Official Charts)	4
US Billboard 200	35

== Certifications ==
Region	Certification	Certified units/sales
Canada (Music Canada)	Platinum	100,000^{^}
New Zealand (RMNZ)	Gold	7,500^{^}
United Kingdom (BPI)	Gold	100,000^{^}
United States (RIAA)	Gold	500,000^{^}
^{^} Shipments figures based on certification alone.
