= Kiss My Amps (Live) =

2011 live album by Tom Petty and the Heartbreakers

Live album by Tom Petty and the Heartbreakers
- Released: November 25, 2011
- Recorded: June 14, 2008 – September 18, 2010
- Genres: Rock; heartland rock; blues rock
- Length: 36:46
- Labels: Reprise; Rhino
- Producers: Tom Petty; Mike Campbell; Ryan Ulyate

Tom Petty and the Heartbreakers chronology
Mojo Tour 2010 (2010)	Kiss My Amps (Live) (2011)	Hypnotic Eye (2014)

Kiss My Amps (Live) is a live album by American rock band Tom Petty and the Heartbreakers. The album was released by Reprise Records on November 25, 2011, as a limited-edition vinyl LP for the 2011 Black Friday Record Store Day. Each track was also released in 2012 on the Mojo Tour Edition Live Disc. (Sweet William's live recording date is incorrect on the vinyl record, as the song was never performed live in 2010. The Tour Edition booklet liner notes of Mojo do however get this date correct.)

== Track listing ==
Side one
No.	Title	Writer(s)	Location	Length
1.	"Takin' My Time" (July 22, 2010)	Tom Petty	The Palace of Auburn Hills, Auburn Hills, Michigan	4:42
2.	"I Should Have Known It" (June 16, 2010)	Petty, Mike Campbell	Rexall Place, Edmonton, Alberta	4:15
3.	"Sweet William" (June 14, 2008)	Petty	Comcast Center, Mansfield, Massachusetts	5:16
4.	"Jefferson Jericho Blues" (August 1, 2010)	Petty, Campbell	Wachovia Arena, Philadelphia	3:36

Side two
No.	Title	Writer(s)	Location	Length
1.	"First Flash of Freedom" (August 1, 2010)	Petty, Campbell	Wachovia Arena, Philadelphia	6:25
2.	"Running Man's Bible" (September 18, 2010)	Petty	Time Warner Cable Music Pavilion, Raleigh, North Carolina	6:10
3.	"Good Enough" (July 31, 2010)	Petty, Campbell	Wachovia Arena, Philadelphia	6:22

== Kiss My Amps, Vol. 2 ==
On April 16, 2016, Tom Petty released a second volume of the Kiss My Amps series. It was printed on limited edition vinyl for 2016's annual Record Store Day.

=== Track listing ===
Kiss My Amps (Live), Vol. 2
No.	Title	Writer(s)	Location	Length
1.	"So You Want to Be a Rock 'n' Roll Star" (May 20, 2013)	Chris Hillman, Jim McGuinn	Beacon Theatre, New York City	3:43
2.	"(I'm Not Your) Steppin' Stone" (May 20, 2013)	Boyce and Hart	Beacon Theatre, New York City	3:28
3.	"Love Is a Long Road" (June 8, 2013)	Petty, Campbell	The Fonda Theatre, Los Angeles	4:39
4.	"Two Gunslingers" (May 25, 2013)	Petty	Beacon Theatre, New York City	3:43
5.	"When a Kid Goes Bad" (June 8, 2013)	Petty	The Fonda Theatre, Los Angeles	5:50
6.	"Willin'" (June 8, 2013)	Lowell George	The Fonda Theatre, Los Angeles	4:54
7.	"The Best of Everything" (June 4, 2013)	Petty	The Fonda Theatre, Los Angeles	4:30
8.	"Tweeter and the Monkey Man" (May 26, 2013)	Traveling Wilburys	Beacon Theatre, New York City	8:49
9.	"Rebels" (June 16, 2013)	Petty	2013 Bonnaroo Music Festival, Manchester	4:24
10.	"A Woman in Love (It's Not Me)" (June 16, 2013)	Petty, Campbell	2013 Bonnaroo Music Festival, Manchester	6:07
