= Mojo (Tom Petty and the Heartbreakers album) =

Studio album by Tom Petty and the Heartbreakers
- Released: June 15, 2010
- Recorded: April 28, 2009 – January 11, 2010
- Studios: The Clubhouse, Los Angeles, California
- Genres: Heartland rock; blues rock; hard rock
- Length: 65:09
- Label: Reprise
- Producers: Tom Petty; Mike Campbell; Ryan Ulyate

Tom Petty and the Heartbreakers chronology
The Live Anthology (2009)	Mojo (2010)	Mojo Tour 2010 (2010)

Singles from Mojo
- 1. "Good Enough" Released: 2010; 2. "I Should Have Known It" Released: 2010; 3. "First Flash of Freedom" Released: 2010; 4. "Don't Pull Me Over" Released: 2010; 5. "Help Me" Released: 2023

Mojo is the twelfth studio album by American rock band Tom Petty and the Heartbreakers, released on June 15, 2010, on CD and June 29 on Blu-ray. It was Petty's first album with the Heartbreakers in eight years. Mojo debuted at No. 2 on the U.S. Billboard 200, selling 125,000 copies in its first week of release. The album was also the band's first full album with bassist Ron Blair since 1981's Hard Promises, as he played on only two tracks on the previous Heartbreakers album, The Last DJ.

The album was reissued in 2023 as the "Extra Mojo Version" on vinyl LP and also digitally with three bonus tracks. The digital edition of the reissued album included an unreleased cover of Sonny Boy Williamson's song "Help Me" which was issued as a single on October 6, 2023.

== Recording ==
In November 2009, Petty told Rolling Stone's David Fricke that he intended to record the album live in the studio without overdubs.

He said of the album's tone, "It's blues-based. Some of the tunes are longer, more jammy kind of music. A couple of tracks really sound like the Allman Brothers – not the songs but the atmosphere of the band."

== Promotion and release ==
The band began streaming the album song "Good Enough" on their website February 24, 2010, followed two days later by "First Flash of Freedom". Videos for "Jefferson Jericho Blues", "First Flash of Freedom", "I Should Have Known It", "Something Good Coming" and "Good Enough" were posted on the band's YouTube channel.

Tom Petty also released five of the songs prior to his and the Heartbreakers' Mojo tour via his YouTube account. The first of these was the single "Good Enough", released March 4, 2010. The songs released were, in order of release:

1. "Good Enough"
2. "First Flash of Freedom"
3. "I Should Have Known It" (official video)
4. "Something Good Coming" (official video)
5. "Jefferson Jericho Blues" (official video)

The last three of the songs were clean, non-overdubbed songs filmed in his new studio, as he expressed in a roughly 12-minute "Mojo Documentary". He noted he had had the studio for "eight or nine years", which dates back approximately to before the recording of his previous studio album with the Heartbreakers, The Last DJ.

In addition to his YouTube account, Mojo's track list was made available June 8, 2010, via an article on one of ESPN's websites. The article went into brief detail of the tour and songs. Most of the songs were made available on the website through a "Streampad" music player, at least until the album was officially released.

Mojo was released via compact disc and limited edition vinyl (2x LP). The vinyl pressing is largely out of print and is considered a collector's item, selling for large sums in the vinyl aftermarket.

== Critical reception ==
Professional ratings
Aggregate scores
Source	Rating
Metacritic	72/100
Review scores
Source	Rating
AllMusic	3/5 stars
The A.V. Club	B−
Chicago Tribune	3/4 stars
Entertainment Weekly	B
The Guardian	2/5 stars
Now	2/5 stars
Paste	8/10
PopMatters	8/10
Rolling Stone	4/5 stars
Slant Magazine	2.5/5 stars

The album has a score of 72 out of 100 from Metacritic based on "generally favorable reviews". ChartAttack gave it a score of 2.5 out of five and said it was "an incredible disappointment" and "a record destined to be a cult hit 10 years from now, recognized as the band's most expansive and sonically adventurous disc. But expectations for Petty and his band are incredibly high, and from a contemporary standpoint, it comes off as lacking memorable hooks and choruses, something we all expect these guys to pull off in their sleep." The Independent, however, gave it all five stars and said "it's one of their very best efforts, as ought to be the case when a band plugs into the potency of raw R'n'B spirit. [...] It's such a perfect alliance of sentiment and setting that Muddy himself might have penned it."

The Globe and Mail gave it three out of four stars and said, "The carefree Petty, at this stage of the game, isn't worried about hits. Like Big Bill Broonzy and others, he's found the key to the highway, and he's billed out and bound to go." Uncut gave it three out of five stars and said, "Unfortunately, and rather ironically, Mojo is ultimately undone by the very virtuosity of its creators: the band stumbles repeatedly into that musician's trap of making music that sounds intended principally to impress other musicians."

== Track listing ==
All tracks are written by Tom Petty, except 2, 7 and 15, co written by Mike Campbell.

Mojo track listing
No.	Title	Length
1.	"Jefferson Jericho Blues"	3:24
2.	"First Flash of Freedom"	6:53
3.	"Running Man's Bible"	6:02
4.	"The Trip to Pirate's Cove"	5:00
5.	"Candy"	4:12
6.	"No Reason to Cry"	3:04
7.	"I Should Have Known It"	3:36
8.	"U.S. 41"	3:01
9.	"Takin' My Time"	4:21
10.	"Let Yourself Go"	3:23
11.	"Don't Pull Me Over"	4:05
12.	"Lover's Touch"	4:24
13.	"High in the Morning"	3:36
14.	"Something Good Coming"	4:11
15.	"Good Enough"	5:57
Total length:		65:09

iTunes bonus track
No.	Title	Length
16.	"Little Girl Blues"	3:08
Total length:		68:17

Extra Mojo Version
No.	Title	Writer(s)	Length
16.	"Help Me"	Ralph Bass, Sonny Boy Williamson, and Willie Dixon	3:30
17.	"Mystery of Love"		4:05
18.	"Little Girl Blues"		3:08
Total length:			75:32

== Personnel ==
Tom Petty and the Heartbreakers

- Tom Petty – vocals, rhythm guitar, lead and bass guitar on "Running Man's Bible", tambourine on "Candy", producer
- Mike Campbell – lead guitar, lap steel on "No Reason to Cry", producer
- Benmont Tench – acoustic and electric piano, organ
- Scott Thurston – rhythm guitar, harmonica
- Ron Blair – bass guitar, upright bass on "U.S. 41"
- Steve Ferrone – drums, percussion

Production

- Chris Bellman – mastering
- Greg Looper – engineer
- Ryan Ulyate – producer, recording, mixer
- Travis Weidel – recording

== Charts ==
=== Weekly charts ===
Weekly chart performance for Mojo
Chart (2010)	Peak position
Australian Albums (ARIA)	52
Austrian Albums (Ö3 Austria)	42
Belgian Albums (Ultratop Flanders)	59
Belgian Albums (Ultratop Wallonia)	47
Canadian Albums (Billboard)	3
Dutch Albums (Album Top 100)	60
French Albums (SNEP)	139
German Albums (Offizielle Top 100)	12
Greek Albums (IFPI)	25
Irish Albums (IRMA)	28
Italian Albums (FIMI)	53
New Zealand Albums (RMNZ)	11
Norwegian Albums (VG-lista)	9
Scottish Albums (Official Charts)	27
Spanish Albums (Promusicae)	40
Swedish Albums (Sverigetopplistan)	3
Swiss Albums (Schweizer Hitparade)	27
UK Albums (Official Charts)	38
US Billboard 200	2
US Top Rock Albums (Billboard)	1

=== Year-end charts ===
Year-end chart performance for Mojo
Chart (2010)	Position
US Billboard 200	99
US Top Rock Albums (Billboard)	25
