= Leave Virginia Alone =

1995 song written by Tom Petty, first performed by Rod Stewart

Single by Rod Stewart

from the album A Spanner in the Works
- Released: 16 May 1995
- Length: 4:07
- Label: Warner Bros.
- Songwriter: Tom Petty
- Producers: James Newton Howard; Michael Ostin; Lenny Waronker

Rod Stewart singles chronology
| "You're the Star" (1995) | "Leave Virginia Alone" (1995) | "Lady Luck" (1995) |

"Leave Virginia Alone" is a song written by American musician Tom Petty and performed by British singer-songwriter Rod Stewart on Stewart's 17th album, A Spanner in the Works (1995). The song was released by Warner Bros. Records and reached number one on the Canadian RPM 100 Hit Tracks and Adult Contemporary charts in 1995. It also reached number 52 on the US Billboard Hot 100 and number 53 in Australia. It was later included on Petty's album Wildflowers and All the Rest (2020).

== Background ==
"Leave Virginia Alone" was originally meant to be on Tom Petty's studio album Wildflowers, but the track did not make the album. In a Billboard interview with Rod Stewart, Stewart revealed that Petty's manager gave him the song when Petty believed the track was too similar to a previous hit of his. "Leave Virginia Alone" was added to Stewart's album A Spanner in the Works after the audio mastering was finished and was the first single for the album.

== Release ==
On 13 May 1995, Stewart debuted "Leave Virginia Alone" on Saturday Night Live's 20th-season finale.

== Reception ==
"Leave Virginia Alone" received positive reviews from critics. Steve Baltin from Cash Box declared it as "a can’t miss" and "a guaranteed smash". He added, "In addition, though, it’s a wonderfully catchy tune that features Stewart’s trademark vocals sounding as strong as they have in years." Matthew Bolin of Popdose said it was a "solid song with a fitting vocal performance". Larry Flick from Billboard magazine complimented the connection between Rod Stewart's voice with the beats and acoustic guitars of the track. All the same, Stewart admitted to Billboard that at first, he did not like the song and had to be convinced to record the track.

== Music video ==
In the accompanying music video for "Leave Virginia Alone", a woman runs away from people wearing costumes after holding a press conference. In an article in the Chicago Tribune, Susan Alexander said "Leave Virginia Alone" fit the music video format of having a "bad girl" who uses emotional manipulation. A few years later in Michigan Sociological Review, Alexander said she believed the woman in the video committed a sinful act, and the lyrics of "Leave Virginia Alone" point towards drug abuse and promiscuity.

== Charts ==
=== Weekly charts ===
| Chart (1995) | Peak position |
|---|---|
| Australia (ARIA) | 53 |
| Canada Top Singles (RPM) | 1 |
| Canada Adult Contemporary (RPM) | 1 |
| Iceland (Íslenski Listinn Topp 40) | 40 |
| US Billboard Hot 100 | 52 |
| US Adult Contemporary (Billboard) | 10 |
| US Pop Airplay (Billboard) | 34 |

=== Year end charts ===
| Chart (1995) | Position |
|---|---|
| Canada Top Singles (RPM) | 20 |
| Canada Adult Contemporary (RPM) | 10 |

== Release history ==
| Region | Date | Format(s) | Label(s) | Ref(s). |
|---|---|---|---|---|
| United States | 16 May 1995 | Contemporary hit radio; CD; cassette | Warner Bros. | |
| Australia | 5 June 1995 | CD; cassette | Warner Bros. | |
| Japan | 25 June 1995 | Mini-CD | Warner Bros. | |

== Tom Petty version ==
"Leave Virginia Alone"

Single by Tom Petty

from the album Wildflowers & All the Rest
- Released: 2020
- Recorded: January 1993
- Studio: Sound City
- Length: 4:15
- Label: Warner Bros.
- Songwriter: Tom Petty
- Producer: Rick Rubin

Tom Petty singles chronology
| "Wildflowers (Home Recording)" (2020) | "Leave Virginia Alone" (2020) |

"Leave Virginia Alone", this time sung by the writer Tom Petty, would later appear on the track list for the posthumous album released by his estate, Wildflowers & All the Rest. The song was released as a single from the album on 1 October 2020.

=== Personnel ===
Personnel taken from Wildflowers & All the Rest liner notes.

- Tom Petty – lead vocal, guitar
- Mike Campbell – guitar, bass guitar
- Benmont Tench – piano, harmonium
- Howie Epstein – harmony vocals
- Steve Ferrone – drums
- Lenny Castro – tambourine

== See also ==
- List of number-one singles of 1995 (Canada)
