= The Last DJ (song) =

Promotional single by Tom Petty and the Heartbreakers

from the album The Last DJ
- Released: September 23, 2002
- Genre: Rock
- Length: 3:31
- Label: Warner Bros.
- Songwriter: Tom Petty
- Producers: George Drakoulias; Tom Petty; Mike Campbell

Tom Petty and the Heartbreakers singles chronology
"Room at the Top" (1999)	"The Last DJ" (2002)	"Good Enough" (2010)

Tom Petty singles chronology
"Swingin'" (1999)	"The Last DJ" (2002)	"Saving Grace" (2006)

"The Last DJ" is a song written by Tom Petty and recorded by American rock band Tom Petty and the Heartbreakers. It was released in September 2002 as the lead promotional single from its eponymous album. The song had moderate success, reaching number 22 on Billboard's Mainstream Rock Tracks list in 2002.

== Background and writing ==
Petty told Mojo magazine that, in the song, "Radio was just a metaphor. ‘The Last DJ’ was really about losing our moral compass, our moral center."

Petty told Jim DeRogatis that the song is a story "about a D.J. in Jacksonville, Florida, who became so frustrated with his inability to play what he wants that he moves to Mexico and gets his freedom back. The song is sung by a narrator who's a fan of this D.J."

== Banning ==
The song was banned by many stations owned by Clear Channel Communications for being "anti-radio." "I was elated when my song was banned," Petty told Billboard. "I remember when the radio meant something. We enjoyed the people who were on it, even if we hated them. They had personalities. They were people of taste, who we trusted. And I see that vanishing."

== Critical reception ==
Billboard's Chuck Taylor called it "the most inspiring song in years from a man who has pretty much seen it all."

== In popular culture ==
In the Simpsons episode "How I Spent My Strummer Vacation", Homer receives songwriting lessons from Tom Petty. In the original airing, "The Last DJ" can be heard playing on a radio in the final scene. The song was changed for syndication.

== Charts ==
Chart (2002)	Peak position
U.S. Billboard Mainstream Rock Tracks	22
