= Somewhere Under Heaven =

1992 song by Tom Petty released in 2015

Single by Tom Petty

from the album Wildflowers & All the Rest
- Released: June 2, 2015
- Recorded: September 30, 1992
- Studio: Rumbo Recorders
- Genre: Rock
- Length: 4:36
- Label: Warner Bros.
- Songwriters: Tom Petty; Mike Campbell
- Producers: Tom Petty; Mike Campbell

Tom Petty singles chronology
"U Get Me High" (2014)	"Somewhere Under Heaven" (2015)	"Keep a Little Soul" (2018)

"Somewhere Under Heaven" is a song recorded by Tom Petty during the Wildflowers studio sessions in 1992. It was released in 2015 as promotion for a multi-disc Wildflowers re-release titled Wildflowers & All the Rest, which was previously shelved and then released in 2020. The song was featured in the film Entourage.

== Background ==
"Somewhere Under Heaven" was written by Tom Petty and guitarist Mike Campbell in 1992 during the recording of Petty's second solo album Wildflowers, however was left off the final release. It was produced by Petty and Campbell, and mixed by the Heartbreakers’ long-time collaborator, Ryan Ulyate.

== Personnel ==
Credits taken from Wildflowers & All the Rest liner notes.

Musicians

- Tom Petty – lead vocal
- Mike Campbell – guitars, organ, bass guitar, drums

Production

- Chris Bellman – mastering
- Mike Campbell – producer
- Tom Petty – producer
- Brian Scheuble – engineer
- Ryan Ulyate – mixer
