= Origins, 1971-1978 =

Anniversary album by Tom Petty & The Heartbreakers

Box set by Tom Petty and the Heartbreakers
- Released: November 6, 2026
- Labels: UM^{e}, Shelter Records, Gone Gator Records
- Producer: Denny Cordell

Tom Petty and the Heartbreakers chronology
Live at the Fillmore 1997 (2022)	Origins, 1971-1978 (2026)

Singles from Origins, 1971-1978
- 1. "Parade of Loons" Released: September 16, 2026

Origins, 1971-1978 is a compilation boxed set and anniversary album by Tom Petty and the Heartbreakers. The set was released on November 6, 2026, by Shelter Records.

The box set compiles No Sleep til L.A., an album of unreleased materials from the band's early years, remastered and remixed versions of Tom Petty and the Heartbreakers and You're Gonna Get It!, the band's first two albums, a live album of the band performing at the Record Plant in Sausalito, CA on April 23, 1977, a rarities disc titled The Cut Out Bin, and video footage of the band's appearance on The Old Grey Whistle Test in 1978.

== Track listing ==
Track listing adapted from Pitchfork.

Track timings adapted from YouTube Music.

LP 1: No Sleep Til L.A.
No.	Title	Length
1.	"Parade of Loons"	3:04
2.	"You're Gonna Learn"	3:21
3.	"Another Lonely Night"	3:59
4.	"I Can't Fight It"	3:01
5.	"Depot Street"	3:28
6.	"Sin City"	3:26
7.	"Wild Eyes"	3:23
8.	"Unheard of Kind of Hero"	2:34
9.	"Up in Mississippi Tonight"	3:20
10.	"Satisfy Yourself"	2:40
11.	"Since You Said You Love Me"	4:54
12.	"Long Way"	4:45

LP 2: Tom Petty and the Heartbreakers (50th Anniversary Edition)
No.	Title	Length
1.	"Rockin' Around (with You)"	2:27
2.	"Breakdown" (Extended Version)	2:55
3.	"Hometown Blues"	2:13
4.	"The Wild One, Forever"	3:02
5.	"Anything That's Rock 'n' Roll"	2:25
6.	"Strangered in the Night"	3:32
7.	"Fooled Again (I Don't Like It)" (Extended Version)	4:08
8.	"Mystery Man"	3:02
9.	"Luna"	3:55
10.	"American Girl" (Extended Version)	4:00

LP 3: You're Gonna Get It! (50th Anniversary Edition)
No.	Title	Length
1.	"When the Time Comes" (Extended Version)	3:00
2.	"You're Gonna Get It" (Extended Version)	3:14
3.	"Hurt"	3:17
4.	"Magnolia"	3:02
5.	"Too Much Ain't Enough" (Extended Version)	3:06
6.	"I Need to Know"	2:24
7.	"Listen to Her Heart"	3:06
8.	"No Second Thoughts"	2:41
9.	"Restless" (Extended Version)	3:35
10.	"Baby's a Rock 'n' Roller" (Extended Version)	3:15

LP 4: Live from the Record Plant 1977
No.	Title	Length
1.	"Pre-Show" (speech)	0:45
2.	"Surrender"	2:47
3.	"Jaguar and Thunderbird"	2:17
4.	"Band Intros" (speech)	0:25
5.	"American Girl"	4:11
6.	"Al Kooper, Denny Cordell Intro" (speech)	0:19
7.	"Fooled Again (I Don't Like It)"	5:16
8.	"Luna"	4:24
9.	"How We Doin' on Tape?" (speech)	0:13
10.	"Listen to Her Heart"	3:13
11.	"I Need to Know"	2:36
12.	"Strangered in the Night"	3:53
13.	"Dog on the Run"	8:18
14.	"(Get Your Kicks On) Route 66"	4:15

LP 5: The Cut Out Bin
No.	Title	Length
1.	"Save Me"	3:12
2.	"Making Some Noise"	3:49
3.	"The Ballad of Harry, Neil & Tillie"	4:02
4.	"Cry to Me"	3:19
5.	"Lost in Your Eyes"	4:59

*On CD releases, the contents of LP 5 are included as bonus tracks on No Sleep Til L.A.

All editions also include a Blu-ray and a DVD of the band's 1978 performance on the BBC's The Old Grey Whistle Test.

== Charts ==
Chart performance for Origins, 1971-1978
Chart (2026)	Peak position
French Physical Albums (SNEP)	179
French Rock & Metal Albums (SNEP)	41
German Albums (Offizielle Top 100)	31
German Rock & Metal Albums (Offizielle Top 100)	14
Scottish Albums (Official Charts)	59
UK Albums Sales (Official Charts)	64
US Top Album Sales (Billboard)	21
