= Wildflowers (Tom Petty song) =

1994 song by Tom Petty

Single by Tom Petty

from the album Wildflowers
- Released: 1994; August 20, 2020 (home recording)
- Recorded: 1994
- Genre: Folk rock; heartland rock
- Length: 3:10
- Label: Warner Bros.
- Songwriter: Tom Petty
- Producer: Rick Rubin

Tom Petty singles chronology
"You Don't Know How It Feels (Home Recording)" (2020)	"Wildflowers" (2020)	"Leave Virginia Alone" (2020)

"Wildflowers" is a song written by Tom Petty and the opening track from the album of the same name. The song became quite popular in concerts, and though it was not initially released as a commercial single until 2020 (Note: On August 20, 2020, a posthumous release of the home recorded demo version of the song was released as a digital single.), it charted at #16 on the Billboard Hot Rock Songs chart, at #11 on the Billboard Rock Digital Song Sales and at #3 on the Billboard Lyric Find. AllMusic describes it as having a simple but effective folk-based chord progression, with a sprightly, almost country-oriented rhythm.

The song has gone on to become one of the most beloved in Petty's catalog. Petty also stated "Wildflowers" was easy to write and compose. It was one of the non-singles which were included on the compilation The Best of Everything (others were "Southern Accents", "Square One", "Angel Dream" and "Dreamville").

On August 20, 2020, a posthumous release of the home recorded demo version of the song was released as a digital single alongside a music video. The video contains never-before-seen footage shot by Martyn Atkins during the recording of "Wildflowers". On the same day, it was officially announced that on October 16, a posthumous album titled Wildflowers & All the Rest would be released. It is a comprehensive re-release of "Wildflowers" including the home version (released as a single in August) along with the album Wildflowers and many unearthed gems and demos/home recordings.

The title of the November 2020 book Somewhere You Feel Free: Tom Petty and Los Angeles comes from a lyric in the song.

"Wildflowers" is also Tom Petty's fourth most streamed solo song (and seventh overall) on Spotify, even surpassing the same album's big hit "You Don't Know How it Feels".

== Composition ==
Petty described writing "Wildflowers":

I just took a deep breath and it came out. The whole song. Stream of consciousness: words, music, chords. Finished it. I mean, I just played it into a tape recorder and I played the whole song and I never played it again. I actually only spent three and a half minutes on that whole song. So I’d come back for days playing that tape, thinking there must be something wrong here because this just came too easy. And then I realized that there’s probably nothing wrong at all.

== Personnel ==
Personnel taken from Wildflowers CD booklet.

- Tom Petty – vocals, acoustic guitar
- Mike Campbell – bass, harpsichord
- Steve Ferrone – drums
- Lenny Castro – percussion
- Benmont Tench – harmonium, piano
- Michael Kamen – orchestration, conductor
- George Drakoulias – "must have played something"

== Certification ==
Region	Certification	Certified units/sales
New Zealand (RMNZ)	Platinum	30,000^{‡}
^{‡} Sales+streaming figures based on certification alone.
