= Room at the Top (Tom Petty and the Heartbreakers song) =

Single by Tom Petty and the Heartbreakers

from the album Echo
- B-side: "Sweet William"
- Released: 1999
- Genre: Rock
- Length: 5:01
- Songwriter: Tom Petty

Tom Petty and the Heartbreakers singles chronology
"Free Girl Now" (1999)	"Room at the Top" (1999)	"Swingin'" (1999)

"Room at the Top" is the first track on the album Echo by Tom Petty and the Heartbreakers, and the second single from the album. It reached number 19 on the Billboard Mainstream Rock chart. The B-side, "Sweet William," is a non-album track, but a 2008 live recording was included on Kiss My Amps.

The song is about escapism and the end of Petty's first marriage. Petty described it as one of the most depressing songs in rock history, and so intensely personal for him that once the Echo tour was over, he refused to play it.

"Room at the Top" was nominated for Best Rock Song at the 42nd Annual Grammy Awards.

== Cover versions ==
Eddie Vedder performed "Room at the Top" during the "In Memoriam" segment at the 90th Academy Awards that took place six months after Petty's death. He later recorded the studio version for the soundtrack to the TV show Bad Monkey.

Jason Isbell released a cover of the song on his 2024 live album Live at the Ryman Vol. 2. He had previously played the song live during a residence at the Ryman Auditorium.

== Charts ==
Chart (1999)	Peak position
US Mainstream Rock Airplay (Billboard)	19
US Adult Alternative Airplay (Billboard)	1
