= Echo (Tom Petty and the Heartbreakers album) =

Studio album by Tom Petty and the Heartbreakers
- Released: April 13, 1999
- Genre: Heartland rock
- Length: 62:06
- Label: Warner Bros.
- Producers: Tom Petty; Mike Campbell; Rick Rubin

Tom Petty and the Heartbreakers chronology
Songs and Music from "She's the One" (1996)	Echo (1999)	Anthology: Through the Years (2000)

Singles from Echo
- 1. "Free Girl Now" Released: 1999; 2. "Room at the Top" Released: 1999; 3. "Swingin'" Released: 1999 (promo)

Echo is the tenth studio album by Tom Petty and the Heartbreakers. Released in April 1999, the album reached number 10 on the Billboard 200 aided by the singles "Free Girl Now", "Swingin'" and "Room at the Top", which hit numbers 5, 17 and 19 respectively on Billboard's Mainstream Rock Tracks in 1999. The album was the band's last collaboration with producer Rick Rubin, and was also the last to feature contributions from longtime bassist/vocalist Howie Epstein, who died of a heroin overdose in 2003. Despite still being a member of the band, Epstein is missing from the album's cover photo because he failed to show up for the photo shoot, and Petty ordered it to commence without him. It also marks the first to feature longtime touring member Scott Thurston, as well as the first to credit drummer Steve Ferrone as an official member. Echo was certified Gold (500,000 copies sold) by the RIAA in July 1999, only three months after it was released. Echo is the only Heartbreakers' album to feature a lead vocal from another member of the band, namely lead guitarist Mike Campbell on "I Don't Wanna Fight".

== Reception ==
The album received generally positive reviews, receiving positive critical acclaim for its strong melodies and emotionally captivating writing style. Many have considered this album to be one of Tom Petty's best works, often regarded as more unique and introspective compared to his other projects.

Professional ratings
Review scores
Source	Rating
AllMusic	4/5 stars
The Encyclopedia of Popular Music	3/5 stars
Entertainment Weekly	A−
The Essential Rock Discography	5/10
The Harvard Crimson	(favorable)
The Music Box	4/5 stars
Rolling Stone	3.5/4 stars
USA Today	3/4 stars

== Track listing ==
All tracks are written by Tom Petty, except "I Don't Wanna Fight", written by Mike Campbell.

Echo track listing
No.	Title	Length
1.	"Room at the Top"	5:00
2.	"Counting on You"	4:05
3.	"Free Girl Now"	3:30
4.	"Lonesome Sundown"	4:32
5.	"Swingin'"	5:30
6.	"Accused of Love"	2:45
7.	"Echo"	6:36
8.	"Won't Last Long"	4:22
9.	"Billy the Kid"	4:08
10.	"I Don't Wanna Fight"	2:47
11.	"This One's for Me"	2:42
12.	"No More"	3:15
13.	"About to Give Out"	3:12
14.	"Rhino Skin"	3:57
15.	"One More Day, One More Night"	5:37

== Outtakes ==
- "Sweet William" appeared as the B-side on the "Room at the Top" CD single.
- "Gainesville" and "I Don't Belong" were released posthumously as a part of the An American Treasure compilation in 2018, the latter having been circulated as a bootleg since at least 2008.

== Personnel ==
Tom Petty & the Heartbreakers

- Tom Petty – rhythm guitars, harmonica, lead and backing vocals
- Mike Campbell – guitars (lead, bass), lead vocals on "I Don't Wanna Fight"
- Benmont Tench – piano, electric piano, organ, Chamberlin, clavinet
- Howie Epstein – bass guitar, harmony and backing vocals

Additional musicians

- Scott Thurston – guitars (acoustic, electric), backing vocals
- Steve Ferrone – drums
- Lenny Castro – percussion

Production

- Martyn Atkins – art direction and photography
- Rob Brill – engineer
- Mike Campbell – producer
- Christine Cano – art direction and design
- Richard Dodd – engineer, mixer
- Ok Hee Kim – engineer
- Aaron Lepley – engineer
- Stephen Marcussen – mastering
- Tom Petty – producer
- Rick Rubin – producer
- Dave Schiffman – engineer
- Christine Sirois – engineer

== Charts ==
=== Weekly charts ===
Weekly chart performance for Echo
Chart (1999)	Peak position
Austrian Albums (Ö3 Austria)	27
German Albums (Offizielle Top 100)	5
New Zealand Albums (RMNZ)	43
Swedish Albums (Sverigetopplistan)	5
Swiss Albums (Schweizer Hitparade)	39
UK Albums (OCC)	43
US Billboard 200	10

=== Year-end charts ===
Annual chart performance for Echo
Chart (1999)	Position
US Billboard 200	180

=== Singles ===
Chart performance for singles from Echo
Year	Single	Chart	Position
1999	"Free Girl Now"	US Mainstream Rock	5

== Certifications ==
Certifications for Echo
Region	Certification	Certified units/sales
United States (RIAA)	Gold	500,000^{^}
^{^} Shipments figures based on certification alone.
