= You Wreck Me =

1995 single by Tom Petty

Single by Tom Petty

from the album Wildflowers
- B-side: "Cabin Down Below"; "Only a Broken Heart"
- Released: February 6, 1995
- Genre: Rock; power pop
- Length: 3:22
- Label: Warner Bros.
- Songwriters: Tom Petty; Mike Campbell
- Producer: Rick Rubin

Tom Petty singles chronology
"You Don't Know How It Feels" (1994)	"You Wreck Me" (1995)	"It's Good to Be King" (1995)

"You Wreck Me" is a song by American musician Tom Petty, the fourth track on his second solo studio album, Wildflowers (1994). The song was released in February 1995 by Warner Bros. Records as the second single from the album and became a concert staple. While the song did not chart on the US Billboard Hot 100, it did peak at number two on the Album Rock Tracks chart.

== History ==
The music for this song was written by Petty's longtime partner and guitarist Mike Campbell. Petty originally wrote some words to the song and called it "You Rock Me". Campbell thought the title was a little ordinary and very cliché, but the song sounded fine and they recorded it. Eventually, Petty came back and decided to change the title to "You Wreck Me", and the new title changed the whole meaning of the song.

== Live performances ==
Tom Petty and the Heartbreakers performed the song on 494 different occasions, including their last show at the Hollywood Bowl in Los Angeles in 2017. It was a regular song during every tour after 1995, as well as at the Fillmore residencies in 1997 and 1999. The song was first performed in concert in 1995 at the Louisville Gardens in Kentucky. It was commonly played as an encore.

== Track listing ==
The song was released on a maxi CD single and a cassette single. The cassette and CD versions both include alternate versions of two other tracks from Wildflowers: "Only a Broken Heart" and "Cabin Down Below".

1. "You Wreck Me" – 3:22
2. "Cabin Down Below" – 2:45
3. "Only a Broken Heart" – 4:41

== Personnel ==
Personnel are taken from the Wildflowers CD booklet.

- Tom Petty – lead vocals, electric guitar
- Mike Campbell – electric guitar
- Steve Ferrone – drums
- Howie Epstein – bass, harmony vocals
- Phil Jones – percussion
- Benmont Tench – piano, organ

== Charts ==
=== Weekly charts ===
Weekly chart performance for "You Wreck Me"
Chart (1995)	Peak position
Australia (ARIA)	72
Europe (European Hit Radio)	29
Iceland (Íslenski Listinn Topp 40)	37
UK Singles (Official Charts)	88
US Mainstream Rock Airplay (Billboard)	2

=== Weekly charts ===
Year-end charts for "You Wreck Me"
Chart (1995)	Position
US Album Rock Tracks (Billboard)	6

== Release history ==
Release dates and formats for "You Wreck Me"
Region	Date	Format(s)	Label(s)	Ref.
United Kingdom	February 6, 1995	CD; cassette	Warner Bros.	
Australia	March 3, 1995	CD; cassette	Warner Bros.	

== Covers ==
The War on Drugs covered the song in 2024 for the soundtrack of Bad Monkey.
