= Songs and Music from "She's the One" =

Soundtrack album / studio album by Tom Petty and the Heartbreakers
- Released: August 6, 1996
- Recorded: 1992–1996
- Studios: Sound City, Village Recorders and Andora Studios
- Genre: Rock
- Length: 51:57
- Label: Warner Bros.
- Producers: Rick Rubin; Tom Petty; Mike Campbell

Tom Petty and the Heartbreakers chronology
Playback (1995)	Songs and Music from "She's the One" (1996)	Echo (1999)

Singles from Songs and Music from "She's the One"
- 1. "Walls (Circus)" Released: July 29, 1996

Alternative cover
- Cover art for 2021 reissue as Angel Dream.

Songs and Music from the Motion Picture "She's the One" is the ninth studio album by American rock band Tom Petty and the Heartbreakers, first released in August 1996. The album served as the soundtrack for the 1996 film She's the One, written and directed by Edward Burns. The album was reissued in 2021 as Angel Dream.

Songs and Music from the Motion Picture "She's the One" peaked at number 15 on the Billboard 200 albums chart and was certified gold by the RIAA in December 1996. The track "Walls (Circus)" peaked at number 69 on the Billboard Hot 100 and number 6 on the Mainstream Rock Tracks chart. "Climb That Hill" also peaked at number 6 on the Mainstream Rock Tracks chart, while "Change the Locks" peaked at number 20.

The album was not mentioned on the four-hour documentary Runnin' Down a Dream, though Petty could be seen doing a studio session of the song "Angel Dream (No. 4)".

Some songs were originally recorded for Wildflowers and were put on this album after it was decided to make Wildflowers a single album instead of a double album. She's the One is the only Tom Petty and the Heartbreakers album not to feature an official drummer, as they had not yet found a permanent drummer following the departure of Stan Lynch. Two of the tracks on this album feature Steve Ferrone on drums; Ferrone, who also played drums on nearly all tracks of the Wildflowers record, became the official Heartbreakers drummer shortly after this album was recorded. Curt Bisquera plays drums on most of the tracks on She's the One, while Ringo Starr was the drummer on "Hung Up and Overdue".

"Walls (No. 3)" was also featured in the Tom Hanks comedy Larry Crowne.

== Release history ==
In April 2015, when Petty's back catalog was released in high-resolution audio, this was one of only two albums not included in the series (the other being Wildflowers).

=== Angel Dream ===
In early 2021 it was announced that a Record Store Day release of this album would completely rework it, resulting in it being renamed to Angel Dream. This version of the album takes off the tracks that were from the Wildflowers sessions (the ones added to the Wildflowers and All the Rest deluxe album) and replaces them with previously unreleased bonus tracks. These tracks include "105 Degrees" and "One of Life's Little Mysteries", both written by Petty, as well as a cover of J. J. Cale's "Thirteen Days" and the instrumental "French Disconnection".

Professional ratings
Review scores
Source	Rating
AllMusic	3.5/5 stars
Blender	1/5 stars
The Encyclopedia of Popular Music	3/5 stars
Entertainment Weekly	A−
The Essential Rock Discography	5/10
The Music Box	4/5 stars
Q	4/5 stars
Rolling Stone	4/5 stars

== Track listing ==
All tracks are written by Tom Petty, except where noted.

No.	Title	Writer(s)	Length
1.	"Walls (Circus)"		4:25
2.	"Grew Up Fast"		5:09
3.	"Zero from Outer Space"		3:08
4.	"Climb That Hill"	Petty, Mike Campbell	3:57
5.	"Change the Locks"	Lucinda Williams	4:56
6.	"Angel Dream (No. 4)"		2:27
7.	"Hope You Never"		3:02
8.	"Asshole"	Beck Hansen	3:11
9.	"Supernatural Radio"		5:22
10.	"California"		2:39
11.	"Hope on Board"		1:18
12.	"Walls (No. 3)"		3:03
13.	"Angel Dream (No. 2)"		2:27
14.	"Hung Up and Overdue"		5:48
15.	"Airport"		0:57
Total length:			51:57

=== Angel Dream ===
Angel Dream was released in 2021 to mark the twenty-fifth anniversary of the original album and included the addition of four outtakes ("One of Life's Little Mysteries", J.J. Cale's "Thirteen Days", "105 Degrees", and the instrumental "French Disconnection"), while eliminating "Angel Dream (No. 4)", "Hope on Board", "Airport", "Walls (Circus)" and a number of tracks that originated at the Wildflowers sessions, "Hope You Never", "California", and "Hung Up and Overdue". These tracks were instead featured on the third disc of Wildflowers and All the Rest.

All tracks are written by Tom Petty, except where noted.

Angel Dream
No.	Title	Writer(s)	Length
1.	"Angel Dream (No. 2)"		2:28
2.	"Grew Up Fast"		5:09
3.	"Change the Locks"	Williams	4:54
4.	"Zero from Outer Space"		3:05
5.	"Asshole"	Hansen	3:11
6.	"One of Life's Little Mysteries"		3:10
7.	"Walls (No. 3)"		3:01
8.	"Thirteen Days"	J. J. Cale	3:36
9.	"105 Degrees"		3:11
10.	"Climb That Hill"	Petty, Campbell	3:55
11.	"Supernatural Radio" (extended version)		6:03
12.	"French Disconnection"		2:19
Total length:			44:02

== Personnel ==
Tom Petty & the Heartbreakers

- Tom Petty – vocals, guitars, harmonica, piano, harpsichord, tympani
- Mike Campbell – guitars, piano, Marxophone
- Benmont Tench – organ, piano
- Howie Epstein – bass, background vocals

Additional musicians

- Curt Bisquera – drums except on "Hung Up and Overdue", "Hope You Never", "California", "Angel Dream (No. 2)", "One of Life's Little Mysteries", "Thirteen Days", "105 Degrees", and "French Disconnection"
- Lindsey Buckingham – background vocals on "Walls (Circus)", "Climb That Hill", and "Asshole"
- Steve Ferrone – drums on "Hope You Never" and "California"
- Lili Haydn – violin
- Michael Severens – cello
- Gerri Sutyak – cello
- Chris Trujillo – percussion
- Ringo Starr – drums on "Hung Up and Overdue"
- Carl Wilson – harmony vocals on "Hung Up and Overdue"
- Stan Lynch – drums on "One of Life's Little Mysteries", "Thirteen Days", and "105 Degrees"

Production

- Mike Campbell – producer
- George Drakoulias – A&R
- Greg Fidelman – assistant engineer
- Stephen Marcussen – mastering
- Sylvia Massy – engineer
- Tom Petty – producer
- Rick Rubin – producer
- Jim Scott – engineer, mixer
- Rich Veltrop – assistant engineer
- Tom Winslow – assistant engineer

== Charts ==
=== Weekly charts ===
Weekly chart performance for She's the One
Chart (1996)	Peak position
Austrian Albums (Ö3 Austria)	27
Finnish Albums (Suomen virallinen lista)	21
German Albums (Offizielle Top 100)	20
Norwegian Albums (VG-lista)	22
Scottish Albums (Official Charts)	53
Swedish Albums (Sverigetopplistan)	5
Swiss Albums (Schweizer Hitparade)	27
UK Albums (Official Charts)	37
US Billboard 200	15

Weekly chart performance for Angel Dream
Chart (2021)	Peak position
Belgian Albums (Ultratop Wallonia)	140
German Albums (Offizielle Top 100)	80
Hungarian Albums (MAHASZ)	30
Swiss Albums (Schweizer Hitparade)	31

=== Year-end charts ===
Annual chart performance for Songs and Music from "She's the One"
Chart (1996)	Position
US Billboard 200	200

=== Singles ===
Chart performance for singles from Songs and Music from "She's the One"
Year	Single	Chart	Position
1996	"Walls (Circus)"	US Billboard Hot 100	69
1996	"Walls (Circus)"	US Mainstream Rock Chart	6
1996	"Climb That Hill"	US Mainstream Rock Chart	6
1997	"Change the Locks"	US Mainstream Rock Chart	20

== Certifications ==
Certifications for Songs and Music from "She's the One"
Region	Certification	Certified units/sales
United States (RIAA)	Gold	500,000^{^}
^{^} Shipments figures based on certification alone.
