= It's Good to Be King (song) =

1995 song by Tom Petty

Single by Tom Petty

from the album Wildflowers
- B-side: "Cabin Down Below" (Acoustic Version)
- Released: April 1995
- Genre: Blues rock; folk rock
- Length: 5:10
- Label: Warner Bros.
- Songwriter: Tom Petty
- Producer: Rick Rubin

Tom Petty singles chronology
"You Wreck Me" (1995)	"It's Good to Be King" (1995)	"Walls (Circus)" (1996)

"It's Good to Be King" is a song by American rock singer-songwriter Tom Petty, released as the third single from his 1994 album Wildflowers in April 1995. It peaked at No. 68 on the Billboard Hot 100, and No. 6 on the Billboard Mainstream Rock chart.

== Reviews ==
On AllMusic, reviewer Matthew Greenwald wrote about the song, "One if [sic] the most self-effacing and personal songs to reach the Top Ten charts in the 1990s, "It's Good to Be King" deals with the phenomenon of rock & roll stardom." He described the song's melody as "elegant and folk-rock-ish", and "buttressed" by a Michael Kamen string arrangement that he described as "absolutely stunning". On release, Billboard said the song "builds from a familiar, laid-back base into a coyly Beatles-esque, string-paved chorus that is thickly layered without being excessive."

== Personnel ==
- Tom Petty – lead & harmony vocals, electric guitar
- Mike Campbell – electric & bass guitar
- Benmont Tench – piano
- Howie Epstein – harmony vocals
- Steve Ferrone – drums

Additional musicians

- Lenny Castro – percussion
- Michael Kamen – orchestration, conductor
