= You Don't Know How It Feels =

1994 single by Tom Petty

Single by Tom Petty

from the album Wildflowers
- B-side: "Girl on LSD"
- Released: November 7, 1994
- Genre: Roots rock; country rock; folk rock; stoner rock; heartland rock
- Length: 4:49
- Label: Warner Bros.
- Songwriter: Tom Petty
- Producers: Tom Petty; Rick Rubin; Mike Campbell

Tom Petty singles chronology
"American Girl" (1994)	"You Don't Know How It Feels" (1994)	"You Wreck Me" (1995)
"For Real" (2019)	"You Don't Know How It Feels (Home Recording)" (2020)	"Wildflowers" (2020)

Music video
- "You Don't Know How It Feels" on YouTube

Lyric video
- "You Don't Know How It Feels (Home Recording)" on YouTube

"You Don't Know How It Feels" is a song and the lead single from American musician Tom Petty's 1994 album Wildflowers. The track features candid lyrics describing the songwriter's desire for personal and professional autonomy. The single reached No. 1 on the US Billboard Album Rock Tracks chart, No. 3 on the Canadian RPM 100 Hit Tracks chart, and No. 13 on the Billboard Hot 100, becoming Petty's last top-40 hit in the US. An alternate version was posthumously released on June 26, 2020.

Due to the song’s reference to marijuana, several outlets including MTV, VH1, and many radio stations aired a censored version, taking the word "roll" out of "let's roll another joint", or a version that played the word "joint" backwards. A version replacing the word "roll" with "hit" was also made.

The music video won the MTV Video Music Award for Best Male Video in 1995. At the 38th Annual Grammy Awards in 1996, the song won the award for Best Male Rock Vocal Performance.

== "Girl on LSD" ==
Petty originally intended the B-side of the single, "Girl on LSD", to appear on Wildflowers, but Warner Bros. refused because it was too controversial. In the song Petty sings about being in love with multiple girls on different drugs: marijuana, cocaine, LSD, beer, crystal meth, china white (a slang term for heroin) and coffee and being a drug dealer. In the chorus Petty states: "Through ecstasy, crystal meth and glue / I found no drug compares to you / All these pills, all this weed / I dunno just what I need."

== Track listing ==
- "You Don't Know How It Feels"
- "House in the Woods"
- "Girl on LSD"
- "Mary Jane's Last Dance"
- "Something in the Air"

== Personnel ==
Personnel are taken from the Wildflowers CD booklet.

- Tom Petty – lead and harmony vocals, acoustic guitar, electric guitar (first solo), harmonica, bass guitar
- Mike Campbell – electric guitar (second solo)
- Steve Ferrone – drums
- Howie Epstein – harmony vocals
- Lenny Castro – percussion
- Benmont Tench – grand piano, electric piano

== Charts ==
=== Weekly charts ===
Chart (1994–1995)	Peak position
Australia (ARIA)	98
Canada Top Singles (RPM)	3
UK Singles (Official Charts)	91
US Billboard Hot 100	13
US Adult Contemporary (Billboard)	22
US Mainstream Rock Airplay (Billboard)	1
US Pop Airplay (Billboard)	8

=== Year-end charts ===
Chart (1994)	Position
Canada Top Singles (RPM)	95

Chart (1995)	Position
Canada Top Singles (RPM)	23
US Billboard Hot 100	61
US Album Rock Tracks (Billboard)	23
US Top 40/Mainstream (Billboard)	37

== Certification ==
Region	Certification	Certified units/sales
New Zealand (RMNZ)	Gold	15,000^{‡}
^{‡} Sales+streaming figures based on certification alone.

== Release history ==
Region	Date	Format(s)	Label(s)	Ref.
United Kingdom	November 7, 1994	CD; cassette	Warner Bros.	
Australia	November 28, 1994	CD; cassette	Warner Bros.	
