= I Should Have Known It =

Single by Tom Petty and the Heartbreakers

from the album Mojo
- Released: 2010
- Recorded: The Clubhouse, Los Angeles
- Genre: Hard rock; blues rock
- Length: 3:38
- Songwriter(s): Tom Petty; Mike Campbell
- Producer(s): Tom Petty; Mike Campbell; Ryan Ulyate

Tom Petty and the Heartbreakers singles chronology
"Good Enough" (2010)	"I Should Have Known It" (2010)	"American Dream Plan B" (2014)

"I Should Have Known It" is a song by Tom Petty and the Heartbreakers from their 2010 album Mojo. It was included on Petty's 2019 posthumous greatest hits album The Best of Everything. The song has been described as a great rocker with a riff in Led Zeppelin's style.

== Recording ==
Tom Petty and Mike Campbell recorded I Should Have Known It on January 7, 2010 at The Clubhouse in Los Angeles. This song was presumably written about a girlfriend of Tom's where the relationship was on the rocks. Petty's long-time lead guitarist Mike Campbell told Jam! Music that the blues-based album where the single was included was inspired by the sound of his recently acquired sunburst '59 Les Paul. "I got a new guitar which is actually an old guitar," he said. "It's the classic Jimmy Page, Peter Green, Eric Clapton-era guitar. There were only 500 or 600 of them made that year. There's just something about the harmonic overtones in it when I picked it up and plugged it in, it immediately had that classic British blues sound. He recorded "I Should Have Known It" using a 1959 Les Paul Sunburst, with a backing rhythm by Scott Thurston who recorded with an Epiphone Sheraton. Ron Blair, bassist for the Heartbreakers recorded this song with a 1959 Precision Bass and Benmont Tench recorded the song using a Steinway Grand Piano.

== Personnel ==
Personnel taken from Mojo liner notes.

- Tom Petty – vocals
- Mike Campbell – lead guitar
- Benmont Tench – piano
- Scott Thurston – rhythm guitar
- Ron Blair – bass guitar
- Steve Ferrone – drums

== Charts ==
Chart (2010)	Peak position
Canada Rock (Billboard)	6
US Hot Rock & Alternative Songs (Billboard)	41
US Mainstream Rock (Billboard)	40

== In concert ==
"I Should Have Known It" became the most enduring live song among Petty's more recent material. Petty kept playing it until his death in 2017. It has been played live 188 times.
