= Wildflowers (Tom Petty album) =

Studio album by Tom Petty
- Released: November 1, 1994
- Recorded: July 20, 1992 – April 29, 1994
- Studios: Sound City, Van Nuys; Ocean Way, Hollywood
- Genres: Heartland rock; folk rock; blues rock
- Length: 62:48
- Label: Warner Bros.
- Producers: Rick Rubin; Tom Petty; Mike Campbell

Tom Petty chronology
Greatest Hits (1993)	Wildflowers (1994)	Playback (1995)

Singles from Wildflowers
- 1. "You Don't Know How It Feels" Released: November 7, 1994; 2. "You Wreck Me" Released: February 6, 1995; 3. "It's Good to Be King" Released: April 1995; 4. "A Higher Place" Released: July 1995

Singles from Wildflowers & All the Rest
- 1. "There Goes Angela (Dream Away)" Released: August 20, 2020; 2. "Confusion Wheel" Released: September 10, 2020; 3. "Leave Virginia Alone" Released: October 1, 2020; 4. "Something Could Happen" Released: December 8, 2020

Wildflowers is the second solo studio album by American musician Tom Petty, released on November 1, 1994, by Warner Bros. Records. It was the first album released by Petty after signing a contract with Warner Bros., where he had recorded as part of the Traveling Wilburys. It was the first of three of his albums produced with Rick Rubin. Wildflowers was very well received by critics upon release and was certified 3× platinum in the United States by the Recording Industry Association of America (RIAA). In 2020, Wildflowers was ranked at number 214 on Rolling Stone's list of the "500 Greatest Albums of All Time".

== Production ==
Wildflowers was credited only to Petty and not to his usual band, Tom Petty and the Heartbreakers because, in Petty's words, "Rick [Rubin] and I both wanted more freedom than to be strapped into five guys." Nonetheless, the Heartbreakers are featured heavily with the exception of drummer Stan Lynch. Petty auditioned numerous drummers for the album, and eventually chose Steve Ferrone. Petty fired Lynch from the Heartbreakers just before the album's release, and Ferrone officially joined the touring band the following year, and later became a full band member. (Lynch did play on one outtake from Wildflowers, "Something Could Happen").

Petty wrote and recorded numerous songs for the album, and the original plan was to have Wildflowers be a double album, with 25 songs in total. However, Lenny Waronker of Warner Bros. Records felt that the album was too long, and it was decided to reduce the album to 15 tracks. Of the 10 tracks left out, one, "Leave Virginia Alone", notably became a hit single the following year when it was recorded by Rod Stewart, while another four were included, in modified form, in Tom Petty and the Heartbreakers' next album, the soundtrack album to the 1996 film She's the One. All ten songs, in their original form, were later released in the 2020 edition of Wildflowers, Wildflowers & All the Rest.

=== Outtakes ===
- "Girl on LSD" was released as the B-side of the "You Don't Know How It Feels" single (1994).
- "Leave Virginia Alone" was another song written and recorded during the sessions and left off the finished album. It was given to Rod Stewart for his album A Spanner in the Works (1995).
- The songs "California", "Hope You Never", "Hung Up and Overdue", and "Climb That Hill" were all included on the She's the One soundtrack album (1996), with various edits across the first three tracks, while "Climb That Hill" was a complete remake.
- In 2018, outtake "Lonesome Dave," recorded July 23, 1993, was released on Petty's posthumous box set An American Treasure.
- In 2021, a cover of J.J. Cale's "Thirteen Days," recorded July 22, 1993, was released on the reimagined version of She's the One soundtrack album, Angel Dream.

== Release and reception ==
Professional ratings
Review scores
Source	Rating
AllMusic	4.5/5 stars
Chicago Tribune	3.5/4 stars
Christgau's Consumer Guide	B−
Entertainment Weekly	B−
The Guardian	3/4 stars
Los Angeles Times	3/4 stars
NME	8/10
Pitchfork	8.8/10
Rolling Stone	4/5 stars
USA Today	3.5/4 stars

Reviewing Wildflowers for USA Today, Edna Gundersen wrote that, in contrast to the "adolescent fantasies" of fellow rockers such as Aerosmith and the Rolling Stones, Petty explored "middle-age reality" on an effective album of "sweet-and-sour heartland rock". Elysa Gardner of Rolling Stone stated that Wildflowers "is not as sonically adventurous ... or as instantly accessible" as previous Petty albums such as Southern Accents (1985) and Full Moon Fever (1989), but its "resolute passion and maturity grow more evident with each listen until the album acquires a haunting, enduring resonance." The Guardian's Caroline Sullivan remarked that "misery suits Petty, and Wildflowers contains some of the best work of his career", while Emma Forrest commented in NME that "an album that helps you sort your thoughts without interrupting them is just as significant as any furious paean to disgruntled youth." In the Chicago Tribune, Greg Kot said that Wildflowers, with its "subtle and painterly" sound, showed Petty moving further into musical "ambiguity", "and the music seems newly freed, however subdued it may seem at first."

Although finding it inconsistent, Los Angeles Times journalist Chris Willman observed that Wildflowers "has such an interesting, subtle kind of resonance you may not bemoan the lack of instant anthems." David Browne, however, opined in Entertainment Weekly that Petty had failed to progress musically or lyrically, and music critic Robert Christgau felt that Petty sounded "wilted" and "torpid".

Four singles were released from the album between 1994 and 1995, the most successful of which, "You Don't Know How It Feels", reached No. 13 on the Billboard Hot 100 and topped the Album Rock Tracks chart for one week. It was followed by "You Wreck Me", "It's Good to Be King" and "A Higher Place" which reached Nos. 2, 6, and 12 respectively on the Mainstream Rock chart. The title track, while not released as a single, charted at No. 16 on the Billboard Hot Rock Songs chart and at No. 3 on the Billboard Lyric Find. and became one of Petty's most streamed and popular songs.

In a retrospective review, AllMusic's Stephen Thomas Erlewine found that Wildflowers is distinguished within Petty's discography by "its casual gait" and extended length, allowing it to capture "the full range of Tom Petty as a singer, songwriter, and rocker." Pitchfork writer Sam Sodomsky said that it was Petty's best solo album, characterized by its "elegantly spare, personal, and intuitive" songs. Rolling Stone listed Wildflowers as the twelfth-best album of the 1990s, and later ranked the record at number 214 on its 2020 list of the "500 Greatest Albums of All Time". Guitar World placed the album at number 49 in their "Superunknown: 50 Iconic Albums That Defined 1994" list.

In April 2015, when Petty's back catalog was released in high-resolution audio, this was one of only two albums not included in the series (Songs and Music from "She's the One" was the other one), but a hi-res version was available on Pono Music.

The title of the 2020 book Somewhere You Feel Free: Tom Petty and Los Angeles comes from a lyric in the album's title song "Wildflowers".

== Wildflowers & All the Rest ==
Petty's family and bandmates arranged a 2020 re-release of the album that includes deleted songs, demos, and live tracks, entitled Wildflowers & All the Rest. Disc four, Wildflowers Live, consists of fourteen previously unreleased tracks, two of which had only been distributed to fan club members. These live tracks were recorded on various tours from 1995 to 2017. The super deluxe edition of the box set included a fifth disc of alternate versions of the Wildflowers tracks, called Finding Wildflowers. In April 2021, Finding Wildflowers was released individually.

== Documentary ==
The making of Wildflowers is the subject of the 2021 documentary film Tom Petty: Somewhere You Feel Free – The Making of Wildflowers, directed by Mary Wharton. The documentary includes a significant amount of archival footage from the recording sessions, recorded by Martyn Atkins, which had only recently been unearthed following Petty's death; as well as new interviews with many of the producers and musicians who had been involved with the album. The film was released in November 2021 on YouTube.

== Track listing ==
All tracks are written by Tom Petty, except where noted.

Wildflowers
No.	Title	Writer(s)	Length
1.	"Wildflowers"		3:11
2.	"You Don't Know How It Feels"		4:49
3.	"Time to Move On"		3:15
4.	"You Wreck Me"	Petty; Mike Campbell	3:22
5.	"It's Good to Be King"		5:10
6.	"Only a Broken Heart"		4:30
7.	"Honey Bee"		4:58
8.	"Don't Fade on Me"	Petty; Campbell	3:32
9.	"Hard on Me"		3:48
10.	"Cabin Down Below"		2:51
11.	"To Find a Friend"		3:23
12.	"A Higher Place"		3:56
13.	"House in the Woods"		5:32
14.	"Crawling Back to You"		5:05
15.	"Wake Up Time"		5:19
Total length:			62:48

All the Rest
No.	Title	Writer(s)	Length
1.	"Something Could Happen"		4:35
2.	"Leave Virginia Alone"		4:16
3.	"Climb That Hill Blues"	Petty; Campbell	2:33
4.	"Confusion Wheel"		4:20
5.	"California"		2:38
6.	"Harry Green"		3:54
7.	"Hope You Never"		3:03
8.	"Somewhere Under Heaven"	Petty; Campbell	4:37
9.	"Climb That Hill"	Petty; Campbell	3:34
10.	"Hung Up and Overdue"		6:03
Total length:			39:33

Home Recordings
No.	Title	Writer(s)	Length
1.	"There Goes Angela (Dream Away)"		3:50
2.	"You Don't Know How It Feels"		4:54
3.	"California"		3:44
4.	"A Feeling of Peace"		4:32
5.	"Leave Virginia Alone"		3:46
6.	"Crawling Back to You"		4:11
7.	"Don't Fade on Me"	Petty; Campbell	3:30
8.	"Confusion Wheel"		4:21
9.	"A Higher Place"		3:17
10.	"There's a Break in the Rain (Have Love Will Travel)"		3:37
11.	"To Find a Friend"		3:26
12.	"Only a Broken Heart"		3:56
13.	"Wake Up Time"		5:41
14.	"Hung Up and Overdue"		2:45
15.	"Wildflowers"		2:55
Total length:			58:25

Wildflowers Live
No.	Title	Writer(s)	Length
1.	"You Don't Know How It Feels"		6:48
2.	"Honey Bee"		5:21
3.	"To Find a Friend"		3:57
4.	"Walls"		3:22
5.	"Crawling Back to You"		5:06
6.	"Cabin Down Below"		3:04
7.	"Drivin' Down to Georgia"		6:24
8.	"House in the Woods"		5:38
9.	"Girl on LSD"		5:21
10.	"Time To Move On"		2:44
11.	"Wake Up Time"		5:35
12.	"It's Good to Be King"		11:38
13.	"You Wreck Me"	Petty; Campbell	5:44
14.	"Wildflowers"		4:31
Total length:			75:13

Alternate Versions (Finding Wildflowers)
No.	Title	Writer(s)	Length
1.	"A Higher Place"		3:51
2.	"Hard on Me"		3:49
3.	"Cabin Down Below"		3:47
4.	"Crawling Back to You"		5:06
5.	"Only a Broken Heart"		4:56
6.	"Drivin' Down to Georgia"		4:58
7.	"You Wreck Me"	Petty; Campbell	3:31
8.	"It's Good to Be King"		5:07
9.	"House in the Woods"		5:06
10.	"Honey Bee"		5:21
11.	"Girl on LSD"		3:45
12.	"Cabin Down Below (Acoustic)"		2:45
13.	"Wildflowers"		3:32
14.	"Don't Fade on Me"	Petty; Campbell	4:28
15.	"Wake Up Time"		5:31
16.	"You Saw Me Comin'"		4:38
Total length:			70:11

== Personnel ==
Personnel taken from the album's liner notes.

- Tom Petty – lead vocals (all tracks), acoustic guitar (1, 2, 6, 8, 9, 11, 12, 16–19, 20, 21, 25), electric guitar (2–5, 7, 10, 13, 14, 20, 22, 24), harmonica (2, 12, 20, 21), bass guitar (2, 12, 20), harmony vocals (2, 5, 14, 20–22, 24), Hammond organ (14), piano (15), tambourine (16, 24), harpsichord (22)
- Mike Campbell – electric guitar (tracks 2, 4, 5, 7, 9–14, 16, 17, 19, 20, 22–25), bass guitar (1, 3, 5, 6, 11, 13–15, 17, 23, 24), slide guitar (3, 25), acoustic guitar (8), Coral sitar (11), harpsichord (1), piano (20), 6-string bass (20), organ (23), drums (23)
- Benmont Tench – piano (tracks 1, 3–7, 9, 10, 12–14, 17, 25), grand piano (2), electric piano (2, 24), organ (4, 6, 9, 12, 14, 22, 25), Mellotron (6, 14, 25), tack piano (11, 16), harmonium (1, 6, 12, 16, 17, 19), harpsichord (25), zenon (11), Orchestron (12)
- Howie Epstein – harmony vocals (tracks 2, 4, 5, 13, 14, 16, 17, 19, 24), bass guitar (4, 7, 10, 16, 19, 22, 25), backing vocals (7)
- Steve Ferrone – drums (tracks 1–7, 9, 10, 12–15, 17, 19, 20, 22, 24)

Additional musicians

- Lenny Castro – percussion (tracks 1, 2, 5, 7, 9, 11, 12, 14, 25), tambourine (17)
- George Drakoulias – "must have played something" (track 1)
- Brandon Fields – saxophone (track 13)
- Greg Herbig – saxophone (track 13)
- Jim Horn – saxophone (track 13)
- Kim Hutchcroft – saxophone (track 13)
- Phil Jones – percussion (tracks 4, 10, 22), tambourine (20)
- Michael Kamen – orchestration, conductor (tracks 1, 3, 5, 15)
- Stan Lynch – drums (track 16) (tracks 3, 4, 9, 10, 15, 16 on Finding Wildflowers - Alternate Versions)
- John Pierce – bass guitar (track 9)
- Marty Rifkin – pedal steel guitar (track 13)
- Ringo Starr – drums (tracks 11, 25) (track 13 on Finding Wildflowers - Alternate Versions)
- Carl Wilson – backing vocals (tracks 7, 25)

Production

- Rick Rubin – producer (tracks 1–17, 19, 20, 22, 24, 25)
- Tom Petty – producer (all tracks), engineer (tracks 18, 21), mixer (track 18)
- Mike Campbell – producer (tracks 1–17, 19, 20, 22–25)
- Ryan Ulyate – producer and engineer (track 21), mixer (tracks 16, 17, 19, 20–25)
- Jim Scott – engineer (tracks 1–17, 19, 20, 22, 24, 25)
- David Bianco – engineer (tracks 1–15)
- Richard Dodd – engineer (tracks 1–15, 24), mixer (tracks 1–15)
- Brian Scheuble – engineer (track 23)
- Clif Norrell – engineer (track 24)
- Jeff Sheehan – assistant engineer (tracks 1–15, 19)
- Joe Barresi – assistant engineer (tracks 1–15, 17, 20, 22)
- Steve Holyrod – assistant engineer (tracks 1–16)
- Kenji Nasai – assistant mixer (tracks 1–15)
- Stephen Marcussen – mastering

== Charts ==
=== Weekly charts ===
Weekly chart performance for Wildflowers
Chart (1994)	Peak position
Australian Albums (ARIA)	38
Austrian Albums (Ö3 Austria)	13
Canada Top Albums/CDs (RPM)	11
Dutch Albums (Album Top 100)	75
German Albums (Offizielle Top 100)	15
New Zealand Albums (RMNZ)	29
Norwegian Albums (VG-lista)	20
Swedish Albums (Sverigetopplistan)	7
Swiss Albums (Schweizer Hitparade)	17
UK Albums (Official Charts)	36
US Billboard 200	8

Chart performance for Wildflowers & All the Rest
Chart (2020)	Peak position
Austrian Albums (Ö3 Austria)	9
Belgian Albums (Ultratop Flanders)	14
Belgian Albums (Ultratop Wallonia)	52
Canadian Albums (Billboard)	40
Dutch Albums (Album Top 100)	24
Finnish Albums (Suomen virallinen lista)	43
German Albums (Offizielle Top 100)	4
Hungarian Albums (MAHASZ)	5
Irish Albums (Official Charts)	22
Italian Albums (FIMI)	66
New Zealand Albums (RMNZ)	35
Norwegian Albums (VG-lista)	14
Scottish Albums (Official Charts)	6
Spanish Albums (PROMUSICAE)	11
Swiss Albums (Schweizer Hitparade)	10
UK Albums (Official Charts)	19
US Billboard 200	5
US Top Rock Albums (Billboard)	1

Chart performance for Finding Wildflowers
Chart (2021)	Peak position
Swedish Physical Albums (Sverigetopplistan)	11
Swedish Vinyl Albums (Sverigetopplistan)	10
US Billboard 200	112

=== Year-end charts ===
Year-end chart performance for Wildflowers
Chart (1995)	Position
US Billboard 200	16
Chart (2020)	Position
US Top Rock Albums (Billboard)	64
Chart (2021)	Position
US Top Rock Albums (Billboard)	78

Chart performance for singles from Wildflowers
Year	Single	Chart	Position
1994	"You Don't Know How It Feels"	US Mainstream Rock Chart	1
1995	"You Don't Know How It Feels"	US Billboard Hot 100	13
1995	"You Wreck Me"	US Mainstream Rock Chart	2
1995	"It's Good to Be King"	US Mainstream Rock Chart	6
1995	"A Higher Place"	US Mainstream Rock Chart	12

== Certifications ==
Certifications for Wildflowers
Region	Certification	Certified units/sales
Canada (Music Canada)	2× Platinum	200,000^{^}
United Kingdom (BPI)	Silver	60,000^{‡}
United States (RIAA)	3× Platinum	3,000,000^{^}
^{^} Shipments figures based on certification alone.^{‡} Sales+streaming figures based on certification alone.
