= Walls (Circus) =

Original song written and composed by Tom Petty; from the 1996 film "She's the One"

Single by Tom Petty and the Heartbreakers

from the album Songs and Music from "She's the One"
- B-side: "Walls (No. 3)"; "Hung Up and Overdue" (European CD single)
- Released: July 16, 1996
- Genre: Rock; psychedelic pop; country pop
- Length: 4:25
- Label: Warner Bros.
- Songwriter: Tom Petty
- Producers: Rick Rubin; Tom Petty; Mike Campbell

Tom Petty and the Heartbreakers singles chronology
"A Higher Place" (1995)	"Walls (Circus)" (1996)	"Change the Locks" (1996)

"Walls (Circus)" is a song written by American singer-songwriter Tom Petty and recorded by Tom Petty and the Heartbreakers. It was released in July 1996 as the first single from their soundtrack album Songs and Music from "She's the One". The song features Lindsey Buckingham on background vocals and was recorded at Sound City Studios by engineer Sylvia Massy. The song peaked at number 69 on the US Billboard Hot 100 chart and reached number two in Canada. An alternate arrangement of the song, played at a faster tempo, was included on the soundtrack and the B-side of the single under the title "Walls (No. 3)". The song was later covered by Glen Campbell on his 2008 album Meet Glen Campbell and by the Lumineers on the first anniversary of Petty's death.

== Style and reception ==
Tyler Wilcox of Uncut describes the upbeat, radio-friendly "Walls (Circus)" as a "swirling psychedelic pop number bolstered by Lindsey Buckingham's polyphonic backing vocals and an instantly memorable chorus." Also for Uncut, Mark Beaumont writes, "initially disguised as a chamber acoustic ballad, this Beatledelic flume of psychedelic country pop [...] is among Petty's finest and most colourful compositions." Al Shipley of Spin calls it a "jangly single", while Bryan Wawzenek of Ultimate Classic Rock calls it a "swaggering" track with "merry-go-round keyboards, sweet strings and yelping backing vocals from Lindsey Buckingham." The song was praised by Uproxx's Steven Hyden, who recalled it being a mild MTV hit and described it as "Tom's last big pop moment, and it includes some truly epic backing vocals from his best friend [Buckingham]." Stephen Thomas Erlewine of AllMusic highlighted the song's "circular harmonies" as an example of the variety on She's the One.

The song's genesis laid with Johnny Cash, who wrote the song's opening line, "Some days are diamonds, and some days are rocks." Beaumont highlighted the song's "luminous showmanship", courtesy of Petty, and the "none-more-Pepper of psychedelic elephants and Buddhist Jennifer Anistons." Wilcox and critic Dave Swanson note that the song is led by 12-string guitar.

Petty had a disliking for "Walls (Circus)". He told Men's Journal in 2015, "Never listened to it. I hated that record – the whole idea of it offended me. I only did it because I didn't have anything else to do." In a 2025 ranking by Ultimate Classic Rock of the opening songs to Petty's 16 studio albums, "Walls (Circus)" finished 15th.

== Music video ==
Maxine Bahns, Edward Burns and Jennifer Aniston appeared in the video. The music video was directed by Phil Joanou and was premiered in July 1996.

== Charts ==
=== Weekly charts ===
Chart (1996)	Peak position
Canada Top Singles (RPM)	2
US Billboard Hot 100	69
US Adult Alternative Airplay (Billboard)	1
US Adult Pop Airplay (Billboard)	25
US Mainstream Rock (Billboard)	6
US Pop Airplay (Billboard)	32

=== Year-end charts ===
Chart (1996)	Position
Canada Top Singles (RPM)	32
US Mainstream Rock Tracks (Billboard)	41
US Triple-A (Billboard)	14

== "Walls (No. 3)" ==
"Walls (No. 3)"

Single by Tom Petty and the Heartbreakers

from the album Songs and Music from "She's the One"
- A-side: "Walls (Circus)"
- Released: August 6, 1996
- Length: 3:03
- Label: Warner Bros.
- Songwriter: Tom Petty
- Producers: Rick Rubin, Tom Petty, Mike Campbell

Track 12 on the album is a faster, more mellow version titled "Walls (No. 3)". It has the same lyrics and melody, but the intro is different and the song in general has less emphasis on the instruments.
