= Adult Alternative Airplay =

Billboard chart

Adult Alternative Airplay (also known as Triple A or Triple A Airplay, and formerly Adult Alternative Songs and Triple A Songs) is a record chart currently published by Billboard that ranks the most popular songs on adult album alternative radio stations. The 40-position chart is formulated based on each song's weekly radio spins, as measured by Nielsen Broadcast Data Systems. The current number-one song on the chart is "Talk It Over" by Leon Bridges.

== History ==
The earliest incarnation of the chart was first published on February 21, 1992 by a music industry trade publication The Hard Report.

It was included in the January 20, 1996 edition of Billboard, as a feature in Billboard sister publication Airplay Monitor. In 2006, Airplay Monitor ceased publication after Billboard parent company VNU Media's acquisition of rival radio trade magazine Radio & Records, which then subsequently incorporated Airplay Monitor's Nielsen-based Triple A chart.

Billboard itself began publishing the Triple A chart in the issue dated July 5, 2008, through their Billboard.biz website, appropriating the same airplay data as Radio & Records. Radio & Records closed in June 2009, leaving Billboard as the sole publisher of the chart. In February 2014, the chart's reporting panel was expanded from 23 to 32 stations, including non-commercial reporters for the first time.

Following a re-design of their website, Billboard officially incorporated the history of the Airplay Monitor/Nielsen chart from 1996 to 2008 into their Adult Alternative Songs chart. The Billboard website and its official chart archive now show the first Adult Alternative Songs chart as having been published on January 20, 1996, with "The World I Know" by Collective Soul as its first number one single. Radio And Records first charted their Adult Alternative chart in the September 22, 1995, issue. It was a 30 position chart, and "Til I Hear It from You" by the Gin Blossoms was the first number one.

== All-time achievements ==
In 2021, for the 25th anniversary of the chart, Billboard compiled a ranking of the 50 best-performing songs and artists on the chart over the 25 years. "One Headlight" by The Wallflowers was ranked as the #1 song, while Dave Matthews Band was ranked as the #1 artist. Listed below are the top 10 songs and the top 10 artists.

=== Top 10 Greatest of All Time Adult Alternative Songs (1996–2021) ===
Rank	Single	Year released	Artist(s)	Peak and duration
1.	"One Headlight"	1997	The Wallflowers	#1 for 14 weeks
2.	"Clocks"	2002	Coldplay	#1 for 15 weeks
3.	"3AM"	1997	Matchbox 20	#1 for 14 weeks
4.	"Feel It Still"	2017	Portugal. The Man	#1 for 11 weeks
5.	"Drops of Jupiter (Tell Me)"	2001	Train	#1 for 14 weeks
6.	"Babylon"	2000	David Gray	#1 for 2 weeks
7.	"It's Time"	2012	Imagine Dragons	#2 for 5 weeks
8.	"See The World"	2007	Gomez	#1 for 4 weeks
9.	"Rolling in the Deep"	2010	Adele	#1 for 14 weeks
10.	"Beautiful Day"	2000	U2	#1 for 16 weeks

=== Top 10 Greatest of All Time Adult Alternative Artists (1996–2021) ===
Rank	Artist
1.	Dave Matthews Band
2.	U2
3.	Coldplay
4.	Jack Johnson
5.	Sheryl Crow
6.	John Mayer
7.	Mumford & Sons
8.	Counting Crows
9.	Death Cab for Cutie
10.	Snow Patrol

== Song records ==
=== Most weeks at number-one ===
Number of weeks	Artist	Song	Year(s)	Source
16	U2	"Beautiful Day"	2000–01	
15	Coldplay	"Clocks"	2003	
15	Kings of Leon	"Waste a Moment"	2016–17	
14	The Wallflowers	"One Headlight"	1996–97	
14	Matchbox Twenty	"3AM"	1997–98	
14	Matchbox Twenty	"Bent"	2000	
14	Train	"Drops of Jupiter (Tell Me)"	2001	
14	Adele	"Rolling in the Deep"	2011	
13	Santana featuring Rob Thomas	"Smooth"	1999	
13	Jack Johnson	"Upside Down"	2006	
13	Pearl Jam	"Just Breathe"	2010	
13	Gotye featuring Kimbra	"Somebody That I Used to Know"	2012	

=== Most weeks on the chart ===
Number of weeks	Artist	Song	Year(s)	Source
52	Kings of Leon	"Use Somebody"	2009–10	
51	John Mayer	"No Such Thing"	2001–02	
48	James Morrison	"Nothing Ever Hurt Like You"	2008–09	
47	Imagine Dragons	"It's Time"	2012–13	
46	Coldplay	"Clocks"	2002–03	
46	The Head and the Heart	"Lost in My Mind"	2011–12	
44	David Gray	"Babylon"	2000–01	
43	Los Lonely Boys	"Heaven"	2003–04	
42	Fitz and the Tantrums	"Out of My League"	2013–14	
41	One eskimO	"Kandi"	2009–10	

=== Highest debut ===
Debut Position	Artist	Song	Debut Date	Source
No. 1	U2	"Get On Your Boots"	February 7, 2009	
No. 2	Hootie & the Blowfish	"Old Man & Me (When I Get to Heaven)"	April 20, 1996	
No. 2	Coldplay	"Speed of Sound"	May 7, 2005	
No. 3	The Rolling Stones	"Anybody Seen My Baby?"	September 20, 1997	
No. 4	Gin Blossoms	"Follow You Down"	February 10, 1996	
No. 4	Tom Petty and the Heartbreakers	"Walls"	August 3, 1996	
No. 4	Coldplay	"Adventure of a Lifetime"	November 28, 2015	
No. 5	Natalie Merchant	"Kind & Generous"	May 16, 1998	
No. 5	Coldplay	"Violet Hill"	May 17, 2008	
No. 5	Mumford & Sons	"Believe"	March 28, 2015	

== Artist records ==
=== Most number-one singles ===
Number of singles	Artist	Source
14	U2	
13	Coldplay	
11	Dave Matthews (Note: Solo and with Dave Matthews Band)	
11	Jack Johnson	
10	Death Cab for Cutie	
9	The Black Keys	
8	John Mayer	
8	The Lumineers	
8	Hozier	
8	Cage the Elephant	

=== Most cumulative weeks at number-one ===
Number of weeks	Artist	Source
72	U2	
69	Coldplay	
62	Jack Johnson	
51	Dave Matthews	
51	Death Cab For Cutie	
48	The Black Keys	
46	The Lumineers	
43	Mumford & Sons	
36	Hozier	
33	Nathaniel Rateliff (Note: Solo and with The Night Sweats)	

=== Most top 10 singles ===
Number of singles	Artist	Source
31	U2	
26	Dave Matthews	
25	Coldplay	
19	Jack Johnson	
19	John Mayer	
17	The Black Keys	
16	Counting Crows	
16	Mumford & Sons	
16	Beck	
14	Sheryl Crow	
14	Death Cab for Cutie	

=== Most chart entries ===
Number of entries	Artist	Source
36	Dave Matthews	
36	U2	
30	Coldplay	
27	Jack Johnson	
26	Sheryl Crow	
26	John Mayer	
22	The Black Keys	
21	Beck	
20	Death Cab For Cutie	
19	Counting Crows	
19	Mumford & Sons	
19	Leon Bridges	
19	Kings of Leon	

== See also ==
- List of Radio & Records number-one adult alternative singles of the 1990s
- List of Billboard number-one adult alternative singles of the 2000s
- List of Billboard number-one adult alternative singles of the 2010s
- List of Billboard number-one adult alternative singles of the 2020s
