= Petty Country: A Country Music Celebration of Tom Petty =

2024 country tribute album to Tom Petty

Compilation album by various artists
- Released: June 21, 2024
- Studio: Various artists' studios
- Genre: Country
- Length: 76:40
- Label: Big Machine
- Producer: Scott Borchetta; George Drakoulias; Randall Poster

Singles from Petty Country: A Country Music Celebration of Tom Petty
- 1. "American Girl" Released: February 23, 2024; 2. "Southern Accents" Released: April 5, 2024; 3. "Refugee" Released: May 17, 2024; 4. "Learning to Fly" Released: May 31, 2024

Petty Country: A Country Music Celebration of Tom Petty is a 2024 tribute album celebrating the life of Tom Petty. It features 20 covers of Petty songs that feature a variety of country artists. The Tom Petty estate put the album together.

== Recording history ==
Many of the 20 featured artists released their songs ahead of time as singles, with the first being Dierks Bentley, who released his rendition of "American Girl" on February 23, 2024. Bentley gave high praise of the song, saying that, while it wasn't a country song, it was one of Tom Petty's "greatest songs in a life’s work of great American songs."

On April 6, 2024, Dolly Parton released a cover of "Southern Accents", accompanied by a music video. The video showcased "home videos and professional footage of Petty throughout his life."

Wynonna Judd and Lainey Wilson released a music video for "Refugee" on May 17, and Eli Young Band released one for "Learning to Fly" on June 3. The music videos captures their sessions in the studio to record the respective songs.

Other artists to release songs ahead of time include Steve Earle on May 10 with "Yer So Bad" and Margo Price on June 7 with "Ways to Be Wicked".

== Critical reception ==
Professional ratings
Aggregate scores
Source	Rating
Metacritic	63/100
Review scores
Source	Rating
AllMusic	4/5 stars
Mojo	3/5 stars
PopMatters	5/10
Record Collector	2/5 stars
Riff	7/10
Uncut	6/10

According to the review aggregator Metacritic, Petty Country: A Country Music Celebration of Tom Petty received "generally favorable reviews" based on a weighted average score of 63 out of 100 from 5 critic scores.

== Track listing ==
Petty Country: A Country Music Celebration of Tom Petty track listing
No.	Title	Artist	Length
1.	"I Should Have Known It"	Chris Stapleton	3:56
2.	"Wildflowers"	Thomas Rhett	3:15
3.	"Runnin' Down a Dream"	Luke Combs	4:07
4.	"Southern Accents"	Dolly Parton	4:27
5.	"Here Comes My Girl"	Justin Moore	4:43
6.	"American Girl"	Dierks Bentley	3:03
7.	"Stop Draggin' My Heart Around"	Lady A	4:18
8.	"I Forgive It All"	Jamey Johnson	4:26
9.	"I Won't Back Down"	Brothers Osborne	2:58
10.	"Refugee"	Wynonna Judd feat. Lainey Wilson	3:50
11.	"Angel Dream (No. 2)"	Willie Nelson and Lukas Nelson	2:29
12.	"Learning to Fly"	Eli Young Band	3:25
13.	"Breakdown"	Ryan Hurd feat. Carly Pearce	3:09
14.	"Yer So Bad"	Steve Earle	2:58
15.	"Ways to Be Wicked"	Margo Price feat. Mike Campbell	3:27
16.	"Mary Jane's Last Dance"	Midland	5:04
17.	"Free Fallin'"	The Cadillac Three feat. Breland	4:35
18.	"I Need to Know"	Marty Stuart and His Fabulous Superlatives	2:38
19.	"Don't Come Around Here No More"	Rhiannon Giddens feat. Silkroad Ensemble and Benmont Tench	4:36
20.	"You Wreck Me" (Live)	George Strait	5:16
Total length:			76:40

== Production ==
- Scott Borchetta, George Drakoulias, Randall Poster – executive production
- Adria Petty – Tom Petty creative
- Sandi Spika Borchetta, Justin Ford – art direction
- Don Phillips – cover artwork, package design
- Mark Seliger, Dennis Callahan – photography
- Alan Weidel – facilities and equipment management
- Alison Tavel – archives production and direction

== Charts ==
Chart performance for Petty Country: A Country Music Celebration of Tom Petty
Chart (2024)	Peak position
US Billboard 200	84
US Top Compilation Albums (Billboard)	1
