= The Live Anthology =

Live album by Tom Petty and the Heartbreakers
- Released: November 23, 2009
- Recorded: December 31, 1978 – November 15, 2007
- Venue: Various
- Genres: Heartland rock; rock
- Length: 3:47:21 (standard); 4:47:40 (deluxe)
- Label: Reprise
- Producers: Tom Petty; Mike Campbell; Ryan Ulyate

Tom Petty and the Heartbreakers chronology
The Last DJ (2002)	The Live Anthology (2009)	Mojo (2010)

Tom Petty chronology
Mudcrutch (2008)	The Live Anthology (2009)	Mojo (2010)

Professional ratings
Aggregate scores
Source	Rating
Metacritic	90/100
Review scores
Source	Rating
AllMusic	4/5 stars
The Austin Chronicle	4/5 stars
The A.V. Club	A
Entertainment Weekly	A−
The Independent	4/5 stars
Los Angeles Times	4/4 stars
Mojo	3/5 stars
Rolling Stone	4.5/5 stars
Uncut	4/5 stars

The Live Anthology is a live box set by American rock band Tom Petty and the Heartbreakers. The box set was released by Reprise Records on November 23, 2009, in a number of formats, with the standard CD and download formats, composed of 48 tracks (on 4 discs).

The album's cover artwork and packaging was designed by Shepard Fairey.

== Background ==
In an interview with Rolling Stone magazine, Petty stated he compiled live material with Mike Campbell and Ryan Ulyate from three decades of live concerts.

In 2008, Ulyate began going through Petty's live archive and created an iTunes library of 170 concerts with a total of 3,509 performances of 400 unique songs. "I made sure Tom and Mike heard every song they ever did", Ulyate said, "And I ranked the concerts with a star system."

Throughout his career, Petty extensively documented his concerts, beginning in the late seventies. "I'm glad we did it. I think this is one of the great live rock & roll bands. And you really understand us once you've heard this set. It was a lot of fun to put together."

Several other songs were mixed, but did not make it to the album. "Shadow of a Doubt (A Complex Kid)", "Don't Do Me Like That" and Eddie Cochran's "Somethin' Else" performed at the Hammersmith Odeon, March 6, 1980, were released on the deluxe edition of Damn the Torpedoes.

== Track listing ==
All tracks written by Tom Petty, except where noted.

=== Standard edition ===
Disc one
No.	Title	Writer(s)	Location	Length
1.	"Ladies and Gentlemen..." (June 30, 1981)	Jim Lenahan	The Forum, Los Angeles	1:16
2.	"Nightwatchman" (June 28, 1981)	Petty, Mike Campbell	The Forum, Los Angeles	4:33
3.	"Even the Losers" (March 6, 1980)		Hammersmith Odeon, London, England	3:40
4.	"Here Comes My Girl" (March 6, 1980)	Petty, Mike Campbell	Hammersmith Odeon, London, England	4:52
5.	"A Thing About You" (June 28, 1981)		The Forum, Los Angeles	5:05
6.	"I'm in Love" (December 7, 1982)	Bobby Womack	Wembley Arena, London, England	3:55
7.	"I'm a Man" (September 21, 2006)	Ellas McDaniel, Koko Taylor	Stephen C. O’Connell Center, Gainesville, Florida	2:46
8.	"Straight into Darkness" (December 7, 1982)		Wembley Arena, London, England	4:35
9.	"Breakdown" (June 30, 1981)		The Forum, Los Angeles	7:55
10.	"Something in the Air" (November 4, 1993)	Speedy Keen	Stephen C. O’Connell Center, Gainesville, Florida	3:50
11.	"I Just Want to Make Love to You" (March 17, 1995)	Willie Dixon	Maple Leaf Gardens, Toronto	3:55
12.	"Drivin' Down to Georgia" (November 4, 1993)		Stephen C. O’Connell Center, Gainesville, Florida	6:25
13.	"Lost Without You" (November 4, 1993)		Stephen C. O’Connell Center, Gainesville, Florida	6:55
14.	"Refugee" (June 11, 1983)	Petty, Mike Campbell	Irvine Meadows, Irvine, California	6:05
Total length:				1:05:47

Disc two
No.	Title	Writer(s)	Location	Length
1.	"Diddy Wah Diddy" (February 1, 1997)	McDaniel, Dixon	The Fillmore, San Francisco	2:55
2.	"I Want You Back Again" (February 7, 1997)	Rod Argent	The Fillmore, San Francisco	2:54
3.	"Wildflowers" (March 17, 1995)		Maple Leaf Gardens, Toronto	3:12
4.	"Friend of the Devil" (February 3, 1997)	John Dawson, Jerome Garcia, Robert Hunter	The Fillmore, San Francisco	5:41
5.	"A Woman in Love (It's Not Me)" (June 29, 1981)	Petty, Mike Campbell	The Forum, Los Angeles	5:42
6.	"It's Good to Be King" (September 21, 2006)		Stephen C. O’Connell Center, Gainesville, Florida	12:14
7.	"Angel Dream (No. 2)" (April 19, 2003)		The Vic Theatre, Chicago	2:56
8.	"Learning to Fly" (June 16, 2006)	Petty, Jeff Lynne	Bonnaroo Music and Arts Festival, Manchester, Tennessee	4:44
9.	"Mary Jane's Last Dance" (September 21, 2006)		Stephen C. O’Connell Center, Gainesville, Florida	5:54
10.	"Mystic Eyes" (October 27, 2006)	Van Morrison	The Greek Theatre, Berkeley, California	8:59
Total length:				55:11

Disc three
No.	Title	Writer(s)	Location	Length
1.	"Jammin' Me" (February 7, 1997)	Petty, Mike Campbell, Bob Dylan	The Fillmore, San Francisco	4:32
2.	"The Wild One, Forever" (March 6, 1980)		Hammersmith Odeon, London, England	3:35
3.	"Green Onions" (February 6, 1997)	Steve Cropper, Al Jackson Jr., Booker T. Jones, Lewie Steinberg	The Fillmore, San Francisco	4:19
4.	"Louisiana Rain" (December 7, 1982)		Wembley Arena, London, England	5:10
5.	"Melinda" (August 26, 2003)	Petty, Benmont Tench	UNO Lakefront Arena, New Orleans	8:15
6.	"Goldfinger" (January 31, 1997)	John Barry, Leslie Bricusse, Anthony Newley	The Fillmore, San Francisco	4:02
7.	"Surrender" (June 11, 1983)		Irvine Meadows, Irvine, California	3:11
8.	"Dreamville" (October 16, 2002)		Grand Olympic Auditorium, Los Angeles	2:54
9.	"Spike" (July 29, 1986)		Portland Civic Stadium, Portland, Oregon	7:40
10.	"Any Way You Want It" (June 11, 1983)	Dave Clark	Irvine Meadows, Irvine, California	2:59
11.	"American Girl" (April 13, 1983)		The Cow Palace, San Francisco	5:19
Total length:				52:56

Disc four
No.	Title	Writer(s)	Location	Length
1.	"Runnin' Down a Dream" (September 21, 2006)	Petty, Mike Campbell, Jeff Lynne	Stephen C. O’Connell Center, Gainesville, Florida	5:11
2.	"Oh Well" (June 16, 2006)	Peter Green	Bonnaroo Music and Arts Festival, Manchester, Tennessee	3:35
3.	"Southern Accents" (September 21, 2006)		Stephen C. O’Connell Center, Gainesville, Florida	5:00
4.	"Crawling Back to You" (August 26, 2005)		The Greek Theatre, Berkeley, California	4:38
5.	"My Life / Your World" (June 23, 1987)	Petty, Mike Campbell	Blossom Music Center, Cuyahoga Falls, Ohio	4:55
6.	"I Won't Back Down" (November 15, 2007)	Petty, Jeff Lynne	American Museum of Natural History, New York	3:26
7.	"Square One" (June 17, 2006)		UMB Bank Pavilion, Maryland Heights, Missouri	3:44
8.	"Have Love Will Travel" (July 5, 2002)		Saratoga Performing Arts Center, Saratoga Springs, New York	3:57
9.	"Free Fallin'" (August 14, 2005)	Petty, Jeff Lynne	Irvine Meadows, Irvine, California	4:46
10.	"The Waiting" (June 28, 1981)		The Forum, Los Angeles	4:14
11.	"Good, Good Lovin'" (June 30, 1981)	James Brown, Albert Shubert	The Forum, Los Angeles	2:50
12.	"Century City" (July 8, 1980)		The Spectrum, Philadelphia	4:22
13.	"Alright for Now" (March 17, 1995)		Maple Leaf Gardens, Toronto	2:49
Total length:				53:27

=== Deluxe edition ===
On November 22, 2009, prior to the release of the standard and digital formats, Best Buy stores offered an 'exclusive' "Deluxe Edition" of the box set. (Although labelled 'exclusive' to Best Buy, this set was on general release in Europe.) The deluxe edition contains the four discs in the standard edition, and includes a fifth disc of live material, two previously unreleased DVDs, a vinyl remastering of the 1977 promotional EP Official Live 'Leg (recorded December 12, 1976), and a Blu-ray Disc featuring all 62 songs from the five CDs in the box set in 5.1 multi-channel 96k 24-bit audio. The packaging for this edition also includes a concert poster, backstage pass reproductions, a deluxe booklet, a lithograph and more bonus materials.

Disc five
No.	Title	Writer(s)	Location	Length
1.	"Think About Me" (July 24, 1987)		Jacksonville Memorial Coliseum, Jacksonville, Florida	3:54
2.	"Down South" (September 17, 2006)		Austin City Limits Music Festival, Austin, Texas	3:16
3.	"I Need to Know" (June 29, 1981)		The Forum, Los Angeles	2:29
4.	"Billy the Kid" (May 28, 2001)		Chronicle Pavilion, Concord, California	5:09
5.	"I'd Like to Love You Baby" (April 21, 2003)	J. J. Cale	Soundstage Studios, Chicago	4:08
6.	"Image of Me" (October 10, 1987)	Wayne Kemp	Wembley Arena, London, England	2:51
7.	"Born in Chicago" (April 21, 2003)	Nick Gravenites	Soundstage Studios, Chicago	3:50
8.	"Like a Diamond" (October 16, 2002)		Grand Olympic Auditorium, Los Angeles	4:40
9.	"The Last DJ" (December 7, 2002)		The Palace of Auburn Hills, Auburn Hills, Michigan	3:36
10.	"No Second Thoughts" (July 27, 1981)		The Spectrum, Philadelphia	3:33
11.	"Ballad of Easy Rider" (July 24, 1987)	Roger McGuinn	Jacksonville Memorial Coliseum, Jacksonville, Florida	3:08
12.	"Don't Come Around Here No More" (July 7, 2001)	Petty, Dave Stewart	Saratoga Performing Arts Center, Saratoga Springs, New York	6:30
13.	"Too Much Ain't Enough" (December 31, 1978)		Santa Monica Civic Auditorium, Santa Monica, California	5:10
14.	"County Farm" (February 4, 1997)	arranged by Tom Petty	The Fillmore, San Francisco	8:11
Total length:				1:00:19

1978 New Year's Eve concert from Santa Monica, California
No.	Title	Writer(s)	Length
1.	"I Need to Know"		2:22
2.	"Surrender"		2:52
3.	"Fooled Again (I Don't Like It)"		6:44
4.	"Casa Dega"	Petty, Campbell	5:22
5.	"Refugee"	Petty, Campbell	3:46
6.	"You're Gonna Get It"		4:19
7.	"Mystery Man"		3:18
8.	"American Girl"		4:22
9.	"Breakdown"		7:11
10.	"Too Much Ain't Enough"		4:53
11.	"Shout"	The Isley Brothers	8:57
Total length:			56:55

DVD: 400 Days, a documentary shot during the recording and tour for the album Wildflowers.

Official Live 'Leg
No.	Title	Writer(s)	Length
1.	"Jaguar and Thunderbird"	Chuck Berry	2:28
2.	"Fooled Again (I Don't Like It)"		5:17
3.	"Luna"		4:17
4.	"Dog On the Run"		9:22
Total length:			21:24

== Personnel ==
Tom Petty and the Heartbreakers

- Tom Petty (1976–2007) – lead vocals, rhythm guitar, lead guitar, harmonica, percussion, keyboards on "Luna"
- Mike Campbell (1976–2007) – lead guitar, rhythm guitar, mandolin, Marxophone
- Benmont Tench (1976–2007) – piano, keyboards, backing vocals
- Scott Thurston (1993–2007) – backing vocals, rhythm guitar, keyboards, harmonica, percussion
- Ron Blair (1976–1981, 2002–2006) – bass guitar, backing vocals
- Howie Epstein (1982–2001) – bass guitar, backing vocals, co-lead vocal on "Something In The Air"
- Stan Lynch (1976–1993) – drums, percussion, backing vocals
- Steve Ferrone (1995–2006) – drums, percussion

Additional musicians

- Phil Jones – percussion (1981–1983)
- The Big Money Orchestra, arranged and conducted by Jon Brion – strings and horns on "Dreamville", strings on "Like a Diamond"
- David Hoskot – percussion on "My Life/Your World"
- Stevie Nicks – backing vocals on "Learning to Fly"
- Bobby Valentino – violin on "Louisiana Rain"
- Del Shannon – rhythm guitar and backing vocal on "Breakdown" (1978 New Year's Eve concert DVD)
- Phil Seymour – backing vocal on "Breakdown" (1978 New Year's Eve concert DVD)

Production

- Chris Bellman – mastering
- Mike Campbell – producer
- Shepard Fairey – artwork
- Tom Petty – producer
- Ryan Ulyate – producer, mixer
- Michael Zagaris – booklet photography
