= Pack Up the Plantation: Live! =

Live album by Tom Petty and the Heartbreakers
- Released: November 25, 1985
- Recorded: July 16, 1978–August 7, 1985
- Venues: Paradise Theater, Boston; Hammersmith Odeon, London; The Forum, Los Angeles; The Coliseum, Richfield, Ohio; Irvine Meadows Amphitheatre, Irvine, California
- Genre: Rock
- Length: 71:12
- Label: MCA
- Producers: Tom Petty; Mike Campbell

Tom Petty and the Heartbreakers chronology
Southern Accents (1985)	Pack Up the Plantation: Live! (1985)	Let Me Up (I've Had Enough) (1987)

Singles from Pack Up the Plantation: Live!
- 1. "So You Want to Be a Rock 'n' Roll Star" / "American Girl" Released: 1985; 2. "Needles and Pins"/"Spike" Released: December 1985; 3. "Refugee"/"Don't Do Me Like That" Released: 1986

Pack Up the Plantation: Live! is the first official live album by Tom Petty and the Heartbreakers, released in November 1985 by MCA Records. It was released as a double LP and, in slightly truncated form, a single cassette or compact disc. A concert film of the same name was released on home video in 1986. Stevie Nicks sings on two songs, including the US single "Needles and Pins", which reached No. 37 on the Billboard Hot 100.

== Background ==
The album was primarily recorded at the Wiltern Theatre in Los Angeles during the band's 1985 tour, but also includes several tracks from previous tours. Stevie Nicks, who collaborated with Petty and frequently appeared with him on tour, sings with him on two songs on the album. The first is a cover of the Searchers' 1964 hit "Needles and Pins," which was released as a single and reached No. 37 in the Billboard Hot 100. Nicks' second track is "Insider", one of two cuts from Petty's 1981 LP Hard Promises that feature her.

"Breakdown" is notable because the audience takes over from Petty at the start, singing the first two verses and the chorus loud enough to be picked up by the mics. Petty quips, "You're going to put me out of a job", to huge applause, then launches into a reprise of the second verse.

== Releases ==
No other singles were released from the album in the United States, although a cover of the Byrds' 1967 hit "So You Want to Be a Rock 'n' Roll Star" was released in Europe. "Refugee" was also issued in Europe on a four-track EP.

A concert film of the Wiltern Theatre performance, also titled Pack Up the Plantation: Live!, was released on home video in 1986. It included songs that did not make the album, such as originals "Don't Do Me Like That" and "Don't Come Around Here No More", as well as covers such as "Little Bit O' Soul" and "Route 66".

== Reception ==
Professional ratings
Review scores
Source	Rating
AllMusic	2.5/5 stars
Blender	1/5 stars
Chicago Tribune	3/4 stars
The Encyclopedia of Popular Music	3/5 stars
The Essential Rock Discography	4/10
MusicHound Rock	3.5/5 stars
The Rolling Stone Album Guide	3/5 stars
Sounds	2/5 stars

Sandy Robertson, writing for Sounds, described it as "a turgid four-sided video soundtrack". Jimmy Guterman, writing for Rolling Stone, said that Petty "sounds impassioned and impressive when he lays into his early songs", and that the Heartbreakers are "an undeniably great band."

In a retrospective review for AllMusic, Stephen Thomas Erlewine felt the album was a logical follow-up to the band's album Southern Accents, "criticized from many corners for being too slick," but relied too much on that album's material. He concluded that Pack Up the Plantation featured "strong performance and neat surprises", which "alone makes it worth investigating for dedicated fans, even if it doesn't quite deliver the knockout punch many listeners might have wanted."

== Track listing ==
All tracks are written by Tom Petty, except as noted.

Side one
No.	Title	Writer(s)	Length
1.	"So You Want to Be a Rock 'n' Roll Star"	Chris Hillman, Roger McGuinn	3:30
2.	"Needles and Pins"	Sonny Bono, Jack Nitzsche	2:23
3.	"The Waiting"		5:08
4.	"Breakdown"		7:43

Side two
No.	Title	Writer(s)	Length
1.	"American Girl"		3:50
2.	"It Ain't Nothin' to Me"	Petty, David A. Stewart	6:05
3.	"Insider"		5:16
4.	"Rockin' Around (With You)"	Petty, Mike Campbell	3:20

Side three
No.	Title	Writer(s)	Length
1.	"Refugee"	Petty, Campbell	5:22
2.	"I Need to Know" (LP and cassette only)		2:30
3.	"Southern Accents"		5:20
4.	"Rebels"		6:10

Side four
No.	Title	Writer(s)	Length
1.	"Don't Bring Me Down"	Gerry Goffin, Carole King	3:40
2.	"You Got Lucky" (LP and cassette only)		4:20
3.	"Shout"	O'Kelly Isley, Ronald Isley, Rudolph Isley	9:30
4.	"Stories We Could Tell"	John Sebastian	3:55

The two songs appearing only on vinyl or cassette have never been officially released on CD. Both songs were also initially not included in the 2015 Hi-Rez remaster, despite being a digital download without time limits. However, after fan response, they were belatedly added to the release.

== Recording information ==
All tracks recorded at the Wiltern Theatre, Los Angeles, California, August 7, 1985, except:

- "Don't Bring Me Down" – Paradise Theater, Boston, July 16, 1978
- "Stories We Could Tell" – Hammersmith Odeon, London, England, March 7, 1980, engineered by Charles Kaplan in the Mobile Manor Unit
- "Needles and Pins", "Insider" – The Forum, Los Angeles, June 1981
- "Shout" – The Coliseum, Richfield, Ohio, March 19, 1983
- "Rockin' Around (with You)" – Irvine Meadows Amphitheatre, Irvine, California, June 1983

== Personnel ==
Tom Petty and the Heartbreakers

- Tom Petty – lead vocals, 6 and 12-string electric guitars, acoustic guitar
- Mike Campbell – lead guitar, 12-string, lap steel, slide guitars
- Benmont Tench – keyboards, vocals
- Howie Epstein – bass guitar, mandolin, backing vocals
- Stan Lynch – drums, vocals

Soul Lips Horns (on tracks recorded at the Wiltern Theater)

- Jimmy Zavala – saxes, harmonica
- Lee Thornburg – trumpets, flugel horn
- Nick Lane – trombones, euphonium

The Rebeletts (on tracks recorded at the Wiltern Theater)

- Pat Peterson – backing vocals, percussion
- Caroll Sue Hill – backing vocals, percussion

Additional musicians

- Ron Blair – bass guitar on "Insider", "Needles and Pins", "Stories We Could Tell", "Don't Bring Me Down"
- Phil Jones – percussion on "Insider", "Needles and Pins", "Rockin' Around (With You)", "Shout"
- Bobby Valentino – violin on "Stories We Could Tell"
- Stevie Nicks – vocals on "Insider", "Needles and Pins"

Technical

- Tom Petty – producer
- Mike Campbell – producer
- Don Smith – engineer
- Alan Weidel – assistant engineer
- Doug Field – engineer
- Mike Craver – engineer
- Charles Kaplan – engineer ("Stories We Could Tell")
- Shelly Yakus – engineer ("Shout", "Needles and Pins", "Insider")
- Stephen Marcussen – mastering

== Charts ==
Chart performance for Pack Up the Plantation: Live!
Year	Chart	Position
1986	US Billboard 200	22
