= Pack Up the Plantation: Live! (film) =

Pack up the Plantation: Live!
- Directed by: Jeff Stein
- Produced by: Kim Dempster, Kathleen Dougherty
- Starring: Tom Petty; Mike Campbell; Howie Epstein; Stan Lynch; Benmont Tench
- Distributed by: MCA Home Video
- Release date: January 1986
- Running time: 96 minutes
- Country: United States
- Language: English

Pack up the Plantation Live! is a concert film featuring Tom Petty and the Heartbreakers. It was filmed at two concerts at the Wiltern Theatre in Los Ángeles, California on August 6 & 7, 1985 during their Southern Accents Tour. It has yet to be released on DVD.

== Songs performed ==
- "American Girl"
- "You Got Lucky"
- "It Ain't Nothin' To Me"
- "Don't Do Me Like That"
- "The Waiting"
- "I Need to Know"
- "Don't Come Around Here No More"
- "Spike"
- "Southern Accents"
- "Rebels"
- "Breakdown"
- "Refugee"
- "Little Bit O' Soul"
- "So You Want To Be a Rock 'n' Roll Star"
- "Make It Better (Forget About Me)"
- "Route 66"

== Personnel ==
=== The Heartbreakers ===
- Tom Petty – 6 & 12-string electric & acoustic guitars, lead vocals
- Mike Campbell – lead guitar, 12-string, lap steel & slide guitars
- Howie Epstein – bass, mandolin & harmony vocals
- Benmont Tench – keyboards & backing vocals
- Stan Lynch – drums & backing vocals

=== Soul Lips Horns ===
- Jimmy Zavala – saxes, harmonica
- Lee Thornburg – trumpets, flugelhorn, flugelbone
- Nick Lane – trombones, euphonium

=== The Rebeletts ===
- Pat Peterson – backing vocals, percussion
- Carroll Sue Hill – backing vocals, percussion
