= Let Me Up (I've Had Enough) =

Studio album by Tom Petty and the Heartbreakers
- Released: April 27, 1987
- Recorded: 1986–87
- Studios: Sound City and M.C. Studios (Los Angeles, California)
- Genre: Heartland rock
- Length: 41:08
- Label: MCA
- Producers: Tom Petty; Mike Campbell

Tom Petty and the Heartbreakers chronology
Pack Up the Plantation: Live! (1985)	Let Me Up (I've Had Enough) (1987)	Into the Great Wide Open (1991)

Tom Petty chronology
Pack Up the Plantation: Live! (1985)	Let Me Up (I've Had Enough) (1987)	Full Moon Fever (1989)

Singles from Let Me Up (I've Had Enough)
- 1. "Jammin' Me" Released: April 6, 1987; 2. "All Mixed Up" Released: 1987

Let Me Up (I've Had Enough) (styled on the cover with quotation marks) is the seventh studio album by American rock band Tom Petty and the Heartbreakers, released on April 27, 1987. It features the most songwriting collaborations between Petty and lead guitarist Mike Campbell on any Petty album. It is the first album without then-former bassist Ron Blair on any tracks, as well as the first since Damn the Torpedoes not produced by Jimmy Iovine.

The Heartbreakers' approach when starting to work on the album in 1986 was to make it sound like a live recording. This technique contrasted with the heavy studio production on the band's previous album, Southern Accents, and was influenced by touring as Bob Dylan's backing band.

Let Me Up (I've Had Enough) is also notable for being the only previous studio album not represented on Petty's 1993 Greatest Hits album, even though the single "Jammin' Me" (co-written with fellow Traveling Wilbury Bob Dylan) was No. 1 on the Mainstream Rock Tracks for four weeks and No. 18 on the Hot 100. "Jammin' Me" was later included on the compilation album Anthology: Through the Years.

== Reception ==
Professional ratings
Review scores
Source	Rating
AllMusic	3/5 stars
Blender	3/5 stars
Chicago Tribune	2.5/4 stars
Christgau's Record Guide	B+
The Encyclopedia of Popular Music	3/5 stars
The Essential Rock Discography	5/10
MusicHound Rock	3.5/5 stars
Rolling Stone	(favorable)
The Rolling Stone Album Guide	3/5 stars

The album received generally positive reviews from critics. Stephen Thomas Erlewine from AllMusic described the album as "their simplest album since Hard Promises." However, he also stated that Let Me Up (I've Had Enough) was "filled with loose ends, song fragments, and unvarnished productions, it's a defiantly messy album, and it's all the better for it."

Cash Box said that the single "All Mixed Up" "tells a wondering, bittersweet story of life and love in the 80's."

== Track listing ==
All tracks are written by Tom Petty, except where noted.

Side one
No.	Title	Writer(s)	Length
1.	"Jammin' Me"	Tom Petty; Bob Dylan; Mike Campbell	4:09
2.	"Runaway Trains"	Petty; Campbell	5:13
3.	"The Damage You've Done"		3:53
4.	"It'll All Work Out"		3:11
5.	"My Life/Your World"	Petty; Campbell	4:40

Side two
No.	Title	Writer(s)	Length
6.	"Think About Me"		3:45
7.	"All Mixed Up"	Petty; Campbell	3:42
8.	"A Self-Made Man"		3:02
9.	"Ain't Love Strange"		2:40
10.	"How Many More Days"		3:18
11.	"Let Me Up (I've Had Enough)"	Petty; Campbell	3:31

== Personnel ==
Tom Petty & The Heartbreakers

- Tom Petty – lead and backing vocals, guitars (acoustic, electric, 12-string, bass)
- Mike Campbell – lead guitars (12-string, electric, acoustic, bass, resonator, slide), koto, keyboards, dulcimer, mandolin, ukulele, percussion
- Benmont Tench – acoustic and electric pianos, Hammond and Vox organs, vibraphone, synthesizer
- Howie Epstein – bass guitar, backing vocals
- Stan Lynch – drums, percussion

Production

- Annalisa – photography
- Bruce Barris – assistant engineer
- Nick Basich – assistant engineer
- Mike Campbell – production, engineer
- Paul Chinn – photography
- Mark Desisto – assistant engineer
- Mick Haggerty – design, art
- Bob Ludwig – mastering
- Tom Petty – production
- Don Smith – engineer
- Mike Shipley – mixing
- Andy Udoff – assistant engineer
- Alan Weidel – assistant engineer
- Shelly Yakus – overdub engineer

== Charts ==
Chart performance for Let Me Up (I've Had Enough)
Chart (1987)	Peak Position
Australia (Kent Music Report)	63
New Zealand Albums (RMNZ)	23
Swedish Albums (Sverigetopplistan)	15
UK Albums (Official Charts)	59
US Billboard 200	20

== Certifications ==
Certifications for Let Me Up (I've Had Enough)
Region	Certification	Certified units/sales
United States (RIAA)	Gold	500,000^{^}
^{^} Shipments figures based on certification alone.
