= Into the Great Wide Open =

Studio album by Tom Petty and the Heartbreakers
- Released: July 2, 1991
- Recorded: 1990−91
- Studios: Rumbo Studio C (Canoga Park, California); M.C. Studios
- Genres: Heartland rock; roots rock
- Length: 43:55
- Label: MCA
- Producers: Jeff Lynne; Tom Petty; Mike Campbell

Tom Petty and the Heartbreakers chronology
Let Me Up (I've Had Enough) (1987)	Into the Great Wide Open (1991)	Greatest Hits (1993)

Tom Petty chronology
Full Moon Fever (1989)	Into the Great Wide Open (1991)	Greatest Hits (1993)

Singles from Into the Great Wide Open
- 1. "Learning to Fly" Released: June 17, 1991; 2. "Into the Great Wide Open" Released: September 9, 1991; 3. "Kings Highway" Released: January 1992 (UK); 4. "Too Good to Be True" Released: March 23, 1992 (UK/Ger); 5. "All or Nothin'" Released: 1992 (Germany); 6. "You and I Will Meet Again" Released: 1992 (Germany)

Into the Great Wide Open is the eighth studio album by American rock band Tom Petty and the Heartbreakers but ninth overall for Tom Petty. Released in July 1991, it was the band's last with MCA Records and the last with drummer Stan Lynch who left in 1994. The album was the second that Petty produced with Jeff Lynne, following the successful Full Moon Fever (1989).

Tom Petty and the Heartbreakers recorded the album in Studio C at Rumbo Recorders, which charged a rate of $600 per day. The studio was equipped with a 24-input Trident 80 B console and an Otari MTR90 MkII two-inch, 24-track machine.

"Learning to Fly", the first single from the album, spent six weeks at No. 1 on Billboard's Mainstream Rock Tracks chart, tying "The Waiting" (1981) for the band's longest run atop the chart. The album's second single, "Out in the Cold", also topped the Mainstream Rock chart, though for two weeks.

The music video for the title track stars Johnny Depp as "Eddie", who moves to Los Angeles as a teenager to seek rock stardom, and also features appearances by Gabrielle Anwar, Faye Dunaway, Matt LeBlanc, Terence Trent D'Arby, and Chynna Phillips.

== Artwork ==
Featured on the album's cover is the (slightly-cropped) painting Autumn Landscape (1921) by Czech artist Jan Matulka. The original is owned by the Los Angeles County Museum of Art.

== Singles ==
The album's first single, "Learning to Fly", was released on June 17, 1991, two weeks prior to the album, and was a substantial hit for Petty. The second single, the title track, was released just over two months after the album's release, and also became one of the band's biggest hits. Both songs were top 10 singles on various charts. Throughout 1992, four additional singles were released: "You and I Will Meet Again", "All or Nothin'", "Too Good to Be True", and "King's Highway".

== Critical reception ==
Professional ratings
Review scores
Source	Rating
AllMusic	3/5 stars
Blender	3/5 stars
Chicago Tribune	3/4 stars
The Encyclopedia of Popular Music	4/5 stars
Entertainment Weekly	B+
Los Angeles Times	3/5 stars
Music Story	3/5 stars
MusicHound Rock	2.5/5 stars
The New York Times	(favorable)
People	(favorable)
Q	4/5 stars
Rolling Stone	4/5 stars

Into the Great Wide Open was warmly received by critics. Dave DiMartino, reviewing the album for Entertainment Weekly, called it the closest thing to a "classic" album that Petty and the Heartbreakers had made in 15 years, and a return to the quality of their first two albums. He felt this was likely due to the involvement of Jeff Lynne, and commented that he felt the songs on Into the Great Wide Open are "obviously" better than those on Full Moon Fever, which had also been created in collaboration with Lynne. Rolling Stone critic Parke Puterbaugh said the album features Petty's best lyrics and is like a cross between Full Moon Fever and Damn the Torpedoes (1979), and much better than Let Me Up (I've Had Enough) (1987), the most recent album credited to Tom Petty and the Heartbreakers.

Stephen Thomas Erlewine of AllMusic was less impressed, calling the album "pleasant", but not Petty at his best, and saying that it sounds too much like Full Moon Fever. In his Consumer Guide, Robert Christgau gave the album a one-star honorable mention, which indicates a "worthy effort consumers attuned to its overriding aesthetic or individual vision may well like".

== Track listing ==
Side one
No.	Title	Writer(s)	Length
1.	"Learning to Fly"	Tom Petty; Jeff Lynne	4:02
2.	"Kings Highway"	Petty	3:08
3.	"Into the Great Wide Open"	Petty; Lynne	3:43
4.	"Two Gunslingers"	Petty	3:09
5.	"The Dark of the Sun"	Petty; Lynne	3:23
6.	"All or Nothin'"	Petty; Lynne; Mike Campbell	4:07

Side two
No.	Title	Writer(s)	Length
1.	"All the Wrong Reasons"	Petty; Lynne	3:46
2.	"Too Good to Be True"	Petty	3:59
3.	"Out in the Cold"	Petty; Lynne	3:40
4.	"You and I Will Meet Again"	Petty	3:42
5.	"Makin' Some Noise"	Petty; Lynne; Campbell	3:27
6.	"Built to Last"	Petty; Lynne	4:00
Total length:			43:55

=== Spoken interlude ===
As a tongue-in-cheek reference to the "Hello, CD Listeners" interlude on compact disc releases of Full Moon Fever, on cassette tape releases of this album there is a brief spoken interlude at the end of Side One. In it, Petty instructs cassette listeners how to properly flip over their tape and prepare it for Side Two. "Attention cassette listeners, you have now completed Side One. In order to hear Side Two, please fast forward to the end of the reel before turning the tape over. Thank you."

== Personnel ==
Tom Petty and the Heartbreakers

- Tom Petty – lead and backing vocals, rhythm guitars (acoustic, electric, 12-string), keyboards, percussion
- Mike Campbell – guitars (lead, 12-string, baritone, bass, resonator, slide), keyboards, bouzouki, mandolin, hammer dulcimer, backing vocals on "Learning to Fly"
- Benmont Tench – electric and upright pianos, accordion
- Howie Epstein – harmony and backing vocals, bass
- Stan Lynch – drums, percussion

Additional musicians

- Jeff Lynne – guitars, bass, backing vocals, piano, synthesizer, percussion, sound effects
- Roger McGuinn – backing vocals on "All The Wrong Reasons"
- Richard Tandy – synthesizer on "Two Gunslingers"

Additional personnel

- Jeff Lynne – producer
- Tom Petty – producer
- Mike Campbell – producer
- Richard Dodd – engineer

== Charts ==
=== Weekly charts ===
Weekly chart performance for Into the Great Wide Open
Chart (1991)	Peak position
Australian Albums (ARIA)	28
Austrian Albums (Ö3 Austria)	7
Canadian Albums (RPM)	4
Dutch Albums (Album Top 100)	53
German Albums (Offizielle Top 100)	8
Japanese Albums (Oricon)	96
New Zealand Albums (RMNZ)	12
Norwegian Albums (VG-lista)	5
Swedish Albums (Sverigetopplistan)	2
Swiss Albums (Schweizer Hitparade)	12
UK Albums (Official Charts)	3
US Billboard 200	13

=== Year-end charts ===
1991 annual chart performance for Into the Great Wide Open
Chart (1991)	Position
Canadian Albums (RPM)	21
German Albums (Offizielle Top 100)	53
US Billboard 200	71

1992 annual chart performance for Into the Great Wide Open
Chart (1992)	Position
German Albums (Offizielle Top 100)	90

== Certifications ==
Certifications for Into the Great Wide Open
Region	Certification	Certified units/sales
Canada (Music Canada)	2× Platinum	200,000^{^}
Germany (BVMI)	Gold	250,000^{^}
New Zealand (RMNZ)	Gold	7,500^{‡}
Sweden (GLF)	Platinum	100,000^{^}
Switzerland (IFPI Switzerland)	Gold	25,000^{^}
United Kingdom (BPI)	Gold	100,000^{^}
United States (RIAA)	2× Platinum	2,000,000^{^}
^{^} Shipments figures based on certification alone.^{‡} Sales+streaming figures based on certification alone.
