= The Dark of the Sun =

The Dark of the Sun may refer to:

- Dark of the Sun, a 1968 film
- The Dark of the Sun, a 1991 song by Tom Petty and the Heartbreakers from the album Into the Great Wide Open
