= Anything That's Rock 'n' Roll =

- German picture sleeve

Single by Tom Petty and the Heartbreakers

from the album Tom Petty and the Heartbreakers
- B-side: "Fooled Again (I Don't Like It) [from Official Live 'Leg] (UK/Germany); "Strangered in the Night" (Scandinavia); "Rockin' Around (with You)" (Spain); "Mystery Man" (South Africa)
- Released: May 27, 1977
- Recorded: 1976
- Studio: Shelter Studios, Hollywood
- Genre: Heartland rock; power pop
- Length: 2:23
- Label: Shelter
- Songwriter: Tom Petty
- Producer: Denny Cordell

Tom Petty and the Heartbreakers singles chronology
"American Girl" (1977)	"Anything That's Rock 'n' Roll" (1977)	"I Need to Know" (1978)

"Anything That's Rock 'n' Roll" is the second UK single from Tom Petty and the Heartbreakers' 1976 eponymous debut album. It was their first UK hit, peaking at #36 the week ending July 2, 1977. It was not released as a single in the United States.

The B-side "Fooled Again (I Don't Like It)" is a live version taken from The Official Live Bootleg.

A live version of the song, recorded on November 11, 1977, at Capitol Studios in Hollywood, was included on the 2018 box set An American Treasure.

== Charts ==
Chart (1977)	Peak position
UK Singles (Official Charts)	36
