= American Girl (Tom Petty and the Heartbreakers song) =

1976 rock song

Single by Tom Petty and the Heartbreakers

from the album Tom Petty and the Heartbreakers
- B-side: "Fooled Again (I Don't Like It)" (US); "The Wild One, Forever" (UK); "Luna (from Official Live 'Leg)" (UK reissue)
- Released: February 4, 1977 (US); July 29, 1977 (UK)
- Recorded: July 4, 1976
- Studio: Shelter Studios, Hollywood
- Genre: Power pop; jangle pop; pop rock; heartland rock; new wave
- Length: 3:35
- Label: Shelter
- Songwriter: Tom Petty
- Producer: Denny Cordell

Tom Petty and the Heartbreakers singles chronology
"Breakdown" (1976)	"American Girl" (1977)	"Anything That's Rock 'n' Roll" (1977)
"Mary Jane's Last Dance" (1993)	"American Girl" (reissue) (1994)	"You Don't Know How It Feels" (1994)

Audio video
- "American Girl" on YouTube

"American Girl" is a song written by American singer, songwriter, and guitarist Tom Petty and recorded by Tom Petty and the Heartbreakers for their eponymous debut album. It was released as a single on February 4, 1977 by Shelter Records and did not chart in the United States. In the UK, it was released as a single on July 29, snd peaked at No. 40 for the week ending August 27, 1977. It was re-released in 1994 as a single from Petty's Greatest Hits album and peaked at No. 68 on the US Cash Box Top 100.

Despite limited chart success, "American Girl" became one of Petty's most popular songs and a staple of classic rock. It has been consistently rated as his best song, only surpassed by "Free Fallin'" otherwise, and one of the best rock songs of all time, and has been called "more than a classic rock standard — it's practically part of the American literary canon." It has also been used in several movies and television shows, often during a scene in which a character, much like the protagonist in the song's lyrics, is "longing for something bigger than their current existence".

"American Girl" was the last song performed in concert by Tom Petty and the Heartbreakers. They played it to close out the encore of their performance on September 25, 2017, at the Hollywood Bowl in Los Angeles, California, the final concert of their 40th Anniversary Tour. Petty died of complications from cardiac arrest after an accidental prescription medication overdose on October 2, just over a week later.

It is ranked number 169 on Rolling Stone's list of The 500 Greatest Songs of All Time.

== Composition and recording ==
"American Girl" was written by Petty around the time he and the Heartbreakers signed their first recording contract. It was recorded on the 4th of July in 1976, the Bicentennial of the United States.

"American Girl" uses standard rock instrumentation of electric guitars, electric bass, drums, and keyboards. The tempo is fast and "urgent", and is built on a repeated jangling guitar riff based on a "Bo Diddley beat". As described in Rolling Stone, "The supercharged riff set the template for decades of Petty hits, but it was also an homage to the Byrds: Petty and Mike Campbell's twin guitars mirrored Roger McGuinn's 12-string, infusing the folk-rock sounds of the 1960s with New Wave energy."

=== Lyrics and rumors ===
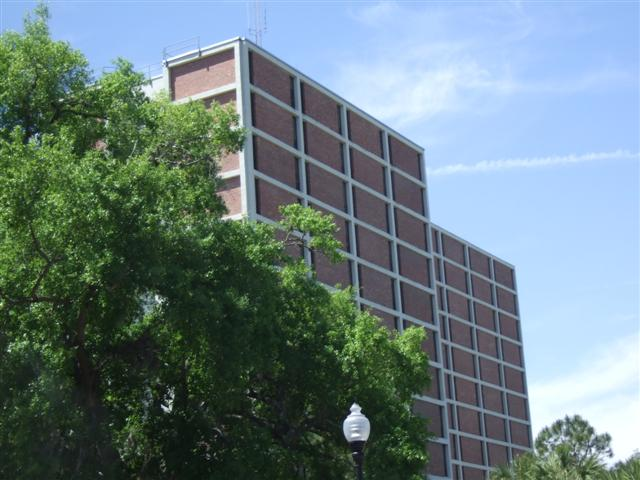
Beaty Towers on the University of Florida campus as seen from Route 441.

Due to lyrics about a desperate girl on a balcony hearing "cars roll by out on 441", the song has long been rumored to be about a college student who died by suicide by jumping from the Beaty Towers residence hall at the University of Florida (UF) in Gainesville. The 160 feet (49 m) dormitory is located on the edge of campus alongside U.S. Route 441 and opened in 1967, when Petty was a teenager living across town.

While the university did not historically keep records of on-campus suicides, a UF spokesman asserted that no one has died by jumping from Beaty Towers, which would be a difficult endeavor since the building has narrow unopenable windows but no balconies, and that Petty himself refuted the story when asked in person during a 2006 visit.

In the book Conversations with Tom Petty, the musician stated that the supposed tragic origin of the song was simply an urban legend:

It's become a huge urban myth down in Florida. That's just not at all true. The song has nothing to do with that. But that story really gets around... They've really got the whole story. I've even seen magazine articles about that story. "Is it true or isn't it true?" They could have just called me and found out it wasn't true.

In the same interview, Petty explained that he wrote the song while living in California:

I was living in an apartment where I was right by the freeway. And the cars would go by. In Encino, near Leon Russell's house. And I remember thinking that that sounded like the ocean to me. That was my ocean. My Malibu. Where I heard the waves crash, but it was just the cars going by. I think that must have inspired the lyric.

The opening line lyric "raised on promises" echoes a line of dialogue in Francis Ford Coppola's horror thriller film Dementia 13 (1963). Referring to another woman, the character Louise says (at minute 17), "Especially an American girl. You can tell she's been raised on promises."

== Single track listings ==
- "American Girl" b/w "Fooled Again (I Don't Like It)"
  Shelter 62007 (US)
- "American Girl" b/w "The Wild One, Forever"
  Shelter WIP6377 (UK)
- "American Girl" b/w "Luna" (Live) *
  Shelter WIP6403 (UK)
  * taken from The Official Live Bootleg

== Personnel ==
Tom Petty and the Heartbreakers

- Tom Petty – rhythm guitar (played in unison with Campbell), lead and backing vocals
- Mike Campbell – lead guitar, rhythm guitar (played in unison with Petty)
- Ron Blair – bass guitar
- Stan Lynch – drums
- Benmont Tench – piano, Hammond organ

with

- Phil Seymour – backing vocals

== Critical reception ==
"American Girl" is widely considered one of Petty's greatest works. The song was ranked number one on Billboard's list of Petty's 20 greatest songs and on Rolling Stone's list of Petty's 50 greatest songs. Cash Box said that it "rides along with a nice thump and an unusual, syncopated instrumental section." In June 2026, CBS News included the song in its list of the 250 essential American songs of the past 250 years.

== Charts ==
Original release

Chart (1977)	Peak position
UK Singles (OCC)	40

Reissue

Chart (1994)	Peak position
US Bubbling Under Hot 100 (Billboard)	9
US Cash Box Top 100	68

2017

Chart (2017)	Peak position
US Rock Digital Song Sales (Billboard)	9

== Certifications ==
Region	Certification	Certified units/sales
New Zealand (RMNZ)	Platinum	30,000^{‡}
United Kingdom (BPI) Sales since 2004	Gold	400,000^{‡}
^{‡} Sales+streaming figures based on certification alone.

== Dierks Bentley version ==
"American Girl"

Single by Dierks Bentley

from the album Petty Country: A Country Music Celebration of Tom Petty
- Released: February 23, 2024
- Genre: Country; bluegrass
- Length: 3:03
- Label: Valory; Capitol Nashville
- Songwriter: Tom Petty
- Producer: Jon Randall

Dierks Bentley singles chronology
"Something Real" (2023)	"American Girl" (2024)	"She Hates Me" (2025)

American country music artist Dierks Bentley released a version of the song on February 23, 2024, as the first single from the compilation album Petty Country: A Country Music Celebration of Tom Petty (2024). It was produced by Jon Randall.

=== Music video ===
The video was directed by Wes Edwards and was released on March 21, 2024.

=== Commercial performance ===
"American Girl" debuted at number 25 on the Country Airplay chart for the week ending March 9, 2024, and reached a peak of number 22 on the chart in November.

=== Charts ===
Chart (2024)	Peak position
Canada Country (Billboard)	38
US Country Airplay (Billboard)	22
US Hot Country Songs (Billboard)	49

== In popular culture ==
Tom Petty and the Heartbreakers performed the song on the BBC2 television show The Old Grey Whistle Test in 1978.

"American Girl" is featured in several movies including Fast Times at Ridgemont High (1982), The Silence of the Lambs (1991), and One Battle After Another (2025).

According to Petty, The Strokes have admitted to taking the riff for their 2001 single "Last Nite" from this song. In a 2006 interview with Rolling Stone magazine, Petty said, "The Strokes took 'American Girl', and I saw an interview with them where they actually admitted it. That made me laugh out loud. I was like, 'OK, good for you.' It doesn't bother me." The Strokes played as an opening act for Tom Petty and the Heartbreakers for several dates of their 2006 tour.

== Cover versions ==
Roger McGuinn of The Byrds (a major influence on Petty's music), released his own version of "American Girl" on his Thunderbyrd LP in 1977. The similarity between Petty's record and The Byrds' musical style was so strong that when his manager first played "American Girl" for him, McGuinn asked "When did I write that song?"

"American Girl" has also been covered by various other artists including: The Killers, The Shins, Jason Isbell, Green Day, Elle King, Taylor Swift, Goo Goo Dolls and Pearl Jam.

== All album appearances ==
- Tom Petty and the Heartbreakers
- Pack Up the Plantation: Live!
- Greatest Hits
- Playback
- Anthology: Through the Years
- Runnin' Down a Dream
- The Live Anthology
- Mojo Tour 2010 (Live Version)

== See also ==
- 1977 in music
