= Into the Great Wide Open (song) =

1991 single by Tom Petty and the Heartbreakers

Single by Tom Petty and the Heartbreakers

from the album Into the Great Wide Open
- B-side: "Makin' Some Noise"
- Released: September 9, 1991
- Genre: Rock; heartland rock
- Length: 3:45; 6:41 (music video version)
- Label: MCA
- Songwriters: Tom Petty; Jeff Lynne
- Producers: Tom Petty; Jeff Lynne

Tom Petty and the Heartbreakers singles chronology
"Learning to Fly" (1991)	"Into the Great Wide Open" (1991)	"Peace in L.A." (1992)

Music video
- "Into the Great Wide Open" on YouTube

"Into the Great Wide Open" is a song by American rock band Tom Petty and the Heartbreakers, included as the third track on their eighth studio album, Into the Great Wide Open (1991). Released as a single in September 1991, the song reached number four on the US Billboard Album Rock Tracks chart but stalled at number 92 on the Billboard Hot 100. Internationally, the song peaked at number 23 on the Canadian RPM 100 Hit Tracks chart and found moderate success in Belgium and Germany.

== Music video ==
=== Background ===
The music video for the single, directed by Julien Temple, stars Johnny Depp as the protagonist, Eddie Rebel, as well as Gabrielle Anwar as Eddie's girlfriend and Faye Dunaway as his manager, and features cameos by Terence Trent D'Arby, Chynna Phillips, and Matt LeBlanc. The video was shot during the filming of Arizona Dream, in which both Depp and Dunaway starred, which was on hiatus as its director Emir Kusturica had suffered a nervous breakdown. The song was extended in order to include more of the 18 minutes of footage Temple had created.

Tom Petty appears in the video playing multiple roles, including the narrator, the tattoo artist, Eddie's roadie Bart and a reporter. The other members of the Heartbreakers are also given cameos throughout the video. Lead guitarist Mike Campbell helps present the award to Eddie toward the end of the video, keyboardist Benmont Tench portrays Eddie's record producer, bassist Howie Epstein portrays a motorcycle dealer, and drummer Stan Lynch portrays the doorman who refuses to let Eddie's manager into the red carpet event. Petty's manager Tony Dimitriades is also given a cameo as the record label A&R man who signs Eddie into a recording contract. Petty later commented that it was "one of the only times I've ever felt fulfilled by a video. I even had people coming to me wanting to make it into a movie."

Dunaway, Petty, and several members of the Heartbreakers have a connection to Gainesville, Florida; Dunaway studied at the University of Florida (but did not graduate from that school), and the musical band originated in -- and both Petty and Benmont Tench were born in -- that city.

=== Synopsis ===
Fresh out of high school, Eddie catches a bus to Hollywood and meets a girl (Anwar) who has a tattoo to match his: a heart impaled with a stiletto knife. They move into a motel-style apartment building. Eddie works as a doorman while his girlfriend teaches him to play guitar. Their landlady (Dunaway) turns out to be a cross between a fairy godmother and a svengali, managing his increasing success as a rock star.

Success quickly goes to Eddie's head. Things come to a peak when he excludes his manager from a red carpet event. Infuriated, she waves her magic wand (in the form of a cigarette holder) and breaks the spell, with disastrous results. Vanity Flaire magazine reports that Eddie's girlfriend is pregnant. He appears drunk and belligerent at an awards ceremony, then acts up during a music video shoot. Eddie's career quickly fizzles, his girlfriend leaves him, and the heart in his tattoo fades away. The story closes with Eddie returning to the tattoo parlor, where he finds a newcomer (LeBlanc) getting the same tattoo from a new artist (Depp). Petty then closes the video with the classic fairy tale ending, sardonically, that "they all lived happily ever after".

== Track listings ==
7-inch and cassette single

A. "Into the Great Wide Open" – 3:42
B. "Makin' Some Noise" – 3:25

UK CD single

1. "Into the Great Wide Open" – 3:40
2. "Makin' Some Noise" – 3:23
3. "Strangered in the Night" – 3:28
4. "Listen to Her Heart" – 3:01

European 7-inch single

1. "Into the Great Wide Open" – 3:42
2. "I Need to Know" – 2:23

European 12-inch and CD single

1. "Into the Great Wide Open" – 3:42
2. "I Need to Know" – 2:23
3. "Breakdown" – 2:42

== Charts ==
Chart (1991)	Peak position
Australia (ARIA)	112
Belgium (Ultratop 50 Flanders)	48
Canada Top Singles (RPM)	23
Germany (GfK)	54
UK Airplay (Music Week)	58
US Billboard Hot 100	92
US Mainstream Rock (Billboard)	4

== Certification ==
Region	Certification	Certified units/sales
New Zealand (RMNZ)	Gold	15,000^{‡}
^{‡} Sales+streaming figures based on certification alone.

== Release history ==
Region	Date	Format(s)	Label(s)	Ref.
United Kingdom	September 9, 1991	7-inch vinyl; CD; cassette	MCA	
Australia	September 23, 1991	12-inch vinyl; CD; cassette	MCA	
