= A Face in the Crowd (Tom Petty song) =

Single by Tom Petty

from the album Full Moon Fever
- B-side: "A Mind with a Heart of Its Own"
- Released: February 1990
- Genre: Heartland rock
- Length: 3:58
- Label: MCA
- Songwriters: Tom Petty; Jeff Lynne
- Producers: Jeff Lynne; Tom Petty; Mike Campbell

Tom Petty singles chronology
"Free Fallin'" (1989)	"A Face in the Crowd" (1990)	"Yer So Bad" (1990)

"A Face in the Crowd" is a song co-written and recorded by Tom Petty. It was released in February 1990 as the fourth single from his first solo album Full Moon Fever (1989). It peaked at number 46 on the U.S. Billboard Hot 100 chart.

== Content ==
The narrator discusses falling in love with someone who used to be just "a face in the crowd."

== Other performances ==
Kathleen Edwards released a version of the song on the Sweetheart: Love Songs covers compilation in 2004.

Josh Klinghoffer, formerly of the Red Hot Chili Peppers, briefly performed the song at the band's October 7, 2017, show in tribute to Petty, who had died five days earlier.

A cover of the song by Spoon was released in March 2021.

== Charts ==
Chart (1990)	Peak position
U.S. Billboard Hot 100	46
U.S. Billboard Album Rock Tracks	5
Canadian RPM Top Singles	20
Dutch Singles Chart	25
UK Singles (OCC)	93
