= Full Moon Fever =

Studio album by Tom Petty
- Released: April 24, 1989
- Recorded: 1987–88
- Studios: M.C.; Rumbo (Los Angeles); Sunset Sound (Hollywood); Devonshire (Hollywood); Conway (Hollywood); Sound City (Los Angeles)
- Genres: Heartland rock; roots rock
- Length: 39:58
- Label: MCA
- Producers: Jeff Lynne; Tom Petty; Mike Campbell

Tom Petty chronology
Let Me Up (I've Had Enough) (1987)	Full Moon Fever (1989)	Into the Great Wide Open (1991)

Singles from Full Moon Fever
- 1. "I Won't Back Down" Released: April 1989; 2. "Runnin' Down a Dream" Released: July 29, 1989; 3. "Free Fallin'" Released: October 27, 1989; 4. "A Face in the Crowd" Released: March 3, 1990; 5. "Yer So Bad" Released: April 23, 1990

Full Moon Fever is the debut solo studio album by American musician Tom Petty, released on April 24, 1989, by MCA Records. It features contributions from members of his band the Heartbreakers, notably Mike Campbell, as well as from Jeff Lynne, Roy Orbison (who died prior to its release), and George Harrison, three of Petty's bandmates in the Traveling Wilburys. The record showcases Petty exploring his musical roots with nods to his influences. The songwriting primarily consists of collaborations between Petty and Lynne, who was also a producer on the album. Full Moon Fever became a commercial and critical success, peaking at No. 3 on the U.S. Billboard 200 and being certified 5× platinum in the United States and 6× platinum in Canada.

MCA Records under Irving Azoff originally refused to issue the album, believing it did not contain any hits. Azoff resigned within a few months and, with new label management reviewing the album positively, they decided to release it. In 2019, the album was inducted into the Grammy Hall of Fame. Rolling Stone magazine ranked the album number 298 on its 2020 list of the "500 Greatest Albums of all Time".

== Background and recording ==
Having earlier in 1987 finished a Heartbreakers tour behind the album Let Me Up (I've Had Enough), Petty decided to record a solo album without the Heartbreakers (similar to the arrangement between Bruce Springsteen and The E Street Band at the time). This stirred some controversy among members of the Heartbreakers, although all but drummer Stan Lynch contributed to the album. Benmont Tench and Howie Epstein initially were not happy about playing the Full Moon Fever songs live during Heartbreakers concerts. Lynch hated playing them right up until his departure from the band, saying it made him feel like he was in a cover band.

The recording process in 1988 was a low-key affair, with many of Petty's friends contributing, including the members of the Traveling Wilburys, except for Bob Dylan. Recorded mainly in the relaxed atmosphere of Mike Campbell's garage studio, Petty would later say it was the most enjoyable record of his career. Recording of Full Moon Fever was actually interrupted to allow time for recording of the first Wilburys' album. Two songs recorded during the sessions did not make the Full Moon Fever album. "Down the Line" and "Don't Treat Me Like a Stranger" were released as B-sides. During the sessions, Petty wrote "Indiana Girl", an early draft of what would eventually become "Mary Jane's Last Dance".

== Musical style and themes ==
The album is noted for being heavily influenced by Jeff Lynne, resulting in a cleaner and glossier version of the Heartbreakers' roots rock from previous albums. Lynne incorporated layers of keyboards and backing vocals, giving it a Beatlesque feel. The songs show Petty paying dues to his influences with a Byrds cover ("Feel a Whole Lot Better") and a nod to Del Shannon in "Runnin' Down a Dream". Other songs, such as "Free Fallin'", show Petty addressing nostalgia on his rise to fame. "A Mind with a Heart of Its Own" uses a Bo Diddley-style rhythm, while "The Apartment Song" features an instrumental break with paradiddle drumming reminiscent of Buddy Holly's "Peggy Sue".

== Release and reception ==
Professional ratings
Review scores
Source	Rating
AllMusic	4.5/5 stars
Blender	4/5 stars
Chicago Tribune	3.5/4 stars
Los Angeles Times	3/5 stars
Mojo	4/5 stars
NME	8/10
Pitchfork	8.1/10
Rolling Stone	3.5/5 stars
Uncut	9/10
The Village Voice	B+

The album, which became Petty's commercial peak as an artist, was helped by favorable critical reviews and three hit singles. The album was released on April 24, 1989, and rose to eventually peak at No. 3 on the U.S. Billboard 200 and No. 8 in the UK. Five singles were released from the album; two hit the top 20 of the U.S. Billboard Hot 100 and three topped the U.S. Mainstream Rock chart. The RIAA certified Full Moon Fever 5× platinum on October 5, 2000, in the US and the CRIA certified it 6× platinum on September 18, 1991, in Canada.

Critical praise was generally high. Rolling Stone compared the album favorably to the Traveling Wilburys' debut, Traveling Wilburys Vol. 1, saying it has the "same restless charm", but commenting that Full Moon Fever at times seems "sprawling". The review claims the album is "another rewarding, low-key side project for Petty", giving it three-and-a-half stars out of five. The Boston Globe noted that "some Petty fans might find this album to be a kind of cruise control, but its sheer unpretentiousness and crisp, non-doctored sound make it irresistible." The Orlando Sentinel opined that "Lynne's production is sometimes a little too clean, and there's nothing earthshaking or innovative going on... But when was the last time you picked up an album this solid: tough, pretty, good rockin', no filler?" Ultimate Classic Rock wrote, "By all measures, Petty’s first solo effort, Full Moon Fever, was an unequivocal success."

AllMusic gave the album four and a half stars out of five in a retrospective review, admiring the craft of the album and rivaling it with the Heartbreakers' Damn the Torpedoes. This review notes there are no weak tracks on the album, calling it a "minor masterpiece". The 2004 Rolling Stone Album Guide called Full Moon Fever a "masterful solo album". Michael Hann of Uncut characterises it as "a '70s rock'n'roller at last successfully capturing the best of '80s pop, which is perhaps why Full Moon Fever remains a touchstone whenever a young band wants to get the sound of '80s AOR down pat." It was ranked number 92 on Rolling Stone's list of the 100 best albums of the 1980s, and was ranked number 298 in the 2020 update of the magazine's list of the 500 greatest albums of all time. In 2000. it was voted number 534 in Colin Larkin's All Time Top 1000 Albums.

== Track listing ==
All tracks are written by Tom Petty and Jeff Lynne, except where noted.

Side one
No.	Title	Writer(s)	Length
1.	"Free Fallin'"		4:14
2.	"I Won't Back Down"		2:56
3.	"Love Is a Long Road"	Petty; Mike Campbell	4:06
4.	"A Face in the Crowd"		3:58
5.	"Runnin' Down a Dream"	Petty; Lynne; Campbell	4:23

Side two
No.	Title	Writer(s)	Length
6.	"Feel a Whole Lot Better"	Gene Clark	2:47
7.	"Yer So Bad"		3:05
8.	"Depending on You"	Petty	2:47
9.	"The Apartment Song"	Petty	2:31
10.	"Alright for Now"	Petty	2:00
11.	"A Mind with a Heart of Its Own"		3:29
12.	"Zombie Zoo"		2:56

=== "Hello, CD listeners ..." ===
The original compact disc release of the album contains a hidden track in the pregap of Track 6 ("Feel a Whole Lot Better"), at the point where cassette or LP listeners would have to flip sides to continue. The track consists of a brief tongue-in-cheek monologue by Petty, over a background of barnyard noises (credited to Del Shannon). The interlude is not included in the vinyl or cassette versions of the album; it is referred to as "Attention CD Listeners" in the CD liner notes. On some later CD and digital releases, it is added to the end of "Runnin' Down a Dream", rather than the beginning of "Feel a Whole Lot Better".

Hello, CD listeners. We've come to the point in this album where those listening on cassette, or records, will have to stand up, or sit down, and turn over the record, or tape. In fairness to those listeners, we'll now take a few seconds before we begin Side Two. Thank you. Here's Side Two.

=== Notes ===
- Some US limited edition promo CDs included a bonus live performance of the track "Free Fallin'"

== Personnel ==
- Tom Petty – lead and backing vocals, 6- and 12-string acoustic and electric guitars, keyboards, tambourine, handclaps, barnyard noises in the "Hello, CD listeners ..." interlude
- Mike Campbell – 6- and 12-string electric lead guitars, mandolin, bass guitar, slide guitar, Dobro, keyboards
- Jeff Lynne – bass guitar, acoustic rhythm guitar, guitar synthesizer, keyboards, backing vocals, handclaps, barnyard noises in the "Hello, CD listeners ..." interlude
- Phil Jones – drums, percussion

Additional musicians

- George Harrison – acoustic guitar and backing vocals on "I Won't Back Down"
- Jim Keltner – drums, maracas and tambourine on "Love Is a Long Road"
- Howie Epstein – backing vocals on "I Won't Back Down" and "Love Is a Long Road"
- Benmont Tench – piano on "The Apartment Song"
- Roy Orbison – backing vocals on "Zombie Zoo"
- Kelsey Campbell – scream on "Zombie Zoo"
- Alan Weidel – handclaps on "Feel a Whole Lot Better"
- barnyard noises in the "Hello, CD listeners ..." interlude credited to Del Shannon

Production

- Produced by Jeff Lynne with Tom Petty and Mike Campbell
- Engineers: Mike Campbell, Don Smith, and Bill Bottrell; Dennis Kirk on "Love Is a Long Road"
- Assistant engineer: Alan "Bugs" Weidel
- Mastered by Steve Hall
- Art Production: Awest

== Charts ==
=== Weekly charts ===
Weekly sales chart performance for Full Moon Fever
Chart (1989–1990)	Position
Australian ARIA Albums Chart	13
Canada Top Albums/CDs (RPM)	2
Dutch Mega Albums Chart	62
German Media Control Albums Chart	41
New Zealand Albums Chart	5
Norwegian VG-lista Albums Chart	2
Swedish Albums Chart	2
UK Albums Chart	8
US Billboard 200	3

=== Year-end charts ===
1989 annual sales chart performance for Full Moon Fever
Chart (1989)	Position
Canadian Albums Chart	7
European Albums Chart	100
US Billboard 200	19

1990 annual sales chart performance for Full Moon Fever
Chart (1990)	Position
Canadian Albums Chart	52
New Zealand Albums Chart	48
US Billboard 200	22

2017 annual sales chart performance for Full Moon Fever
Chart (2017)	Peak position
UK Albums Chart	74

=== Singles ===
Sales chart performance for singles from Full Moon Fever
Year	Single					
Year	Single	CB Top 100	BB Hot 100	BB Mainstream Rock Tracks	BB Modern Rock Tracks	BB Adult Contemporary
1989	"I Won't Back Down"	11	12	1	29	
1989	"Runnin' Down a Dream"	22	23	1		
1989	"Free Fallin'"	6	7	1		17
1989	"Feel a Whole Lot Better"			18		
1989	"Love Is a Long Road"			7		
1990	"A Face in the Crowd"	42	46	5		
1990	"Yer So Bad"			5		

== Certifications and sales ==
Certifications and sales for Full Moon Fever
Region	Certification	Certified units/sales
Australia	—	75,000
Canada (Music Canada)	6× Platinum	600,000^{^}
Sweden (GLF)	Gold	50,000^{^}
United Kingdom (BPI)	Gold	100,000^{^}
United States (RIAA)	5× Platinum	5,000,000^{^}
^{^} Shipments figures based on certification alone.
