= Love Is a Long Road (song) =

Single by Tom Petty

from the album Full Moon Fever
- A-side: "Free Fallin'" (UK); "Yer So Bad" (US)
- Released: April 24, 1989 (Full Moon Fever)
- Recorded: 1987–1988
- Genre: Rock; power pop
- Length: 4:07
- Label: MCA
- Songwriters: Tom Petty; Mike Campbell
- Producers: Tom Petty; Jeff Lynne; Mike Campbell

"Love Is a Long Road" is a song by Tom Petty from his 1989 first solo album Full Moon Fever. Although only released as the B-side to "Free Fallin'" in the UK and "Yer So Bad" in the US, and not released as a stand-alone single, it received a fair amount of radio airplay. In the U.S., it peaked at No. 7 on the Billboard Album Rock Tracks chart.

== Background ==
The rock song was co-written by guitarist Mike Campbell, who was inspired by a motorcycle he owned. The musician said "I was really into that frame of mind. This feels like a motorcycle shifting gears." "Love Is a Long Road" appears on the 2000 double-disc compilation album Anthology: Through the Years, as well as on the 1995 box set Playback.

== Critical reception ==
AllMusic's Matthew Greenwald describes the song as sounding like a stripped-down version of the Who's classics "Baba O'Riley" and "Won't Get Fooled Again", and one of the most powerful rockers on the album. Rolling Stone ranked the song at No. 38 in a list of Petty's 50 greatest songs.

== Media usage ==
In 2023, the song was used in the first trailer for the video game Grand Theft Auto VI. It led to a 36,979% increase in streams on Spotify, skyrocketing from less than 5 million to nearly 40 million streams within a span of a few months.

== Charts ==
1989 chart performance for "Love Is a Long Road"
Chart (1989)	Peak position
US Album Rock Tracks (Billboard)	7

2023 chart performance for "Love Is a Long Road"
Chart (2023)	Peak position
US Rock Digital Song Sales (Billboard)	7
