= Make It Better (Forget About Me) =

Single by Tom Petty and the Heartbreakers

from the album Southern Accents
- B-side: "Cracking Up"
- Released: June 3, 1985
- Recorded: 1984
- Genre: Rock
- Length: 4:23
- Label: MCA
- Songwriters: Tom Petty; David A. Stewart
- Producers: Tom Petty; David A. Stewart; Jimmy Iovine

Tom Petty and the Heartbreakers singles chronology
"Rebels" (1985)	"Make It Better (Forget About Me)" (1985)	"Needles and Pins" (1985)

"Make It Better (Forget About Me)" is a song written by Tom Petty of Tom Petty and the Heartbreakers and David A. Stewart of Eurythmics. It was released in June 1985 as the third single from Tom Petty and the Heartbreakers' 1985 album Southern Accents.

Musically, it is an uptempo number that pays tribute to the Memphis Soul style, with heavy emphasis on horns and funk-inspired rhythm guitar. The music video continues in the Alice in Wonderland motif of "Don't Come Around Here No More" (again featuring Louise Foley) and riffs on the "model annoyed by flying insect with the face of the singer superimposed" as in the then-recent "You Might Think" video by The Cars.

Cash Box said it is the Petty's and Stewart's "full-blown shot at R&B" and that it has "Memphis horns, soulful backing vocals and an irresistible dance beat." Billboard called it "jittery, uptempo, horn-based Memphis soul."

== Personnel ==
Tom Petty and the Heartbreakers

- Tom Petty – lead vocals
- Mike Campbell – guitars
- Benmont Tench – keyboards
- Howie Epstein – bass guitar
- Stan Lynch – drums

Additional musicians

- David A. Stewart – guitar
- Malcolm 'Molly' Duncan – saxophone
- Clydene Jackson – backing vocals
- Phil Jones – tambourine
- Dave Plews – trumpet
- Stephanie Spruill – backing vocals
- Julia Tillman Waters – backing vocals
- Maxine Willard Waters – backing vocals

== Chart performance ==
Chart (1985)	Peak position
Canadian RPM Top Singles	73
U.S. Billboard Hot 100	54
U.S. Billboard Album Rock Tracks	12
