= Yer So Bad =

Single by Tom Petty

Single by Tom Petty

from the album Full Moon Fever
- B-side: Love Is a Long Road (US); "A Mind with a Heart of Its Own" (UK); "Free Fallin'" (Live) (UK 12")
- Released: April 23, 1990; June 1, 1990 (UK)
- Genre: Folk rock; rockabilly; skiffle
- Length: 3:05
- Label: MCA
- Songwriters: Tom Petty; Jeff Lynne
- Producers: Tom Petty; Jeff Lynne; Mike Campbell

Tom Petty singles chronology
| "A Face in the Crowd" (1990) | "Yer So Bad" (1990) | "Learning to Fly" (1991) |

Music video
- "Yer So Bad" on YouTube

"Yer So Bad" is a song co-written and recorded by Tom Petty. It was released in 1990 as the fifth single from his first solo album Full Moon Fever (1989).

== Background and composition ==
"Yer So Bad" was the first song that Petty wrote with Jeff Lynne, with whom he was a member of the Traveling Wilburys. Lynne would go on to produce the entire Full Moon Fever album. As Petty recalled in Paul Zollo's book Conversations with Tom Petty, he had written all the lyrics but could not work out how the chorus would sound. "[Lynne] showed me this little part," he said. "E minor to C, and said, 'You could do this.' And I said, 'That's great!' And I was so elated, because I had been working on the song for days, and I couldn't get from the verse to the chorus somehow. And he showed me this little bit, and I said, 'Great! Will you produce this?'"

It tells from the singer's viewpoint about his greedy sister being lucky enough to marry a yuppie, then got divorced and took the yuppie for all he was worth in the proceedings and is now a swinger dating another singer while her ex-husband is unable to find a new partner, is possibly bankrupt and is contemplating suicide ("head in the oven"). In both verses, the singing brother of the sister cannot decide which is worse but is sure what happened to his ex-brother in law won't ever happen to him because the singer has "you to save me" and that "in a world gone mad, yer so bad".

== Music video ==
In the music video for this song, the sister and yuppie (played by Charles Rocket) are shown at their wedding reception with Petty as the photographer, then dissolves to two sheriff deputies hauling the resisting husband out of their marital house while he tries unsuccessfully to take as many possessions that he can to his car that he drives off in and dissolves to a National Enquirer-type newspaper with a front-page article about it in bold print block letters called "CHEATING HUSBAND'S HEAD EXPLODES", then later dissolves to a bar where the wife, apparently a singer herself, is laughing and flirting with the band's drummer, who later goes home with her to the former yuppie couple's luxurious spacious house. The expelled husband, after driving down the freeway, checks into a cheap motel across town where he opens a metal briefcase revealing a blow up doll that he is inflating as his new artificial "companion". A construction scene appears with a new house being built and a construction worker wearing a T-shirt that says "DIE YUPPIE SCUM" while sumo-like men are shown dancing on the house's construction site, each carrying a 12-inch LaserDisc in their hands. The video later dissolves to the ex-husband driving in his convertible with his blow-up doll next to him in the front seat, trying to keep it seated in heavy traffic, and ends by showing him walking down the street carrying the doll in public. The video was directed by Julien Temple, who directed Rocket in Earth Girls Are Easy.

== Reception ==
"Yer So Bad" was named one of Petty's 50 best songs by Rolling Stone magazine, calling it "Petty at his most caustically hilarious."

=== Charts ===
| Chart (1990) | Peak position |
|---|---|
| Canadian RPM Top Singles | 44 |
| US Billboard Album Rock Tracks | 5 |
