= Here Comes My Girl =

Single by Tom Petty and the Heartbreakers

from the album Damn the Torpedoes
- B-side: "Louisiana Rain"
- Released: April 7, 1980
- Recorded: 1979
- Genre: Folk rock; heartland rock; R&B; talking blues
- Length: 3:52 (single version); 4:27 (album version)
- Label: Backstreet
- Songwriters: Tom Petty; Mike Campbell
- Producers: Tom Petty; Jimmy Iovine

Tom Petty and the Heartbreakers singles chronology
"Refugee" (1980)	"Here Comes My Girl" (1980)	"Even the Losers" (1980)

Music video
- "Here Comes My Girl" on YouTube

"Here Comes My Girl" is a song written by American rock band Tom Petty and the Heartbreakers, their third single from their breakthrough hit 1979 album, Damn the Torpedoes. It peaked at number 59 on the U.S. Billboard Hot 100 on May 24, 1980.

== Background and recording ==
In a November 2003 interview with Songfacts, guitarist Mike Campbell explained the story behind "Here Comes My Girl":

It's very similar to "Refugee" - those two were written the same week. I made some demos and Tom liked those two. "Here Comes My Girl" was interesting because we had the chorus and Tom wasn't sure how to do the verse, he kept trying to sing it different ways and he finally came across sort of half-talking it, and that's when the song seemed to come to life.

Petty remembers Campbell's chords and tune on a cassette tape, and struggling with the lyrics. Bassist Ron Blair told Petty that what he had was a "really good piece of music." Petty learned to use narration in the verses, similar to Blondie or The Shangri-Las. Petty said the chorus was inspired by The Byrds.

== Composition ==
Written by Tom Petty and Mike Campbell in E major, "Here Comes My Girl" is set in common time and played at a moderate tempo of 114 beats per minute. The song follows a verse–pre-chorus–chorus structure with a quiet-loud dynamic as Petty's vocals range from E4 to F♯5. The verses feature a talking blues style reminiscent of Bob Dylan, with spoken-word vocals from Petty and a simple, two-chord pattern from Campbell: A major and B/A. The B/A is played by sliding an A major chord shape up two frets while keeping the open A string ringing as a bass note. The choruses then transition into folky heartland rock that is more typical of the band, as Petty sings over the major chords E – A – E – A, followed by F♯m – B.

"Here Comes My Girl" has been described as a folk rock song, adding "some twists to the band's jangle-pop arsenal," according to Eric Harvey of Pitchfork. Petty had previously disassociated himself from the punk rock movement, but in "Here Comes My Girl", he shares bands like Mink DeVille's fondness for "'50s throwback." The verses in particular have Petty "sing-talking" in the role of a "worn-down iteration of DeVille’s streetcorner hustler archetype." He then switches to a "dead-on imitation of Roger McGuinn" in the chorus, with Matthew Greenwald of AllMusic summarizing the song as "a melodic combination of hard R&B and Byrds-inspired folk" because of this.

== Critical reception ==
Cash Box called it a "truly excellent single" with a "convincingly honest narrative intro" and a "Byrds-like hook." Record World called it a "raging ballad" and said that Petty's "tough talk/sing vocal swells into a pretty hook."

== Track listings ==
American 7" single (MCA-41227)

1. "Here Comes My Girl" (single edit) - 3:52
2. "Louisiana Rain" - 4:27

British 7" single (MCA 539)

1. "Here Comes My Girl" - 3:55
2. "Don't Bring Me Down" (Live in Boston, 1978; later included on Pack Up the Plantation: Live!) - 3:47

British 12" single (MCAT 539)

1. "Here Comes My Girl" (album version) - 4:21
2. "Casa Dega" (non-album track) - 3:31
3. "Don't Bring Me Down" (see above) - 3:45

== Music video ==
The music video was directed by John Goodhue and was released in April 1980.

== Personnel ==
- Tom Petty – lead vocals, rhythm guitar
- Mike Campbell – lead guitar
- Ron Blair – bass guitar
- Stan Lynch – drums, backing vocals
- Benmont Tench – piano, organ

== Charts ==
Chart (1980)	Peak position
Canadian RPM Top Singles	82
New Zealand Singles Chart	41
U.S. Billboard Hot 100	59

== Cover versions ==
- In 2009, Matthew Sweet and Susanna Hoffs covered the song for their cover album, Under the Covers, Vol. 2.
- In 2011, Relient K covered the song for their cover album, Is for Karaoke.
