= Southern Accents =

Studio album by Tom Petty and the Heartbreakers
- Released: March 26, 1985
- Recorded: 1983–1985
- Studios: Sound City, Village Recorder, Sunset Sound (all in Los Angeles); Church (London)
- Genres: Heartland rock; Southern rock
- Length: 39:54
- Label: MCA
- Producers: Mike Campbell; Jimmy Iovine; Tom Petty; Robbie Robertson; David A. Stewart

Tom Petty and the Heartbreakers chronology
Long After Dark (1982)	Southern Accents (1985)	Pack Up the Plantation: Live! (1985)

Singles from Southern Accents
- 1. "Don't Come Around Here No More" Released: February 28, 1985; 2. "Rebels"/"Southern Accents" Released: March 25, 1985; 3. "Make It Better (Forget About Me)" Released: June 3, 1985

Southern Accents is the sixth studio album by American rock band Tom Petty and the Heartbreakers, released on March 26, 1985, through MCA Records. The album's lead single, "Don't Come Around Here No More", co-written by Dave Stewart of Eurythmics, peaked at No. 13 on the Billboard Hot 100. The song "Southern Accents" was later covered by Johnny Cash for his Unchained album in 1996.

== Background ==
Originally conceived as a concept album, the theme of Southern Accents became somewhat murky with the inclusion of three songs co-written by Stewart, and several others originally planned for the album left off. Songs cut from the track list include "Trailer", "Crackin' Up" (a Nick Lowe cover), "Big Boss Man" (a Jimmy Reed cover), "The Image of Me" (a Conway Twitty cover), "Walkin' from the Fire", and "The Apartment Song". The first two were released as B-sides, while the two remaining covers (and a demo version of "The Apartment Song") were later released on the Playback box set. A studio version of "The Apartment Song" appeared on Petty's first solo album, Full Moon Fever, released in 1989. "Trailer" was later re-recorded and released in May 2016 by Petty's other band Mudcrutch, on its second studio album, 2. "Walkin' from the Fire" was eventually released on the posthumous box set An American Treasure in 2018. The song "My Life/Your World" from Let Me Up (I've Had Enough) included several of the song's lyrics rewritten.

While mixing the album's opening track, "Rebels", Petty became frustrated and punched a wall, severely breaking his left hand. Subsequent surgery on his hand left him with several pins, wires and screws holding his hand together.

The album cover features an 1865 painting by Winslow Homer titled The Veteran in a New Field.

The album would prove to be the last album to have any involvement of bassist Ron Blair until 2002.

== Critical reception ==
Professional ratings
Review scores
Source	Rating
AllMusic	3/5 stars
Blender	3/5 stars
Chicago Tribune	2/4 stars
Christgau's Record Guide	B−
The Encyclopedia of Popular Music	4/5 stars
The Essential Rock Discography	6/10
MusicHound Rock	4/5 stars
Rolling Stone	(favorable)
The Rolling Stone Album Guide	4/5 stars

Robert Palmer of The New York Times praised Southern Accents as "the most adventurous and musically accomplished album of the band's career." He later included it in his list of the year's ten best albums, ranking it at No. 5 and calling it "an exquisitely crafted reassessment of personal and geographical roots by an established group that probably includes the finest American musicians playing the stadium circuit."

Southern Accents was later hailed in The Rolling Stone Album Guide as a "breakthrough" and "Petty's best record...backed up with rock & roll of nearly the sweep and ease of the Stones' Exile on Main Street."

In a retrospective review, Stephen Thomas Erlewine of AllMusic commented that while "occasionally, the songs work" and "Don't Come Around Here No More" and "Make It Better (Forget About Me)" expand [the band's] sound nicely", the record was too often "weighed down by its own ambitions".

In the Los Angeles Review of Books, Connor Goodwin said the album is "deeply embedded in nostalgia for the Lost Cause."

== Track listing ==
All tracks are written by Tom Petty, except where noted.

Side one
No.	Title	Writer(s)	Length
1.	"Rebels"		5:21
2.	"It Ain't Nothin' to Me"	Tom Petty; Dave Stewart	5:12
3.	"Don't Come Around Here No More"	Petty; Stewart	5:07
4.	"Southern Accents"		4:44

Side two
No.	Title	Writer(s)	Length
5.	"Make It Better (Forget About Me)"	Petty; Stewart	4:23
6.	"Spike"		3:33
7.	"Dogs on the Run"	Petty; Mike Campbell	3:40
8.	"Mary's New Car"		3:47
9.	"The Best of Everything"		4:03
Total length:			39:54

== Personnel ==
Tom Petty and the Heartbreakers

- Tom Petty – lead vocals (all tracks), electric guitar (tracks 2, 9), acoustic guitar (track 6), 12-string guitar (1, 7), tambourine (track 2), piano (tracks 3, 4), OBX drum machine (track 8), producer
- Mike Campbell – electric guitar (tracks 1–3, 5, 7–9), Dobro (track 4), slide guitar (track 6), bass guitar (track 1), keyboards (tracks 1–2), keyboard bass (track 3), piano (track 8), backing vocals (track 2), producer
- Benmont Tench – keyboards (tracks 1, 5, 7, 9), piano (tracks 2, 4), string synthesizer (track 3), electric piano (track 6), vibraphone (track 8), backing vocals (track 1)
- Howie Epstein – bass guitar (tracks 3, 5–8), backing vocals (tracks 1–3, 7, 8), harmony vocals (4, 6, 8)
- Stan Lynch – drums (all tracks), percussion (tracks 3, 4, 8), backing vocals (track 1)

Additional musicians

- David A. Stewart – bass guitar (track 2), electric guitar (tracks 2, 5), backing vocals (tracks 2, 3), sitar (track 3), synthesizer (track 3), producer
- Bobbye Hall – tambourine (tracks 1, 7)
- The Heart Attack Horns – horns (tracks 1, 7)
- Malcolm 'Molly' Duncan – saxophone (tracks 1, 5)
- Greg Smith – baritone saxophone (track 2)
- William Bergman – tenor saxophone (track 2)
- John Berry Jr. – horns (track 2)
- Rick Braun – trumpet (track 2)
- Jim Coile – tenor saxophone (track 2)
- Marilyn Martin – backing vocals (track 3)
- Daniel Rothmuller – cello (track 3)
- Sharon Celani – backing vocals (track 3)
- Dean Garcia – bass guitar (track 3)
- Jack Nitzsche – string arrangement (track 4)
- Clydene Jackson – backing vocals (track 5)
- Phil Jones – tambourine (track 5)
- Dave Plews – trumpet (track 5)
- Stephanie Spruill – backing vocals (track 5)
- Julia Tillman Waters – backing vocals (track 5)
- Maxine Willard Waters – backing vocals (track 5)
- Marty Jourard – saxophones (track 8)
- Jerry Hey – horn conductor (track 9)
- Garth Hudson – keyboards (track 9)
- Jim Keltner – percussion (track 9)
- Richard Manuel – harmony vocals (track 9)
- Ron Blair – bass guitar (track 9)

Production and design

- Jimmy Iovine – producer
- Robbie Robertson – producer
- David Bianco – engineer
- Joel Fein – engineer
- Don Smith – engineer, remixing
- Alan "Bugs" Weidel – engineer
- Shelly Yakus – engineer, remixing
- Stephen Marcussen – mastering
- Winslow Homer – artwork, cover painting
- Dennis Keeley – photography
- Steve Breitborde – photography
- Steele Works – design, cover design
- Tommy Steele – art direction, design, cover design

== Charts ==
=== Weekly charts ===
Weekly chart performance for Southern Accents
Chart (1985)	Peak position
New Zealand Albums (RMNZ)	25
Swedish Albums (Sverigetopplistan)	10
UK Albums (Official Charts)	23
US Billboard 200	7

== Certifications ==
Certifications for Southern Accents
Region	Certification	Certified units/sales
United States (RIAA)	Platinum	1,000,000^{^}
^{^} Shipments figures based on certification alone.
