= Official Live 'Leg =

Live album by Tom Petty and the Heartbreakers
- Released: April 1977
- Recorded: December 12, 1976
- Venue: Paul's Mall, Boston
- Genre: Rock
- Length: 21:24
- Label: Shelter

Tom Petty and the Heartbreakers chronology
Tom Petty and the Heartbreakers (1976)	Official Live 'Leg (1977)	You're Gonna Get It! (1978)

LP label
- Shelter TP-12677

Official Live 'Leg (also known as The Official Live Bootleg) is a one-sided live promotional LP by Tom Petty and the Heartbreakers issued by Shelter Records in 1977. It was recorded at one of the band's earliest gigs, opening for Al Kooper at Paul's Mall in Boston on December 12, 1976. A remastered vinyl version was included in the deluxe edition of The Live Anthology box set.

== Track listing ==
All songs written by Tom Petty, except "Jaguar and Thunderbird" written by Chuck Berry.

U.S. version (Shelter/ABC TP-12677):

1. "Jaguar and Thunderbird" – 2:28
2. "Fooled Again (I Don't Like It)" – 5:17
3. "Luna" – 4:17
4. "Dog on the Run" – 9:22

U.K. version (Shelter/Island IDJ-24):

1. "Jaguar and Thunderbird" – 2:28
2. "Fooled Again (I Don't Like It)" – 5:17
3. "The Wild One, Forever" – 4:40
4. "Luna" – 4:17
5. "Dog on the Run" – 9:22

== Musicians ==
- Tom Petty – guitar, vocals, keyboards on "Luna"
- Mike Campbell – lead guitar
- Benmont Tench – keyboards, backing vocals
- Ron Blair – electric bass guitar
- Stan Lynch – drums, backing vocals

== Counterfeit version ==
Counterfeit LP label

A counterfeit version that replicates the original album cover but is made to look like a white label promo has been in circulation since the early 1980s.
