= Hard Promises =

Studio album by Tom Petty and the Heartbreakers
- Released: May 5, 1981
- Recorded: 1980–81
- Studios: Sound City (Van Nuys); Cherokee (Hollywood); Goodnight (Los Angeles)
- Genres: Heartland rock; power pop
- Length: 39:33
- Label: Backstreet
- Producers: Jimmy Iovine; Tom Petty

Tom Petty and the Heartbreakers chronology
Damn the Torpedoes (1979)	Hard Promises (1981)	Long After Dark (1982)

Singles from Hard Promises
- 1. "The Waiting" / "Nightwatchman" Released: April 20, 1981; 2. "A Woman in Love (It's Not Me)" Released: June 29, 1981; 3. "Something Big" / "Letting You Go" Released: 1981 (New Zealand only)

Professional ratings
Review scores
Source	Rating
AllMusic	4.5/5 stars
Blender	4/5 stars
Chicago Tribune	2.5/4 stars
Christgau's Record Guide	B
The Encyclopedia of Popular Music	4/5 stars
The Essential Rock Discography	6/10
MusicHound Rock	5/5 stars
Music Story	4.5/5 stars
Rolling Stone	(favorable)
The Rolling Stone Album Guide	3/5 stars

Hard Promises is the fourth studio album by Tom Petty and the Heartbreakers released on May 5, 1981, on Backstreet Records.

== History ==
Its working title was Benmont's Revenge, referring to keyboard player Benmont Tench. The album features guest vocals from Stevie Nicks of Fleetwood Mac on the duet "Insider". The Heartbreakers also recorded the hit "Stop Draggin' My Heart Around" for Nicks' album Bella Donna around the time Hard Promises was recorded.

This was the second Tom Petty album on the Backstreet Records label. The album's release was delayed while Petty and his distributor MCA Records argued about the list price. The album was slated to be the next MCA release with the new list price of $9.98, following Steely Dan's Gaucho and the Olivia Newton-John/Electric Light Orchestra Xanadu soundtrack. This so-called "superstar pricing" was $1.00 more than the usual list price of $8.98. Petty voiced his objections to the price hike in the press and the issue became a popular cause among music fans. Non-delivery of the album or naming it Eight Ninety-Eight were considered, but eventually MCA decided against the price increase. The final title comes from a line in the chorus of "Insider."

Hard Promises is the last full album to feature the original Heartbreakers lineup, as bassist Ron Blair left after the album's release. He returned on Mojo, and he would make guest appearances on Long After Dark and Southern Accents and, after rejoining the band in 2002, played on select tracks on The Last DJ. He was replaced by Howie Epstein, who continued to play until his removal in 2002 due to deteriorating health.

In 2000 it was voted number 968 in Colin Larkin's All Time Top 1000 Albums.

=== John Lennon tribute ===
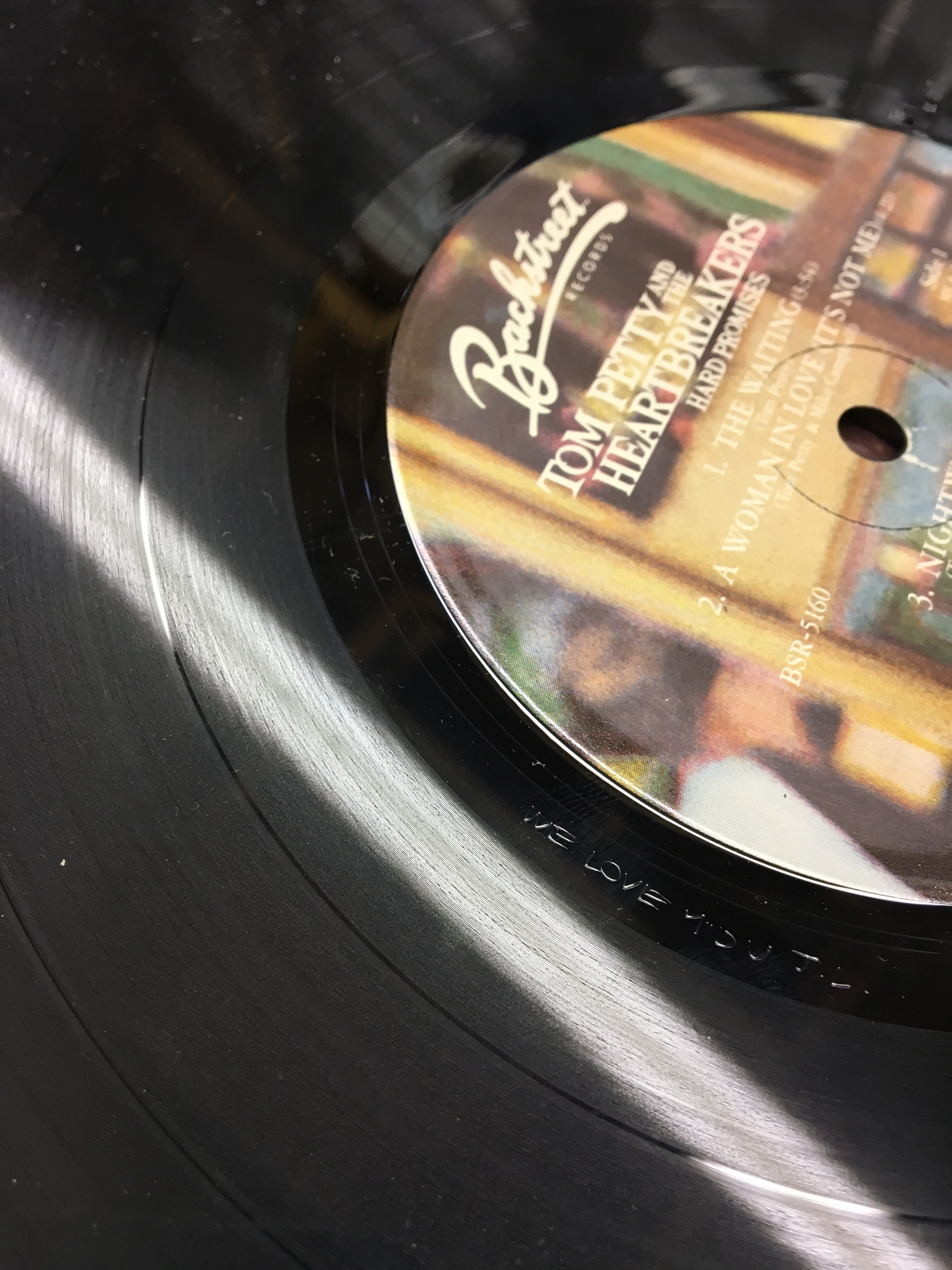
Album etch tribute to John Lennon

During the recording of the album, John Lennon was scheduled to be in the same studio at the same time. Petty was looking forward to meeting him when he came in. The meeting never occurred, as Lennon was murdered before the date of his planned visit to the studio. Petty and the band paid tribute to the slain former Beatle by etching "WE LOVE YOU J.L." in the runout deadwax on early U.S. and Canadian pressings of Hard Promises.

== Track listing ==
All tracks are written by Tom Petty, except where noted.

Side one
No.	Title	Writer(s)	Length
1.	"The Waiting"		3:58
2.	"A Woman in Love (It's Not Me)"	Tom Petty; Mike Campbell	4:22
3.	"Nightwatchman"	Petty; Campbell	3:59
4.	"Something Big"		4:44
5.	"Kings Road"		3:27

Side two
No.	Title	Writer(s)	Length
6.	"Letting You Go"		3:24
7.	"A Thing About You"		3:33
8.	"Insider"		4:23
9.	"The Criminal Kind"		4:00
10.	"You Can Still Change Your Mind"	Petty; Campbell	4:15
Total length:			39:33

== Personnel ==
Tom Petty & the Heartbreakers

- Tom Petty – lead and backing vocals, guitar (acoustic; 12 and 6-string electric), bass and electric piano on "Something Big"
- Mike Campbell – guitars (acoustic, electric, 12-string), bass, auto-harp, accordion, harmonium
- Benmont Tench – organ, piano, backing vocals
- Ron Blair – bass guitar
- Stan Lynch – drums, backing vocals

Additional musicians

- Stevie Nicks – backing vocals on "Insider" and "You Can Still Change Your Mind"
- Lori Nicks – backing vocals on "Insider"
- Sharon Celani – backing vocals on "You Can Still Change Your Mind"
- Donald Dunn – bass guitar on "A Woman in Love"
- Phil Jones – percussion
- Alan "Bugs" Weidel – piano on "Nightwatchman"

Production

- Brad Gilderman – assistant engineer
- Jimmy Iovine – producer
- Tom Petty – producer
- Tori Swenson – assistant engineer
- Shelly Yakus – engineer

== Charts ==
=== Weekly charts ===
Weekly chart performance for Hard Promises
Chart	Position
Australian Albums Chart	21
Canadian RPM Albums Chart	3
New Zealand Albums Chart	1
Swedish Albums Chart	22
UK Albums Chart	32
United States Billboard 200	5

=== Year-end charts ===
Annual chart performance for Hard Promises
Chart (1981)	Position
Canadian Albums Chart	28
New Zealand Albums (RMNZ)	27
US Billboard Pop Albums	49

== Certifications ==
Certifications for Hard Promises
Region	Certification	Certified units/sales
Australia (ARIA)	Gold	20,000^{^}
Canada (Music Canada)	Platinum	100,000^{^}
United States (RIAA)	Platinum	1,000,000^{^}
^{^} Shipments figures based on certification alone.
