= Southern Accents (song) =

Single by Tom Petty and the Heartbreakers

from the album Southern Accents
- A-side: "Rebels"
- Released: 1985
- Genre: Heartland rock
- Length: 4:44
- Label: MCA
- Songwriter: Tom Petty
- Producers: Tom Petty; Mike Campbell

"Southern Accents" is the fourth track from the Tom Petty and the Heartbreakers album of the same name. The song was also released as the B-side to "Rebels" and it was included on the compilation The Best of Everything.

== Recording ==
While this song was recorded there was tension between the bandmates, each having a different vision for what the final versions of the song and the album would sound like. It was during the recording sessions for this album that Petty broke his hand after punching a wall out of frustration. The song, along with the rest of the album was recorded at Sound City Studios in Los Angeles, California.

== Reception ==
The song was met with generally positive reviews from several major sources such as Rolling Stone, which called it "a fierce defense of his Southern roots and an ambitious fight for his creative honor." Most reviews for the whole album specifically mentioned this song as a highlight.

== Live performances ==
The song was included on the 1985 live album Pack Up the Plantation: Live!.

It was also included on the 2009 collection The Live Anthology and in the 2018 posthumous collection An American Treasure. The featured performance is from the band's Gainesville, Florida, show on September 21, 2006.

== History ==
Petty said: "That may be my favorite among my songs – just in terms of a piece of pure writing. I remember writing it very vividly. It was in the middle of the night and I was playing it on the piano at home in Encino. I was just singing into my cassette recorder and suddenly these words came out." Petty also mentioned his mother, Katherine, who died in 1980 in the song, and stated he didn't go to her funeral because of his hatred for funerals and because his presence would have raised a commotion.

== Personnel ==
Tom Petty & the Heartbreakers

- Tom Petty – lead vocal, piano
- Mike Campbell – Dobro
- Benmont Tench – piano
- Howie Epstein – backing vocal
- Stan Lynch – percussion

Additional personnel

- Jack Nitzsche – string arrangement

== Notable covers ==
- Dolly Parton released a cover of the song in April 2024, in advance of the compilation album Petty Country: A Country Music Celebration of Tom Petty.
