= Rebels (song) =

Single by Tom Petty and the Heartbreakers

from the album Southern Accents
- B-side: "Southern Accents"
- Released: March 25, 1985
- Recorded: 1984
- Genre: Heartland rock
- Length: 5:21 (album version); 4:12 (single version)
- Label: MCA
- Songwriter: Tom Petty

Tom Petty and the Heartbreakers singles chronology
"Don't Come Around Here No More" (1985)	"Rebels" (1985)	"Make It Better (Forget About Me)" (1985)

"Rebels" is a song by Tom Petty and the Heartbreakers. It appeared on the 1985 album Southern Accents and was released as a single in the same year. Although it only reached #74 on the Billboard Hot 100 pop chart, it fared much better on the Billboard Album Rock Tracks chart, where it peaked at #5.

== "Rebels" and Petty's broken hand ==
The track was recorded in 1984. It was during the recording of this track that Petty broke his hand. Petty remembers being so high on drugs that he could not get an arrangement he liked. Petty went into the control room, and put the original demo tape on, which featured just him and a Rickenbacker 12-string guitar. He believed that they had yet to record an arrangement better than this demo, which made him so furious that he stormed up the stairs into his house, and punched the wall, causing severe damage to his left hand. After taking time off for his hand to heal, Petty called Jimmy Iovine in to help him finish "Rebels" along with some other tracks on Southern Accents. Alan "Bugs" Weidel, Tom's roadie, considers "Rebels" a least favorite of his due to Petty's broken hand.

== Reception ==
Cash Box said that it's "another strong outing from Petty And The Heartbreakers" and highlighted "Petty’s urgent vocal and lyrics of alienation."

== Personnel ==
Tom Petty & the Heartbreakers

- Tom Petty – 12-string guitar, lead vocals
- Mike Campbell – guitars, bass, keyboards
- Benmont Tench – keyboards, backing vocals
- Stan Lynch – drums, backing vocals
- Howie Epstein – backing vocals

Additional musicians

- William Bergman – horn, tenor saxophone, backing vocals
- John Berry Jr. – trumpet, horn
- Dick Braun – trumpet, horn, backing vocals
- Jim Coile – horn, tenor saxophone, backing vocals
- Kurt McGettrick – horn, backing vocals
- Molly Duncan – saxophone
- Dave Plews – trumpet
- Bobbye Hall – percussion

== Cover versions ==
The Drive-By Truckers released a cover version of Rebels on their compilation The Fine Print: A Collection of Oddities and Rarities in 2009. It was featured in the King of the Hill episode "The Redneck on Rainey Street" (Season 8, Episode 21 - aired May 16, 2004.

== Charts ==
Chart (1985)	Peak position
U.S. Billboard Album Rock Tracks	5
U.S. Billboard Hot 100	75
