= Runnin' Down a Dream =

Single by Tom Petty

from the album Full Moon Fever
- B-side: "Alright for Now"; "Down the Line"
- Released: July 29, 1989
- Genre: Heartland rock; garage rock
- Length: 4:25
- Label: MCA
- Songwriters: Tom Petty; Jeff Lynne; Mike Campbell
- Producers: Jeff Lynne; Tom Petty; Mike Campbell

Tom Petty singles chronology
"I Won't Back Down" (1989)	"Runnin' Down a Dream" (1989)	"Free Fallin'" (1989)

"Runnin' Down a Dream" is a song co-written and recorded by Tom Petty. It was released in July 1989 as the second single from his first solo album Full Moon Fever. "Runnin' Down a Dream" achieved reasonable chart success, reaching number 23 both in Canada and on the US Billboard Hot 100 and the top of the Billboard Album Rock Tracks chart. It has since garnered significant airplay on classic rock stations, and lent its name to the 2007 documentary on Tom Petty and the Heartbreakers.

== Lyrics and music ==
The song was co-written by Mike Campbell, along with Petty and Jeff Lynne. It was a nod to Petty's musical roots, with the lyric "me and Del were singin' 'Little Runaway'" making reference to Del Shannon and "Runaway".

The song uses E major as a tonic, but makes ample use of chords outside that key, such as D, G, and C major chords. The repeating fuzz guitar riff, using the notes B, B♭, A, G, and E, lacks only a D to complete the hexatonic E blues scale.

The guitar solo that closes out the song, played by Campbell, is nearly two full minutes long and was recorded in one take.

== Music video ==
The music video for "Runnin' Down a Dream", directed by Jim Lenahan and animated by Pittsburgh-based companies Allan & Wilson Animation Studio and Anivision Ltd., featured animation, based loosely on the classic comic strip Little Nemo in Slumberland and the animation How a Mosquito Operates, both by Winsor McCay. The video features a drawing style reminiscent of McCay's and showing Petty and a character who resembles Flip travelling through Slumberland. The 1933 film King Kong is also briefly referenced when Petty, atop the Chrysler Building, attempts to swat at attacking oversized mosquitoes, much like Kong swatting at the biplanes in the film.

== Charts ==
Chart (1989)	Peak position
Australia ARIA Singles Chart	68
Canada Top Singles (RPM)	23
UK Singles (Official Charts)	55
US Mainstream Rock (Billboard)	1
US Billboard Hot 100	23

== Certifications ==
Certifications for "Runnin' Down a Dream"
Region	Certification	Certified units/sales
New Zealand (RMNZ)	2× Platinum	60,000^{‡}
United Kingdom (BPI)	Silver	200,000^{‡}
^{‡} Sales+streaming figures based on certification alone.

== In popular culture ==
It was the official theme song of the 2006 NBA Finals as well as the 2008 NBA Finals. The song was also used by ABC in the 2010 NBA Finals when the presentation of the game reached the end of the third quarter and was phased out into a commercial break. The song was featured in Grand Theft Auto: San Andreas on the in-game classic rock station K-DST. The song is playable in Guitar Hero 5 and was released as downloadable content for Rock Band 2; in Guitar Hero 5 the master track is used.

It closed Petty and the Heartbreakers' performance at the February 2008 Super Bowl XLII Halftime Show, and featured a guitar solo by Mike Campbell. The next morning, the song was used during Super Bowl highlights on ESPN. It was also used in promotional segments of the 2008 MLB World Series.

In 2011, the song was included in Tom Hanks's film Larry Crowne and on its soundtrack. In the animated television series King of the Hill episode "Arlen City Bomber", Lucky Kleinschmidt (voiced by Tom Petty) says "I'm gonna help you run down that dream, Bobby" of getting Bobby a freshly made corn chip off the production line. The song was used in the Family Guy episode "The Book of Joe" when Brian achieves his "runner's high".

In 2017 after Petty's death, NBC used the song for the promo for its telecast of the Monster Energy NASCAR Cup Series Championship Race at Homestead-Miami Speedway. NBC began using a version of this song as their theme for NASCAR on NBC in the summer of 2018, replacing "Bringing Back the Sunshine" by Blake Shelton. This song is covered by ZZ Ward. The song was also featured on the opening montage of ON Video Skateboarding Issue #1 Summer 2000.

In 2025, the song was featured in the King of the Hill revival episode "The Beer Story".
