= Tom Petty and the Heartbreakers (album) =

Studio album by Tom Petty and the Heartbreakers
- Released: November 9, 1976
- Recorded: 1976
- Studio: Shelter (Hollywood)
- Genre: Rock and roll
- Length: 30:38
- Label: Shelter
- Producer: Denny Cordell

Tom Petty and the Heartbreakers chronology
Tom Petty and the Heartbreakers (1976)	You're Gonna Get It! (1978)

Singles from Tom Petty and the Heartbreakers
- 1. "Breakdown" Released: December 30, 1976; 2. "American Girl" Released: February 4, 1977; 3. "Anything That's Rock 'n' Roll" Released: May 27, 1977 (UK only); 4. "Rockin' Around (With You)" Released: August 1977 (Germany only)

Tom Petty and the Heartbreakers is the debut studio album by the American rock band Tom Petty and the Heartbreakers, released on November 9, 1976, by Shelter Records. The album was recorded and mixed at the Shelter Studio in Hollywood, California.

== Release and promotion ==
The album received little attention on its release in the United States. It climbed to No. 24 on the UK albums chart following a British tour, and the single "Anything That's Rock 'n' Roll" became a hit in the UK. After nearly a year and many positive reviews, the album reached the U.S. charts, where it peaked at No. 55 in 1978 and eventually went Gold.

"Breakdown" was released as the lead single and cracked the Top 40 in the U.S. and "American Girl" became one of the band's signature songs.

== Critical reception ==
Professional ratings
Review scores
Source	Rating
AllMusic	4.5/5 stars
Blender	4/5 stars
Chicago Tribune	3.5/4 stars
Christgau's Record Guide	B+
The Daily Vault	A−
The Essential Rock Discography	6/10
MusicHound Rock	3/5 stars
Pitchfork	7.0/10
The Rolling Stone Album Guide	3.5/5 stars
Sounds	5/5 stars

Reviewing in Christgau's Record Guide: Rock Albums of the Seventies (1981), Robert Christgau said, "Addicts of updated nostalgia and rock and roll readymades should find this a sly and authentic commentary on the evolving dilemma of Harold Teen. The songs are cute, the riffs executed with more dynamism than usual, and the singing attractively phlegmy. And like they say at the end of other cartoons, that's all, folks." The album was included in the book 1001 Albums You Must Hear Before You Die.

== Track listing ==
All tracks are written by Tom Petty, except "Rockin' Around (With You)" co-written with Mike Campbell.

Side one
No.	Title	Length
1.	"Rockin' Around (With You)"	2:28
2.	"Breakdown"	2:42
3.	"Hometown Blues"	2:13
4.	"The Wild One, Forever"	3:01
5.	"Anything That's Rock 'n' Roll"	2:23

Side two
No.	Title	Length
6.	"Strangered in the Night"	3:32
7.	"Fooled Again (I Don't Like It)"	3:48
8.	"Mystery Man"	3:01
9.	"Luna"	3:57
10.	"American Girl"	3:33

== Personnel ==
Tom Petty and the Heartbreakers

- Tom Petty – vocals, electric guitar, acoustic guitar, Hammond organ on track 9
- Mike Campbell – electric guitar, acoustic guitar
- Benmont Tench – piano, Hammond organ
- Ron Blair – bass guitar on tracks 1–2, 4–5, 7–10, cello on track 4
- Stan Lynch – drums on tracks 1–2, 4–5, 7–10, synthesizer on track 9

Additional musicians

- Jeff Jourard – electric guitar on tracks 2, 6–8
- Donald "Duck" Dunn – bass guitar on track 3
- Emory Gordy – bass guitar on track 6
- Randall Marsh – drums on track 3
- Jim Gordon – drums on track 6
- Noah Shark – maracas, tambourine, sleigh bells
- Charlie Souza – saxophone on track 3
- Phil Seymour – backing vocals on tracks 2, 10
- Dwight Twilley – backing vocals on track 6

== Charts ==
Chart performance for Tom Petty and the Heartbreakers
Chart (1976–80)	Peak Position
Australia (Kent Music Report)	57
Canada Top Albums/CDs (RPM)	81
New Zealand Albums (RMNZ)	18
UK Albums (Official Charts)	24
US Billboard 200	55

== Certifications ==
Certifications for Tom Petty and the Heartbreakers
Region	Certification	Certified units/sales
United States (RIAA)	Gold	500,000^{^}
^{^} Shipments figures based on certification alone.
