= Learning to Fly (Tom Petty and the Heartbreakers song) =

1991 single by Tom Petty and the Heartbreakers

Single by Tom Petty and the Heartbreakers

from the album Into the Great Wide Open
- B-side: "Too Good to Be True"
- Released: June 17, 1991
- Genre: Heartland rock; country rock; jangle pop
- Length: 4:05
- Label: MCA
- Songwriters: Tom Petty; Jeff Lynne
- Producers: Tom Petty; Jeff Lynne

Tom Petty and the Heartbreakers singles chronology
"Yer So Bad" (1990)	"Learning to Fly" (1991)	"Into the Great Wide Open" (1991)

Music video
- "Learning to Fly" on YouTube

"Learning to Fly" is a song by American rock band Tom Petty and the Heartbreakers. It was written in 1991 by Tom Petty and his writing partner Jeff Lynne for the band's eighth studio album, Into the Great Wide Open (1991). The entire song is based on four simple chords, (F, C, A minor, and G). Released in June 1991 by MCA Records, it became a hit for Petty and the Heartbreakers, topping the US Billboard Album Rock Tracks chart and peaking at number 28 on the Billboard Hot 100.

== Release ==
"Learning to Fly" was released as the first single from Into the Great Wide Open and reached number 28 on the US Billboard Hot 100 chart. It also became his most successful single on the Billboard Album Rock Tracks chart, reaching number one and remaining there for six weeks. The song was released in the United Kingdom on June 17, 1991, debuting at number 65 on the UK Singles Chart six days later. It rose to its peak of number 46 the following week and stayed on the UK chart for two more weeks before leaving the top 75.

== Track listing ==
- 7-inch vinyl

A. "Learning to Fly"
B. "Too Good to Be True"

== Personnel ==
Personnel are sourced from Sound on Sound.

Tom Petty and the Heartbreakers

- Tom Petty – lead and backing vocals, acoustic guitar
- Mike Campbell – 12-string electric guitar, electric and acoustic guitars, backing vocals
- Howie Epstein – backing vocals
- Stan Lynch – drums (w/o kick drum)

Others

- Jeff Lynne – Oberheim OB-Xa synthesizer, acoustic guitar, bass guitar, Oberheim DMX drum machine, sampler, backing vocals

== Charts ==
=== Weekly charts ===
Chart (1991)	Peak position
Australia (ARIA)	44
Canada Top Singles (RPM)	5
Europe (European Hit Radio)	15
Germany (GfK)	31
New Zealand (Recorded Music NZ)	28
Sweden (Sverigetopplistan)	35
Switzerland (Schweizer Hitparade)	75
UK Singles (Official Charts)	46
UK Airplay (Music Week)	37
US Billboard Hot 100	28
US Adult Contemporary (Billboard)	36
US Mainstream Rock (Billboard)	1
US Cash Box Top 100	35

2025 weekly chart performance for "Learning to Fly"
Chart (2025)	Peak position
Israel International Airplay (Media Forest)	18

=== Year-end charts ===
Chart (1991)	Position
Canada Top Singles (RPM)	46
Europe (European Hit Radio)	100
US Album Rock Tracks (Billboard)	10

== Certifications ==
Region	Certification	Certified units/sales
New Zealand (RMNZ)	3× Platinum	90,000^{‡}
United Kingdom (BPI)	Silver	200,000^{‡}
^{‡} Sales+streaming figures based on certification alone.

== Release history ==
Region	Date	Format(s)	Label(s)	Ref.
Europe	June 11, 1991	Radio	MCA	
United Kingdom	June 17, 1991	7-inch vinyl; CD1; cassette	MCA	
United Kingdom	June 24, 1991	CD2	MCA	
Australia	July 1, 1991	7-inch vinyl; 12-inch vinyl; CD; cassette	MCA	

== Cover version ==
Petty's Traveling Wilburys bandmate Bob Dylan covered the song live in concert in Broomfield, Colorado, on October 21, 2017, one day after what would have been Petty's 67th birthday.
