= Breakdown (Tom Petty and the Heartbreakers song) =

1976 single by Tom Petty and the Heartbreakers

- German picture sleeve

Single by Tom Petty and the Heartbreakers

from the album Tom Petty and the Heartbreakers
- B-side: "The Wild One, Forever" (US, 1976); "Fooled Again (I Don't Like It)" (US, 1977); "Luna" (Germany); "Strangered in the Night" (Spain)
- Released: December 30, 1976
- Recorded: 1976
- Studio: Shelter Studios (Hollywood)
- Genre: Heartland rock; pop rock; soul; R&B
- Length: 2:42
- Label: Shelter
- Songwriter: Tom Petty
- Producer: Denny Cordell

Tom Petty and the Heartbreakers singles chronology
"Breakdown" (1976)	"American Girl" (1977)

"Breakdown" is the debut single by American rock band Tom Petty and the Heartbreakers. It became a top 40 hit in the United States and Canada.

Played live, Petty sometimes incorporated "Breakdown" with Ray Charles's "Hit the Road Jack". A live recording of this variation appears on The Live Anthology.

== Background ==
"Breakdown" was a song written and recorded for the band's debut album. Initially, the song had lead guitarist Mike Campbell with a distinct guitar lick being played only near the end of the song. While playing it back one night, Tom Petty and Dwight Twilley, a bandmate of Phil Seymour, were in the studio, and Twilley enjoyed it. He suggested that the lick should be used throughout the song, and Petty obliged. At 2 AM, he gathered the Heartbreakers to join him in re-recording the song. Their final take was seven to eight minutes long, but it was pared down to 2 minutes and 39 seconds on the album. Guests on the song's recording include guitarist Jeff Jourard, a common collaborator with the band in their early days, and Phil Seymour, who sings backing vocals.

== Reception ==
Record World called it a "slow, sultry rocker, dominated by guitar, with Petty's distinctive vocal again standing out."

== Track listing ==
- 7" single (US, 1976)

A. "Breakdown" – 2:39
B. "The Wild One, Forever" – 3:01

- 7" single (US, 1977)

A. "Breakdown" – 2:39
B. "Fooled Again (I Don't Like It)" – 3:54

- 7" single (Germany, 1977)

A. "Breakdown" – 2:42
B. "Luna" – 3:59

- 7" single (Spain, 1978)

A. "Breakdown" – 2:42
B. "Strangered in the Night" – 3:32

== Charts ==
Chart (1977–1978)	Peak position
Australian Charts (Kent Music Report)	59
Canada RPM Top Singles	40
US Billboard Hot 100	40
US Cash Box Top 100	33
US Record World Singles	37

== Certification ==
Region	Certification	Certified units/sales
New Zealand (RMNZ)	Gold	15,000^{‡}
^{‡} Sales+streaming figures based on certification alone.

== Grace Jones version ==
"Breakdown"

Single by Grace Jones

from the album Warm Leatherette
- B-side: "Warm Leatherette"
- Released: October 1980
- Genre: Reggae
- Length: 5:30 (album/12" version); 3:00 (single version)
- Label: Island
- Songwriter: Tom Petty
- Producers: Chris Blackwell; Alex Sadkin

Grace Jones singles chronology
"The Hunter Gets Captured by the Game" (1980)	"Breakdown" (1980)	"Demolition Man" (1981)

Jamaican singer Grace Jones recorded a reggae-inflected version of the song on her 1980 album Warm Leatherette. Petty wrote a third verse of the song specifically for Jones to record; "It's OK if you must go / I'll understand if you don't / You say goodbye right now / I'll still survive somehow / Why should we let this drag on?" The song was edited from its full, 5:30 album version to a 3-minute-long track on single release. It was released as a US-only single in October 1980 but did not chart.

=== Reception ===
Billboard listed "Breakdown" as one of its recommended soul singles for the week of October 25, 1980.

=== Track listing ===
- 7" single – IS 49603

A. "Breakdown" (Edit) – 3:00
B. "Warm Leatherette" – 4:24

- 12" promo – PRO-A-920

A. "Breakdown" (Album version) – 5:30
B1. "Breakdown" (Edit) – 3:10
B2. "Warm Leatherette" – 4:24
