= Refugee (Tom Petty and the Heartbreakers song) =

Single by Tom Petty and the Heartbreakers

from the album Damn the Torpedoes
- B-side: "It's Rainin' Again"
- Released: January 11, 1980
- Recorded: 1979
- Genre: Heartland rock; garage rock
- Length: 3:25
- Label: Backstreet
- Songwriters: Tom Petty; Mike Campbell
- Producers: Jimmy Iovine; Tom Petty

Tom Petty and the Heartbreakers singles chronology
"Don't Do Me Like That" (1979)	"Refugee" (1980)	"Here Comes My Girl" (1980)

Music video
- "Refugee" on YouTube

"Refugee" is a song recorded by American rock band Tom Petty and the Heartbreakers. It was released in January 1980 as the second single from their 1979 album Damn the Torpedoes, and peaked at number 15 on the Billboard Hot 100 singles chart. The song is in compound AABA form.

== Composition and recording ==
The song's co-writer Mike Campbell said "Refugee" was one of the first songs he wrote, and recounted, "I just wrote the music and handed it to Tom [Petty] and he put the words over it, and when he did he found a way to make the chorus lift up without changing chords."

In a November 2003 interview with Songfacts, Campbell described the recording sessions for "Refugee":

That was a hard record to make. It was a 4-track that I made at my house. He (Tom Petty) wrote over the music as it was, no changes, but it took us forever to actually cut the track. We just had a hard time getting the feel right. We must have recorded that 100 times. I remember being so frustrated with it one day that—I think this is the only time I ever did this—I just left the studio and went out of town for two days. I just couldn't take the pressure anymore, but then I came back and when we regrouped we were actually able to get it down on tape.

== Reception ==
Billboard described "Refugee" as being "Petty at his best", specifically praising the "gutsy rock vocal and searing guitar lines". Cash Box said it has "growing interplay between guitar and organ, coupled with Petty’s forceful vocals". Record World called it a "perfect union of power and passion".

In 2017, Billboard ranked the song number 10 on their list of the 20 greatest Tom Petty songs, and in 2020, Rolling Stone ranked the song number two on their list of the 50 greatest Tom Petty songs.

== Personnel ==
- Tom Petty – lead vocal, rhythm guitar
- Mike Campbell – lead guitar
- Ron Blair – bass
- Stan Lynch – drums, backing vocal
- Benmont Tench – organ, backing vocal
- Jim Keltner – samba shaker

== Notable remakes ==
"Refugee" was covered by Melissa Etheridge in 2005 for her album Greatest Hits: The Road Less Traveled, and reached No. 96 in the Billboard Pop 100 chart. Other versions have been recorded by Vains of Jenna, Alvin and the Chipmunks, and the Gaslight Anthem.

== Chart performance ==
=== Weekly charts ===
Chart (1980)	Peak position
Australia Kent Music Report	24
Belgium (Ultratop 50 Flanders)	23
Canada Top Singles (RPM)	2
Netherlands (Dutch Top 40)	21
New Zealand (Recorded Music NZ)	3
U.S. Billboard Hot 100	15
U.S. Cash Box Top 100	11

=== Year-end charts ===
Chart (1980)	Rank
Canada	18
New Zealand	29
U.S. Billboard Hot 100	100
U.S. Cash Box	85

== Certification ==
Region	Certification	Certified units/sales
New Zealand (RMNZ)	Platinum	30,000^{‡}
^{‡} Sales+streaming figures based on certification alone.
