= The Waiting (song) =

Single by Tom Petty and the Heartbreakers

from the album Hard Promises
- B-side: "Nightwatchman"
- Released: April 20, 1981
- Recorded: Early 1981
- Genre: Folk rock; heartland rock; jangle pop
- Length: 4:01
- Label: Backstreet
- Songwriter: Tom Petty
- Producers: Tom Petty; Jimmy Iovine

Tom Petty and the Heartbreakers singles chronology
"Even the Losers" (1980)	"The Waiting" (1981)	"A Woman in Love (It's Not Me)" (1981)

Music video
- "The Waiting" on YouTube

"The Waiting" is the lead single from Tom Petty and the Heartbreakers' album Hard Promises, released in 1981. The song peaked at No. 19 on the Billboard Hot 100 singles chart and No. 1 on the magazine's new Rock Tracks chart, where it remained for six consecutive weeks during the summer of 1981.

The song was later reissued as the B-side to the single-only release of "Mary Jane's Last Dance" and "Something in the Air" in 1993, to coinside with the release of Greatest Hits

== Background ==
Frontman Tom Petty explained that the song's title was inspired by a quote from fellow musician Janis Joplin, who once said of touring, "I love being onstage and everything else is just waiting." He recalled:

That's where I think I got it from ... Roger [McGuinn] swears that he said it to me. Maybe he did. I don't think so. I think I got it from the Janis Joplin quote. That's where it stuck in my mind. I don't think she said, 'The waiting is the hardest part,' but it was something to that effect: 'Everything else is just waiting.' And so that's where that came from.

== Reception ==
Record World praised Petty's vocal performance and said that "Those guitars ring, soar & jingle-jangle with enough rock n' roll passion to warm the most jaded heart."

== Personnel ==
- Tom Petty – rhythm guitar, lead vocals
- Mike Campbell – lead guitar, bass guitar
- Benmont Tench – keyboards, backing vocals
- Stan Lynch – drums, backing vocals
- Phil Jones – percussion

== Charts ==
Chart (1981)	Peak position
Canadian RPM Top Singles	6
New Zealand Singles Chart	27
U.S. Billboard Top Tracks	1
U.S. Billboard Hot 100	19
U.S. Cashbox Top 100	14

== See also ==
- List of Billboard Mainstream Rock number-one songs of the 1980s
