= Damn the Torpedoes (album) =

1979 Tom Petty and the Heartbreakers album

Studio album by Tom Petty and the Heartbreakers
- Released: October 19, 1979
- Recorded: 1978–79
- Studios: Sound City (Van Nuys); Cherokee (Hollywood)
- Genres: Heartland rock; rock and roll
- Length: 36:38
- Label: Backstreet
- Producers: Jimmy Iovine; Tom Petty

Tom Petty and the Heartbreakers chronology
You're Gonna Get It! (1978)	Damn the Torpedoes (1979)	Hard Promises (1981)

Singles from Damn the Torpedoes
- 1. "Don't Do Me Like That" Released: November 5, 1979; 2. "Refugee" Released: January 11, 1980; 3. "Here Comes My Girl" Released: April 7, 1980; 4. "Even the Losers" Released: July 1980 (Australia only)

Damn the Torpedoes is the third studio album by the American rock band Tom Petty and the Heartbreakers, released on October 19, 1979. It was the first of three Tom Petty albums originally released by the Backstreet Records label, distributed by MCA Records. It built on the commercial success and critical acclaim of the band's two previous albums and reached No. 2 on the Billboard 200 chart. The album went on to become certified triple platinum by the Recording Industry Association of America (RIAA).

Widely regarded as one of Petty's best albums, Damn the Torpedoes was ranked number 313 on Rolling Stone's list of the "500 Greatest Albums of All Time" in 2003. It was moved up to number 231 in the 2020 revised list.

== Background and recording ==
Petty's recording contract was assigned to MCA when his distributor ABC Records was sold to MCA in 1979. Petty contended that his contract could not be assigned to another record company without his permission and was therefore voided. MCA responded by suing Petty for breach of contract which prompted him to declare bankruptcy as a tactic to void his contract with MCA. The matter was settled with Petty signing a new recording contract with Backstreet Records, an MCA subsidiary label. The album, co-produced by Jimmy Iovine, was recorded at Sound City Studios in Van Nuys and Cherokee Studios in Hollywood. The title is a reference to a famous quote by Admiral David Farragut: "Damn the torpedoes, full speed ahead!".

== Release and reception ==
Professional ratings
Review scores
Source	Rating
AllMusic	5/5 stars
Chicago Tribune	3/4 stars
Christgau's Record Guide	B+
The Encyclopedia of Popular Music	4/5 stars
The Essential Rock Discography	8/10
MusicHound Rock	5/5 stars
Music Story	5/5 stars
Pitchfork	9.2/10
Rolling Stone	5/5 stars
The Rolling Stone Album Guide	3.5/5 stars

The album was a breakthrough for Petty and the Heartbreakers. It was their first top 10 album, rising to No. 2 for seven weeks and kept from No. 1 by Pink Floyd's The Wall on the Billboard albums chart. Tom Petty's response to Westwood One about being anchored at No. 2 was "I love Pink Floyd but I hated them that year." It yielded two songs that made the top 15 on the Billboard Hot 100 singles chart, "Don't Do Me Like That" (No. 10) and "Refugee" (No. 15). Thanks to the new co-producer Jimmy Iovine, Damn the Torpedoes proved to be a major leap forward in production.

Critical reception generally reflected the commercial success of the album. The original review in Rolling Stone raved that it was the "album we've all been waiting for – that is, if we were all Tom Petty fans, which we would be if there were any justice in the world." Village Voice critic Robert Christgau said, "This is a breakthrough for Petty because for the first time the Heartbreakers ... are rocking as powerfully as he's writing. But whether Petty has any need to rock out beyond the sheer doing of it—whether he has anything to say—remains shrouded in banality. Thus he establishes himself as the perfect rock and roller for those who want good—very good, because Petty really knows his stuff—rock and roll that can be forgotten as soon as the record or the concert is over, rock and roll that won't disturb your sleep, your conscience, or your precious bodily rhythms."

Subsequent appraisals have remained positive, with AllMusic's Stephen Thomas Erlewine regarding it as "one of the great records of the album rock era". Rolling Stone placing it at number 313 on "The 500 Greatest Albums of All Time" list in 2003, the list's 2012 edition had it ranked 315th, and the 2020 edition ranked it at number 231. In 2000, it was voted number 537 in Colin Larkin's All Time Top 1000 Albums.

=== Re-releases ===
The album was digitally remastered by Joe Gastwirt and reissued in 2001 on HDCD.

On November 9, 2010, a deluxe edition of the album was released on three formats, a 2×CD set, a 2×LP (180 g) deluxe package and a Blu-ray Audio disc package. Digital download available in numerous audio codecs in audiophile quality 96 kHz/24bit through resellers such as HDTracks. All the tracks (original and unreleased) were remastered from the original analog master tapes by Chris Bellman at Bernie Grundman Mastering Studios in Hollywood.

== Track listing ==
All tracks are written by Tom Petty, except where noted.

Side one
No.	Title	Writer(s)	Length
1.	"Refugee"	Tom Petty; Mike Campbell	3:22
2.	"Here Comes My Girl"	Petty; Campbell	4:27
3.	"Even the Losers"		3:59
4.	"Shadow of a Doubt (A Complex Kid)"		4:25
5.	"Century City"		3:45

Side two
No.	Title	Length
1.	"Don't Do Me Like That"	2:44
2.	"You Tell Me"	4:35
3.	"What Are You Doin' in My Life?"	3:27
4.	"Louisiana Rain"	5:54
Total length:		36:38

=== Deluxe Edition ===
Disc one is the original album.

Disc two
No.	Title	Writer(s)	Length
1.	"Nowhere" (Outtake)		3:38
2.	"Surrender" (Outtake, 1979 version)		3:26
3.	"Casa Dega" (B-side from "Don't Do Me Like That" single)	Petty; Campbell	3:36
4.	"It's Rainin' Again" (B-side from "Refugee" single)		1:31
5.	"Shadow of a Doubt (A Complex Kid)" (Live at the Hammersmith Odeon, London, March 6, 1980)		4:42
6.	"Don't Do Me Like That" (Live at the Hammersmith Odeon, London, March 6, 1980)		2:49
7.	"Somethin' Else" (Live at the Hammersmith Odeon, London, March 6, 1980)	Sharon Sheeley; Bob Cochran	2:28
8.	"Casa Dega" (Demo)	Petty; Campbell	3:33
9.	"Refugee" (Alternate Take)	Petty; Campbell	4:32
Total length:			30:15

== Personnel ==
The Heartbreakers

- Tom Petty – lead vocals, rhythm guitar, harmonica, producer
- Mike Campbell – lead guitar, rhythm guitar, bass guitar on "Refugee" and "Here Comes My Girl", accordion on "Refugee"
- Benmont Tench – piano, organ, harmonium, backing vocals
- Ron Blair – bass guitar
- Stan Lynch – drums, backing vocals

Session musicians

- Donald "Duck" Dunn – bass guitar on "You Tell Me"
- Jim Keltner (uncredited) – samba shaker on "Refugee"

Recording

- Jimmy Iovine – producer
- Greg Calbi – mastering
- Shelly Yakus – engineer
- John Mathias – assistant engineer
- Thom Panunzio – assistant engineer
- Gray Russell – assistant engineer
- Skip Saylor – assistant engineer
- Tori Swenson – assistant engineer

Artwork

- Lynn Goldsmith – photography
- Dennis Callahan – photography
- Aaron Rapoport – photography
- Glen Christensen – cover photography
- Tommy Steele – art direction

== Charts ==
=== Weekly charts ===
Weekly chart performance for Damn the Torpedoes
Chart	Position
Australian Albums Chart	15
Canadian RPM Albums Chart	2
Dutch Mega Albums Chart	27
New Zealand Albums Chart	1
UK Albums Chart	57
US Billboard 200	2

=== Year-end charts ===
Annual chart performance for Damn the Torpedoes
Chart (1980)	Position
Australian Albums Chart	53
New Zealand Albums (RMNZ)	3
US Billboard Pop Albums	5

== Certifications ==
Certifications for Damn the Torpedoes
Region	Certification	Certified units/sales
Canada (Music Canada)	2× Platinum	200,000^{^}
United States (RIAA)	3× Platinum	3,000,000^{^}
^{^} Shipments figures based on certification alone.
