= Free Fallin' =

1989 single by Tom Petty

Single by Tom Petty

from the album Full Moon Fever
- B-side: "Down the Line"; "Love Is a Long Road"; "Free Fallin'" (live)
- Released: October 1989
- Genre: Heartland rock; folk rock; pop rock
- Length: 4:14
- Label: MCA
- Songwriters: Tom Petty; Jeff Lynne
- Producers: Jeff Lynne; Tom Petty; Mike Campbell

Tom Petty singles chronology
"Runnin' Down a Dream" (1989)	"Free Fallin'" (1989)	"A Face in the Crowd" (1990)

Music video
- "Free Fallin'" on YouTube

"Free Fallin'" is the opening track from American musician Tom Petty's debut solo album, Full Moon Fever (1989). The song was written by Petty and his writing partner for the album, Jeff Lynne, and features Lynne on backing vocals and bass guitar. The duo wrote and recorded the single in two days, making it the first song completed for Full Moon Fever.

"Free Fallin'" is Petty's highest- and longest-charting song. It peaked at No. 7 on the US Billboard Hot 100 singles chart in January 1990, becoming his third and final top-10 hit. It also charted in several other countries, peaking at No. 5 in Canada and No. 4 in New Zealand. Petty and the Heartbreakers performed the song at the MTV Video Music Awards in 1989, with Axl Rose and Izzy Stradlin, and at the February 2008 Super Bowl XLII Halftime Show.

The song is ranked No. 219 on Rolling Stone's "500 Greatest Songs of All Time" list. Lou Reed selected the song as one of his "picks of 1989". The song reached No. 2 on the Spotify Global Viral 50 following Petty's death in 2017.

== Development and meaning ==
Petty explained in an interview with Billboard magazine that he and Jeff Lynne were sitting around trying to come up with a song, and Lynne got him to say "free falling". The next day they recorded the song. Petty did not write the song about a specific person, but instead about what he saw during his frequent drives along Ventura Boulevard in Los Angeles. Lynne said "Probably the second song we wrote [for Full Moon Fever] was 'Free Fallin'.' I got the chords to it and we both fleshed out the chorus. It was like 'Evil Woman' in that we got a repetitive chord sequence and then the melody turns into a chorus. Everyone who heard it knew it was a hit, and the next song we did was 'I Won’t Back Down.'"

== Reception ==
"Free Fallin'" is widely regarded as one of Petty's best songs. Billboard and Rolling Stone both ranked the song number four on their lists of the greatest Tom Petty songs.

== Personnel ==
- Tom Petty – lead vocals and backing vocals, acoustic guitar
- Mike Campbell – 12-string electric guitar
- Jeff Lynne – acoustic guitar, bass, synthesizer and backing vocals
- Phil Jones – drums and tambourine

== Music video ==
The music video for the song was directed by Piers Garland and Julien Temple and features a teenage girl seen in various places around Los Angeles, including a 1960s pool party and a 1980s skate park. Petty is also seen performing in these places and others, such as the former Westside Pavilion mall.

== Track listings ==
US 7-inch and cassette
No.	Title	Writer(s)	Length
1.	"Free Fallin'"	Tom Petty; Jeff Lynne	4:14
2.	"Down the Line"	Petty; Lynne; Mike Campbell	2:54
Total length:			7:08

UK 7-inch
No.	Title	Writer(s)	Length
1.	"Free Fallin'"	Petty; Lynne	4:14
2.	"Love Is a Long Road"	Petty; Campbell	4:06
Total length:			8:20

UK 12-inch and CD
No.	Title	Writer(s)	Length
1.	"Free Fallin'"	Petty; Lynne	4:14
2.	"Love Is a Long Road"	Petty; Campbell	4:06
3.	"Free Fallin'" (live)	Petty; Lynne

== Charts ==
=== Weekly charts ===
Chart (1989–2012)	Peak position
Canada Top Singles (RPM)	5
Netherlands (Dutch Top 40 Tipparade)	11
Netherlands (Single Top 100)	61
New Zealand (Recorded Music NZ)	4
UK Singles (Official Charts)	59
US Billboard Hot 100	7
US Adult Contemporary (Billboard)	17
US Alternative Airplay (Billboard)	29
US Mainstream Rock (Billboard)	1
US Cash Box Top 100	6

Chart (2017)	Peak position
Australia (ARIA)	59
Sweden Heatseeker (Sverigetopplistan)	3
Switzerland (Schweizer Hitparade)	86
US Hot Rock & Alternative Songs (Billboard)	4

=== Year-end charts ===
Chart (1989)	Position
US Album Rock Tracks (Billboard)	1

Chart (1990)	Position
Canada Top Singles (RPM)	39
US Billboard Hot 100	64

Chart (2017)	Position
US Hot Rock & Alternative Songs (Billboard)	47

== Certifications ==
Region	Certification	Certified units/sales
Denmark (IFPI Danmark)	Gold	45,000^{‡}
New Zealand (RMNZ)	6× Platinum	180,000^{‡}
United Kingdom (BPI)	Platinum	600,000^{‡}
^{‡} Sales+streaming figures based on certification alone.

== Release history ==
Region	Date	Format(s)	Label(s)	Ref.
United States	October 1989	7-inch vinyl; cassette	MCA	
United Kingdom	November 6, 1989	7-inch vinyl; 12-inch vinyl; CD	MCA	

== Cover versions ==
- In 1993, De La Soul and Teenage Fanclub sampled the song for "Fallin'", which appeared on the Judgment Night soundtrack.
- In 1996, Stevie Nicks covered the song for the Party of Five soundtrack. This cover was also included In her Enchanted box set, released in 1998. Nicks has frequently included the song in both her shows with Fleetwood Mac, as well as solo, since Petty’s death in 2017. The performances are often accompanied by a video tribute to Petty.
- In 2007, John Mayer played an acoustic cover of the song in a performance at the Nokia Theater in Los Angeles, as a part of his 2008 live album Where the Light Is. The single was certified double platinum in Australia in 2021 and Gold in the UK by the British Phonographic Industry (BPI) in 2022.
- In 2013, American actress and singer Katey Sagal used the song as the opening track for her studio album of cover songs titled Covered.
- In 2017, Coldplay covered the song with Peter Buck of R.E.M. in Portland, Oregon, as a tribute to Petty following his death. Coldplay performed the song again in Pasadena, California, with James Corden.
- In 2025, John Mayer performed a cover of the song on January 30, 2025 at Kia Forum in Inglewood, California, for FireAid to help with relief efforts for the January 2025 Southern California wildfires.
