= Don't Come Around Here No More =

Single by Tom Petty and the Heartbreakers

from the album Southern Accents
- B-side: "Trailer"
- Released: February 28, 1985 (Europe); April 15, 1985 (US)
- Recorded: 1984
- Genre: Electronic rock; heartland rock; neo-psychedelia; synth-pop
- Length: 4:22 (single version); 5:07 (album version)
- Label: MCA
- Songwriters: Tom Petty; David Stewart
- Producers: Tom Petty; David Stewart; Jimmy Iovine

Tom Petty and the Heartbreakers singles chronology
"Change of Heart" (1983)	"Don't Come Around Here No More" (1985)	"Rebels" (1985)

Music video
- "Don't Come Around Here No More" on YouTube

"Don't Come Around Here No More" is a song written by Tom Petty of Tom Petty and the Heartbreakers and Dave Stewart of Eurythmics. It was released in February 1985 as the lead single from Tom Petty and the Heartbreakers' Southern Accents album.

== Background and writing ==
The original inspiration was a romantic encounter that producer David A. Stewart of Eurythmics had with Stevie Nicks of Fleetwood Mac. The collaboration was arranged by Petty after he suggested that Nicks and Stewart collaborate on a song. Stewart explained on The Howard Stern Show that the title's phrase was uttered by Nicks. She had broken up with Eagles singer and guitarist Joe Walsh the night before, and invited Stewart to her place for a party after an early Eurythmics show in Los Angeles. When the partygoers all disappeared to a bathroom for a couple of hours to snort cocaine, he decided to go upstairs to bed. He woke up at 5 a.m. to find Nicks in the room trying on Victorian clothing and described the entire scenario as very much reminiscent of Alice in Wonderland. Soon after the encounter, Stewart recorded a demo of "Don't Come Around Here No More" on a Portastudio. At this stage, the song consisted of a drum machine, synthesizer, electric sitar, and no lyrics other than the title.

Jimmy Iovine suggested that Nicks sing on "Don't Come Around Here No More". According to Nicks, the song was originally written for her album Rock a Little. Stewart mentioned in his memoir that Nicks originally attempted to pair the song with lyrics from her notebook, but Iovine found them to be too Shakespearean. Nicks then left the recording session, prompting Iovine to invite Petty into the recording studio to complete the song. After writing some additional lyrics for the song, including "stop walking down my street" and "I've given up...on waiting any longer", the two assembled another demo that was more developed than what Stewart had originally created. Petty then offered to complete the song with the rest of the Heartbreakers at his garage in Encino, Los Angeles after the initial sessions had concluded at Sunset Sound Recorders.

Both Petty and Stewart recalled that certain band members, including Mike Campbell, were initially unreceptive to the song. Stewart mentioned that Benmont Tench "knew that there was something to the song" and that "one by one, the band warmed up to me." Whereas Nicks was absent from the session, her backing vocalists still attended and recorded some parts at the insistence of Stewart. Nicks returned the next day to find that Petty and Stewart had recorded the song in her absence. Another backing vocalist, Stephanie Spruill, recorded the high note at the end of the song. Petty recounted the method that Stewart employed for Spruill to reach the note.

Dave actually ran into the room in his underpants as she was singing that bit. And that actually worked, and she went up into that register and did that note, and then burst out laughing.

— Tom Petty

Stewart said that the final recording combined aspects of his demo with a series of new tracks recorded by some session musicians and members of the Heartbreakers. He suggested that the Heartbreakers enter the song in double-time near the end of the track. Stewart also incorporated a snippet of a bass lick from a musician he was working with in England and brought a member from the London Philharmonic Orchestra into the recording studio to play cello. The remaining string parts were generated from a string synthesizer played by Tench. After hearing the complete song, Nicks declined to replace Petty's vocals, feeling she could not do the song justice. According to Iovine, Petty wanted to keep the song for himself. Petty recalled that he spent roughly one month working on the song with Stewart.

== Reception ==
"Don't Come Around Here No More" is widely regarded as one of Petty's best songs. In its contemporary review of the song, Cash Box said that it "features a surprisingly ethereal assortment of sounds including purely psychedelic guitars" and that "Petty’s gut-wrenching lead vocal ... is the captivating soul of the song." In 2017, Billboard ranked the song number six on their list of the 20 greatest Tom Petty songs, and in 2020, Rolling Stone ranked the song number three on their list of the 50 greatest Tom Petty songs.

== Music video ==
The music video is themed around the 1865 Lewis Carroll novel Alice in Wonderland, and it was directed by Jeff Stein. Stewart appears as the caterpillar at the beginning, sitting on a mushroom with a hookah water pipe while playing a sitar. Petty appears in the video dressed as The Mad Hatter, and actress/singer Louise Foley, later known as Wish Foley, played Alice. Alice eats a cake given to her by Stewart and tumbles into a black/white-patterned realm similar to the "Mad Tea Party" scene from Alice in Wonderland. She experiences a succession of bizarre events such as transforming into a pig sleeping in a baby carriage, being thrown into a large cup of tea by Petty who is also dropping sugar cubes and a donut into the cup, culminating in her body being turned into a cake and screams (lip-syncing Stephanie Spruill's high pitched vocal) and eaten by the guests at the tea party. The video ends with Petty swallowing Alice whole, burping softly, and wiping his mouth with a napkin as the song abruptly stops, cutting off the last 29 seconds of the closing guitar solo as heard on the album version.

== Personnel ==
The Heartbreakers

- Tom Petty – lead vocals, piano
- Mike Campbell – guitar, bass synthesizer
- Benmont Tench – string synthesizer
- Stan Lynch – drums, percussion
- Howie Epstein – bass guitar, vocals

Additional personnel

- David A. Stewart – electric sitar, synthesizer, vocals
- Dean Garcia – intro bass guitar
- Daniel Rothmuller – cello
- Marilyn Martin – backing vocals
- Stephanie Spruill – backing vocals
- Sharon Celani – backing vocals

== Chart performance ==
Chart (1985)	Peak position
Australia (Kent Music Report)	61
Canadian Top 100 Singles (RPM)	20
New Zealand (Recorded Music NZ)	42
US Cash Box	13
UK Singles (Official Charts)	50
US Billboard Hot 100	13
US Mainstream Rock Airplay (Billboard)	2
