= Missionary (album) =

Studio album by Snoop Dogg
- Released: December 13, 2024
- Recorded: July – November 2022; April – September 2024
- Genre: West Coast hip-hop
- Length: 46:23
- Label: Death Row; Aftermath; Interscope
- Producer: BoogzDaBeast; C.S. Armstrong; Danny Ezra Murdock; Dem Jointz; Dr. Dre; Eric Hudson; Erik "Blu2th" Griggs; FnZ; Focus...; Fredwreck; Jason "Sire" Turnbull; Jesse "Corporal" Wilson; J. LBS; Lawton "Agent" Bouhairie; Mell Beats; Preach Bal4; Sam Sneed; Self B Tru; The ICU

Snoop Dogg chronology
Snoop Cube 40 $hort (2022)	Missionary (2024)	Iz It a Crime? (2025)

Singles from Missionary
- 1. "Gorgeous" Released: November 1, 2024; 2. "Outta da Blue" Released: November 21, 2024; 3. "Another Part of Me" Released: November 29, 2024; 4. "Gunz n Smoke" Released: December 12, 2024

Missionary ratings
Aggregate scores
Source	Rating
AnyDecentMusic?	6.3/10
Metacritic	72/100
Review scores
Source	Rating
AllMusic	3/5 stars
RapReviews.com	7.5/10
Clash	7/10
The Independent (UK)	5/5 stars
NME	3/5 stars
Rolling Stone	3.5/5 stars
Slant	2/5 stars

Missionary is the twentieth studio album by American rapper Snoop Dogg. It was released on December 13, 2024, by Death Row Records, Aftermath Entertainment and Interscope Records. The production was done by Dr. Dre. The album features several guest contributions from Eminem, 50 Cent, Method Man, Jelly Roll, BJ the Chicago Kid, Jhené Aiko, Alus, and K.A.A.N. Tom Petty posthumously guest appears on the album as a vocal sample from "Mary Jane's Last Dance". Missionary follows his 2022 releases: BODR, his nineteenth studio album, and Snoop Cube 40 $hort, a collaborative effort as part of the West Coast hip-hop supergroup Mount Westmore.

== Background and promotion ==
Snoop Dogg first hinted at the Missionary album on social media in late 2022. He officially confirmed the project during an appearance on Stephen A. Smith's Know Mercy podcast, revealing that he and Dr. Dre had been working together for two months. He stated the album would be completed by November and described it as a celebration of the 30th anniversary of Doggystyle. "It’s produced by Dr. Dre, and the name of the album is Missionary," he said. When asked about the title, he simply responded, "The first album was Doggystyle."

In August 2023, rapper The D.O.C. described the project as striking a balance between the classic and modern Death Row sound: "It sounds like what Snoop's next record would've been like on Death Row."

In January 2024, Snoop provided an update, calling the album "masterful" and showcasing his artistic growth. “It’s the way [Dre] got me rapping—like a grown Snoop Dogg. He uses my voice like an instrument,” he said, praising Dre's production style and his ability to push him creatively.

In February, rapper and producer Erick Sermon revealed that he had contributed a “crazy” track to the album. However, the song was ultimately not included in the final tracklist.

Appearing on Jimmy Kimmel Live! on March 20, Snoop announced that Dre would begin mixing the album in mid-April. 50 Cent also confirmed his involvement as a featured artist.

During an Entertainment Tonight interview on August 13, Dr. Dre shared that mixing was nearly complete. He was working on track 11 out of a total of 14 or 16 and mentioned a September 1 deadline for final delivery to ensure a November release. He also revealed that he would appear vocally on one track and that Sting would be featured, along with what he called “an amazing roster of artists.” In a Complex interview, Snoop and Dre confirmed the album would "definitely" be released before Christmas. Method Man later announced his participation during a live episode of Drink Champs.

At the Bloomberg Screentime conference, Snoop continued teasing the guest lineup: “I got a feature from Jelly Roll and Sting. I'm so happy that me and Sting got a record that's so good.”

To promote the project, Snoop performed "Another Part of Me" during Fortnite Battle Royale’s Chapter 2 Remix with Remix: The Finale event. On the eve of the album's release, he debuted a new track, "Thank You", at The Game Awards 2024, where he also co-presented an award with his son, Cordell Broadus.

== Production ==
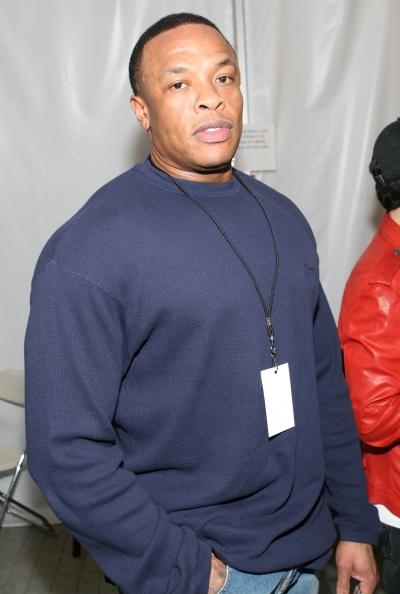
Snoop collaborated with fellow hitmaker Dr. Dre (pictured in 2008) on the album production.

The album was produced by Dr. Dre, who launched Snoop's career on the single "Deep Cover", in 1991 and produced the rapper's debut album, Doggystyle, in 1993. The album was a return to the sound of the rapper's first albums, released in the early-mid 1990s.

During an interview with Entertainment Tonight on August 13, 2024, Dre said "This one is going to show a different level of maturity with my music. I feel like this is some of the best music I've done in my career."

== Short film and music video releases ==
Missionary is also accompanied by a short film of the same name, directed by Dave Meyers and narrated by Method Man. The film stars Snoop and Dre, with cameos from several notable artists, including 50 Cent and Jhené Aiko. Unveiled on December 13, 2024, the short film was created to enhance the musical experience of the album by providing a unique visual narrative. On April 20, 2025, Snoop Dogg released the music video for "Last Dance With Mary Jane," once again directed by Dave Meyers. The video features appearances from Dr. Dre, who produced the track, Jelly Roll, who is featured on it, and several of Snoop's other famous friends. Some of these appearances are brought to life through AI-generated animations by Psyop and their studio partner, Temple Caché. Among the figures appearing are Tupac Shakur, Bob Marley, Redman, Method Man, B-Real, and Wiz Khalifa.

== Commercial performance ==
Early first week sales predictions for Missionary predicted the album would move 36,000 album-equivalent units, with 18,000 of that sum being pure album sales. In the United States, Missionary debuted at number twenty on the Billboard 200 chart, moving 38,000 album-equivalent units (including 20,500 in pure album sales)—the album moved slightly more units than what was predicted. This became Snoop Dogg's first album to chart in the top-twenty of the Billboard 200 since Bush (2015).

== Track listing ==
Missionary track listing
No.	Title	Writer(s)	Producer(s)	Length
1.	"Fore Play" (featuring BJ the Chicago Kid)	Andre Young; Brandon Perry; Tia Myrie; Varick Smith; Charlie Bereal; Erik Griggs; David Balfour; Farid Nassar; Dwayne Abernathy Jr.; Bernard Edwards Jr.	Dr. Dre; The ICU	1:15
2.	"Shangri-La"	Young; V. Smith; Perry; Abernathy Jr.; Cristina Gallo; Samuel Anderson; Jason Turnbull; Lawton Aekah Bouhairie; Ahmad Jamal	Dr. Dre; Sam Sneed; Jason "Sire" Turnbull; Lawton "Agent" Bouhairie	1:37
3.	"Outta da Blue" (featuring Dr. Dre and Alus)	Calvin Broadus; Young; Abernathy Jr.; Jahmal Gwin; Michael Mulé; Isaac De Boni; Perry; Myrie; V. Smith; Lisa Stansfield; Ian Devaney; Andy Morris; Mandy Priddice; Cedrick Letshou; Tina Bruins; Jack Daley; Oliver Price; Maya Arulpragasam; Mick Jones; Paul Simonon; Topper Headon; Joe Strummer; Wesley Pentz; Jesse Weaver Jr.; Clayton Ivey; Terry Woodford; Aubrey Graham; Dwayne Carter; Tyler Williams	Dr. Dre; Dem Jointz; BoogzDaBeast; FnZ	2:39
4.	"Hard Knocks"	Broadus; Young; V. Smith; Myrie; Perry; Kion Williams; Tiwan Raybon; Jesse Wilson; Khalif Muhammad; Edwards Jr.; Roger Waters; Bernado Baraj; Carlos Mellino; Ricardo Lew	Dr. Dre; Jesse "Corporal" Wilson; Self B Tru; Focus...	4:13
5.	"Gorgeous" (featuring Jhené Aiko)	Young; Terius Gesteelde-Diamant; Perry; V. Smith; Myrie; Griggs; Nassar; Balfour	Dr. Dre; Erik "Blu2th" Griggs; Preach Bal4; Fredwreck	2:56
6.	"Last Dance with Mary Jane" (featuring Tom Petty and Jelly Roll)	Young; Tom Petty; Jason DeFord; Perry; V. Smith; Myrie; Griggs; Nassar; Balfour; Abernathy Jr.; Edwards Jr.	Dr. Dre; The ICU	3:05
7.	"Thank You (Note: This track was not included on physical format.)"	Broadus; Young; Perry; Myrie; V. Smith; Williams; Griggs; Balfour; Nassar; Abernathy Jr.; Edwards Jr.; Marshall Mathers; Sylvester Stewart	Dr. Dre; The ICU	2:43
8.	"Pressure" (featuring Dr. Dre and K.A.A.N.)	Young; Perry; V. Smith; Jeremy Kollie; Abernathy Jr.; Sly Jordan; Melvin Henderson; Edwards Jr.; Luchi De Jesus	Dr. Dre; Focus...; Mell Beats	2:22
9.	"Another Part of Me" (featuring Sting)	Young; Perry; V. Smith; Myrie; Jordan; Yannick Koffi; Russell Vitale; Gordon Sumner; Griggs; Nassar; Balfour; Abernathy Jr.; Edwards Jr.	Dr. Dre; The ICU	3:27
10.	"Skyscrapers" (featuring Method Man and Smitty)	Young; V. Smith; Clifford Smith; Anderson; Turnbull; Bouhairie; Rafi Monclova; Aram Schefrin; Michael Zager	Dr. Dre; Sam Sneed; Turnbull; Bouhairie	3:00
11.	"Fire" (featuring Cocoa Sarai)	Young; Myrie; V. Smith; Perry; Raybon; Williams; Nassar; Edwards Jr.	Dr. Dre; Fredwreck; Focus...	3:42
12.	"Gunz n Smoke" (featuring 50 Cent and Eminem)	Young; Curtis Jackson; Mathers; V. Smith; Perry; Myrie; C.S. Armstrong; Christopher Wallace; Osten Harvey Jr.; Al Green; DeWayne Rogers Sr.; Allie Wrubel; Herb Magidson; Nashiem Myrick; Sean Combs	Dr. Dre; C.S. Armstrong	3:33
13.	"Sticcy Situation" (featuring K.A.A.N. and Cocoa Sarai)	Young; V. Smith; Perry; Myrie; Kollie; Abernathy Jr.; Edwards Jr.; Griggs; Nassar; Balfour; Isaac Hayes; David Porter; Suzanne Vega	Dr. Dre; The ICU	3:08
14.	"Now or Never" (featuring Dr. Dre and BJ the Chicago Kid)	Young; Bryan Sledge; Perry; Myrie; V. Smith; Eric Hudson; Daniel Murdock	Dr. Dre; Eric Hudson; Danny Ezra Murdock	3:18
15.	"Gangsta Pose" (featuring Dem Jointz, Stalone and Fat Money)	Young; Gallo; Myrie; Perry; Raybon; Jason Pounds; Henderson; Abernathy Jr.	Dr. Dre; J. LBS; Mell Beats; Dem Jointz	2:56
16.	"The Negotiator"	Young; V. Smith; Perry; Myrie; Anderson; Turnbull; Bouhairie; Carl Marshall; Robert Holmes; Abernathy Jr.	Dr. Dre; Sam Sneed; Turnbull; Bouhairie; Dem Jointz	2:22
Total length:				46:23

Sample credits

- "Fore Play" contains an interpolation of "People Make the World Go Round", as written by Thom Bell and Linda Creed, as performed by the Stylistics.
- "Shangri-La" contains a sample of "Swahililand", as written and performed by Ahmad Jamal.
- "Outta da Blue" contains samples of "Watermelon Fantasy", written by Mandy Priddice, Cedrick Letshou, Tina Bruins, Jack Daley and Oliver Price, as performed by Daylight Studio; "Saturday Night" as written and performed by Schoolly D; and "Scratchin", written by Clayton Ivey and Terry Woodford, as performed by Magic Disco Machine, and interpolations from "Paper Planes", written by Maya Arulpragasam, Mick Jones, Paul Simonon, Topper Headon, Joe Strummer and Wesley Pentz, as performed by M.I.A.; "All Around the World", written by Lisa Stansfield, Ian Devaney and Andy Morris, as performed by Stansfield; and an uncredited sample of "The Motto", written by Aubrey Graham, Dwayne Carter, and Tyler Williams, as performed by Drake featuring Lil Wayne.
- "Hard Knocks" contains a sample of "Mujer, Gracias por tu Llanto", written by Bernado Baraj, Carlos Mellino and Ricardo Lew, as performed by Alma y Vida, and an interpolation of "Another Brick in the Wall", written by Roger Waters, as performed by Pink Floyd, sung by MUSYCA Choir.
- "Last Dance with Mary Jane" contains a sample of "Mary Jane's Last Dance", written by Tom Petty and performed by Tom Petty and the Heartbreakers.
- "Thank You" contains a sample of "Thank You (Falettinme Be Mice Elf Again)", written by Sylvester Stewart, as performed by Sly and the Family Stone, and an interpolation of "The Watcher", written by Andre Young and Marshall Mathers, as performed by Dr. Dre.
- "Pressure" contains samples of "Spider and Fly", as written and performed by Luchi De Jesus; and The Champ, written by Harry Palmer, as performed by the Mohawks.
- "Another Part of Me" contains an interpolation of "Message in a Bottle", written by Gordon Sumner, as performed by the Police.
- "Skyscrapers" contains samples of "A Donde Quiera", written by Rafi Monclova, as performed by Marco Antonio Muñiz; and "Ain't Gonna Happen", written by Aram Schefrin and Michael Zager, as performed by Ten Wheel Drive.
- "Fire" contains a sample of "Come My Love", as written and performed by Ihsan Al-Munzer.
- "Gunz n Smoke" contains samples of "Dead Wrong", written by Christopher Wallace, Marshall Mathers, Carl Thompson, Osten Harvey Jr., Al Green; "Who Shot Ya?", written by Wallace, Allie Wrubel, Herb Magidson, Nashiem Myrick and Sean Combs; and "Notorious Thugs", written by Wallace, Bryon McCane, Anthony Henderson, Steven Howse, Combs and Steven Jordan, all as performed by the Notorious B.I.G.; and "Say You Love Me", as written and performed by D. J. Rogers.
- "Sticcy Situation" contains a sample of "Don't Get Caught", written by Isaac Hayes and David Porter, as performed by Mable John, and an interpolation of "Tom's Diner", as written and performed by Suzanne Vega.
- "The Negotiator" contains a sample of "Can't Stop Loving You", written by Carl Marshall and Robert Holmes, as performed by Soul Dog.

Notes

- Physical releases of the album omit "Thank You".
- Digital releases of the album credit Dr. Dre as a co-lead artist on all tracks.
- Missionary (with Instrumentals) was released digitally featuring instrumental tracks.

== Personnel ==
Credits adapted from liner notes.

=== Musicians ===
- Cocoa Sarai – vocals (track 1, 3–10, 12, 14–16)
- Chris Lowery – trumpet (track 1, 2, 4, 5, 7, 10, 14, 15)
- Chris Johnson – trombone (track 1, 2, 4, 5, 10, 14, 15), tuba (track 1, 2)
- Jerry "Jay Flat" Williams – saxophone (track 1, 2, 4, 5, 10, 14, 15)
- Stalone – vocals (track 2)
- Dem Jointz – vocals (track 2, 7, 9), drums (track 2, 4, 5), keyboards (track 8, 9, 11, 12), percussion (track 9)
- Erik "Blu2th" Griggs – keyboards (track 2, 4, 8, 12, 15), guitar (track 9, 11), bass (track 9, 11, 16)
- David "Preach" Balfour – keyboards (track 2, 4, 8, 10–12, 14–16), vocals (track 4)
- Fredwreck – keyboards (track 2, 4, 8–10, 15), percussion (track 3, 9)
- Focus... – drums (track 2, 12, 14, 16), keyboards (track 5, 9, 10, 15), percussion (track 9)
- K.A.A.N. – vocals (track 4, 5, 7, 9, 11, 15, 16)
- Sly Pyper – vocals (track 4)
- Mikhail Shtangrud – choir director (track 4)
- Kion Williams – drums (track 4, 7)
- The-Dream – vocals (track 5)
- MUSYCA Choir – vocals (track 4)
- Dr. Dre – vocals (track 1, 7–9)
- Russ – vocals (track 9)
- Sting – guitar (track 9), bass (track 9)
- Brandon Hodge – bass (track 11)
- Smitty – vocals (track 12)
- Thurz – vocals (track 12)
- Curt Chambers – guitar (track 13)

=== Technical ===
- Dr. Dre – mixing engineer
- Bernard "Bundini" Edwards – mixing engineer
- Quentin "Q" Gilkey – recording engineer
- Jeffery "Champ" Massey – assistant recording engineer, recording engineer (track 7)
- Brian "Big Bass" Gardner – mastering engineer
- Victor "Vic" Luevanos – assistant recording engineer (track 1, 4–6, 8–10, 12, 13, 15, 16)
- Fredwreck – recording engineer (track 4)
- Paris Nicole Arditti – recording engineer (track 4)
- Mo Cozey – recording engineer (track 4)
- Brandon Harding – recording engineer (track 5)
- Julio Ulloa – assistant recording engineer (track 7, 12–16)
- Martin Kierszenbaum – recording engineer (track 9)
- Tony Lake – recording engineer (track 9)
- Mike Strange – recording engineer (track 12)
- Tony Campana – recording engineer (track 12)
- Lola Romero – recording engineer (track 14)

== Charts ==
=== Weekly charts ===
Weekly chart performance for Missionary
Chart (2024–2025)	Peak position
Australian Albums (ARIA)	27
Australian Hip Hop/R&B Albums (ARIA)	3
Austrian Albums (Ö3 Austria)	18
Belgian Albums (Ultratop Flanders)	35
Belgian Albums (Ultratop Wallonia)	32
Canadian Albums (Billboard)	34
Dutch Albums (Album Top 100)	18
French Albums (SNEP)	26
German Albums (Offizielle Top 100)	7
Greek Albums (IFPI)	51
Italian Albums (FIMI)	67
Japanese Digital Albums (Oricon)	20
Japanese Hot Albums (Billboard Japan)	75
New Zealand Albums (RMNZ)	19
Polish Albums (ZPAV)	57
Scottish Albums (OCC)	55
Swiss Albums (Schweizer Hitparade)	4
UK Albums (OCC)	24
UK R&B Albums (OCC)	1
US Billboard 200	20
US Top R&B/Hip-Hop Albums (Billboard)	7
US Indie Store Album Sales (Billboard)	12

=== Year-end charts ===
Year-end chart performance for Missionary
Chart (2025)	Position
US Top R&B/Hip-Hop Albums (Billboard)	98

== See also ==
- Death Row Records
