= Alus (singer) =

American singer-songwriter (born 1994)

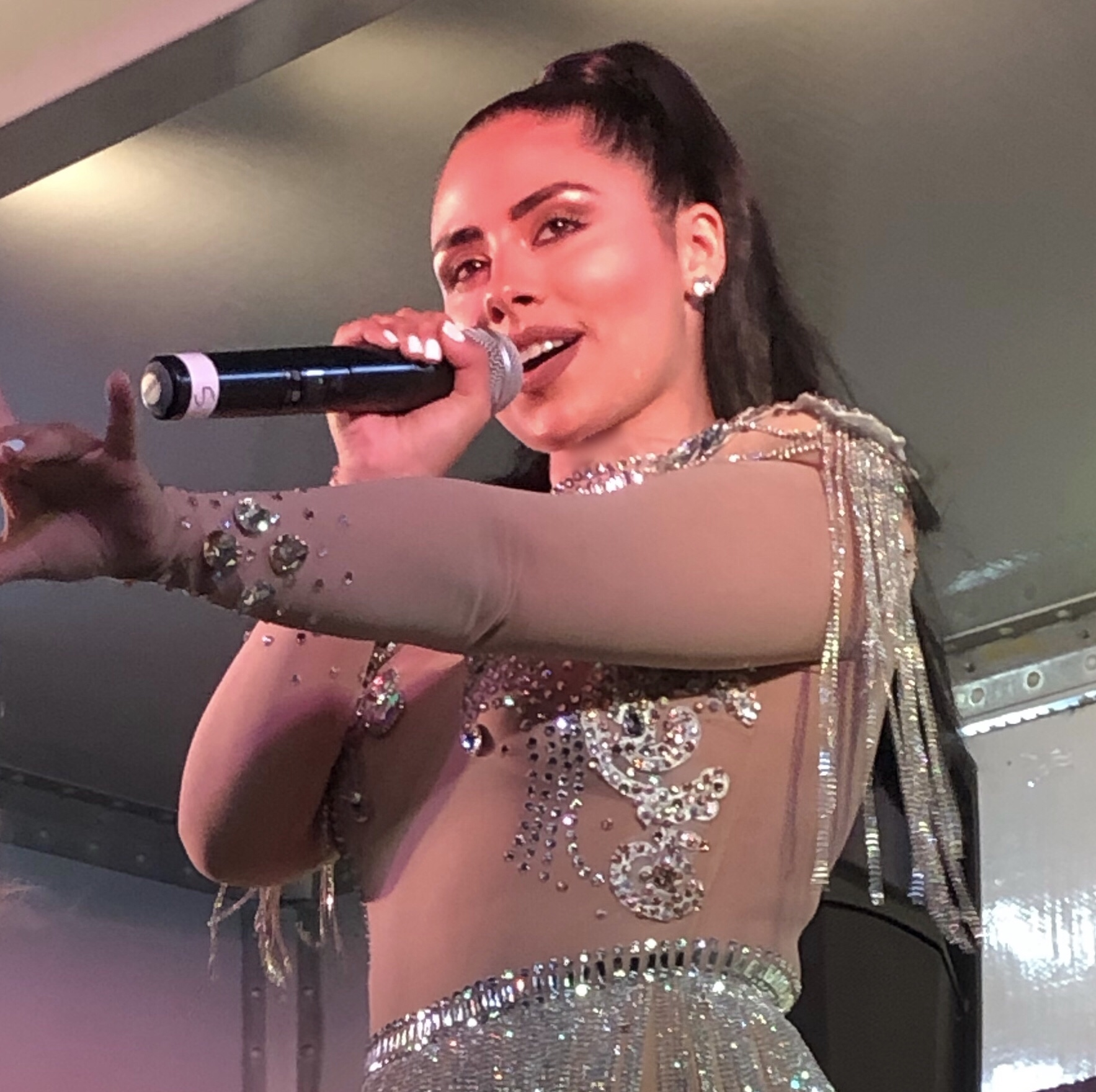
- Alus in 2019

Background information
- Born: Alus; January 1, 1994 (age 32); New Jersey, U.S.
- Occupations: Singer; songwriter; musician; producer
- Years active: 2014–present
- Label: Alustrious
- Website: www.alus.com

Alus, an American singer, songwriter, musician, and producer.

== Early life ==
Alus was born January 1, 1994, in New Jersey. Her grandmother's music had been a childhood influence, who was a renowned musician in the Violinaires, a group of violinists that performs with Frank Sinatra's The Rat Pack. Alus at a very young age, started performing on stage in musicals. When she was eleven years old, she started her classical vocal training in opera from a Curtis Institute of Music instructor and also received formal classical piano lessons. She is also a self-taught guitarist.

== Career ==
Alus's first release that gained traction was "Ordinary Girl". Released independently with much success on New York Radio, she gained the attention of music veterans Steve Rifkind and Russell Simmons. After teaming up with their Samsung sponsored label All Def Digital, Alus released the official music video that came out on the label's YouTube channel.

Alus records herself in her at home studio, releasing mash-ups and covers on her YouTube channel. She released them into monthly albums called the "Bedroom Covers" series. Her mashup video of XXXTentacion’s "SAD!" and The Weeknd’s "Call Out My Name" received over 1 million views. Alus was reposted by Nicki Minaj twice on her Instagram page after gaining attention from her remix of "Megatron" and mashup of "No Frauds", "Changed It", and "Regret in Your Tears".

Alus sang the national anthem at Madison Square Garden on many occasions including for the televised sold-out Canelo vs. Rocky boxing match in 2018.

In 2020, Alus released a new song every week in a series entitled "52 Shades of Alus" amassing over one million plays across streaming platforms.

In June 2021, Alus released “Wig!” featuring Cakes da Killa with sampled vocals from Canada's Drag Race Lemon in honor of Pride Month. Paper Magazine premiered the music video release calling it “a perfect ‘feeling yourself’ bop.”

In 2022, Alus independently released "Money Dance" with over 1.5 million views on YouTube.

Alus partnered with producer Rich Harrison to release "Lock In" in August 2023.

In 2024, she collaborated with Dr. Dre and Snoop Dogg on the track “Outta Da Blue”.

== Personal life ==
Alus is Puerto Rican on her mother’s side, and Russian and Austrian on her father’s. She is an advocate for animal rights, serving as an ambassador for the ASPCA.

== Discography ==
=== Albums ===
Title	Details
Lock In	Released: 2023; Label: Richcraft; Formats: Digital download
Money Dance	Released: 2022; Label: Alustrious; Formats: Digital download
