= Gunz n Smoke =

2024 song by Snoop Dogg feat. 50 Cent and Eminem

"Gunz N Smoke"

Song by Snoop Dogg featuring 50 Cent and Eminem

from the album Missionary
- Released: December 13, 2024
- Genre: Hip-hop
- Length: 3:33
- Label: Death Row; Aftermath; Interscope
- Songwriters: Andre Young; Curtis Jackson; Marshall Mathers; Varick Smith; Brandon Perry; Tia Myrie; C.S. Armstrong; Christopher Wallace; Osten Harvey Jr.; Al Green; DeWayne Rogers Sr.; Allie Wrubel; Herb Magidson; Nashiem Myrick; Sean Combs
- Producers: Dr. Dre; C.S. Armstrong

"Gunz N Smoke" is a song by American rapper Snoop Dogg featuring fellow American rappers 50 Cent and Eminem, released in 2024.

== Background and release ==
The track surfaced as part of ongoing collaborations between the artists and producer Dr. Dre. "Gunz N Smoke" was highlighted by music media outlets for uniting three major figures of 2000s hip hop on the same record.

== Composition ==
The song features all three rappers trading verses over production handled by Dr. Dre. Critics noted its throwback sound reminiscent of Dre's early 2000s style, as well as lyrical references to The Notorious B.I.G., which drew attention in hip-hop media.

== Reception ==
"Gunz N Smoke" drew notable coverage from hip-hop press outlets, with praise given to the lineup of veteran artists and the nostalgic production. Publications such as HipHopDX, Uproxx, and HotNewHipHop highlighted the track's impact and fan response.
