= Jourdan Dunn =

English model and actress (born 1990)

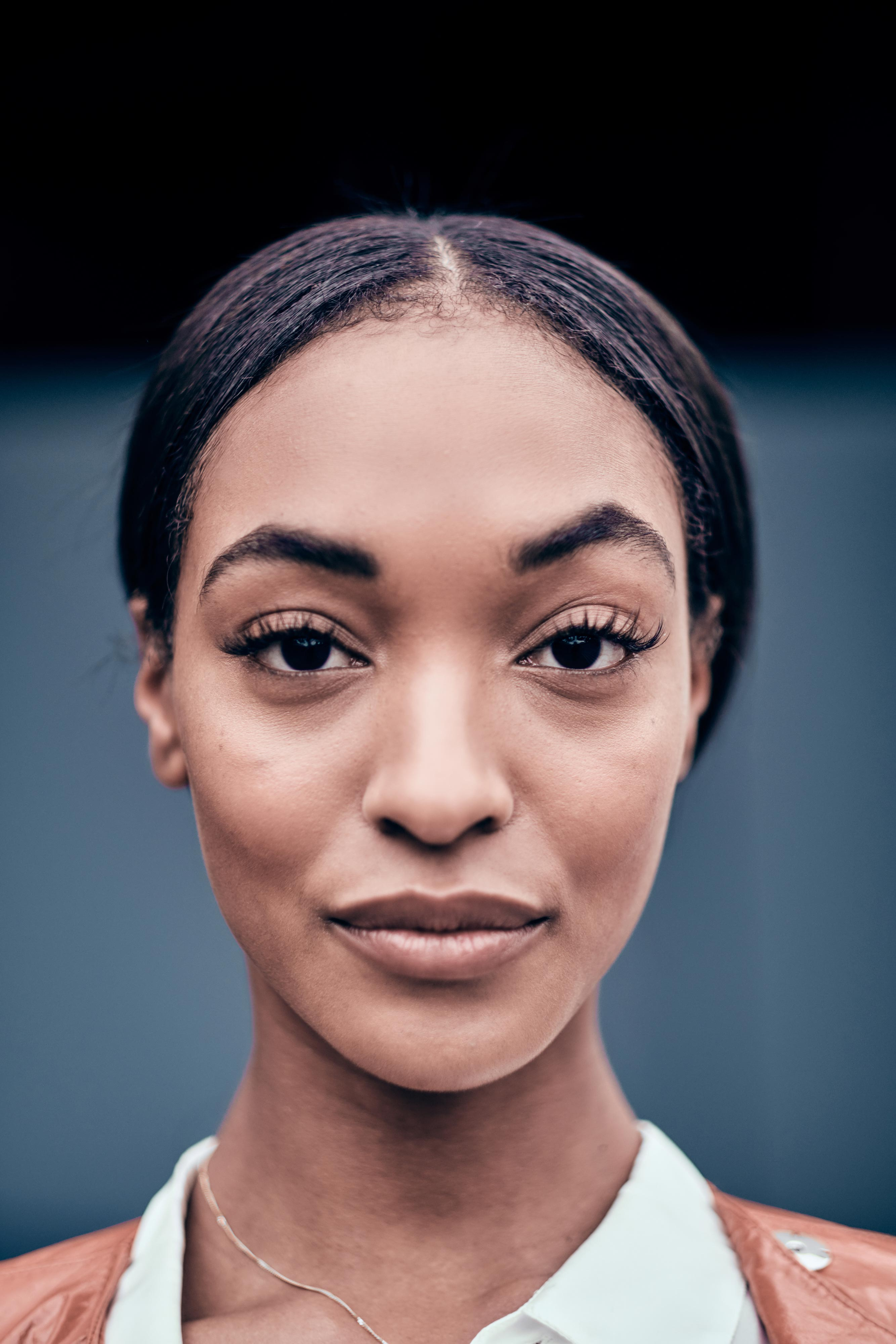
- Dunn in 2019
- Born: Jourdan Sherise Dunn; 3 August 1990 (age 36); London, England
- Occupation: Model
- Years active: 2006–present
- Children: 1
- Modeling information
- Height: 1.80 m (5 ft 11 in)
- Agency: Elite Model Management (New York, Copenhagen); The Squad (London); Women Management (Paris, Milan); Modelwerk (Hamburg)

Jourdan Sherise Dunn (born 3 August 1990) is a British model. She was discovered in Hammersmith Primark in 2006 and signed to The Squad Management in London. She began appearing on international runways in early 2007. In February 2008, she was the first black model to walk a Prada runway in over a decade.

In April 2014, it was announced that Dunn was signed as the new face of Maybelline New York. As of July 2014, she was declared an icon by models.com. Dunn is considered to be one of her generation's supermodels.

== Early life and discovery ==
Jourdan Dunn was born born 3 August 1990 in London, England. She attended Elthorne Park High School in Hanwell. Jourdan is of Jamaican, Syrian, and Grenadan descent. She admitted to being self-conscious as a teenager, due to her height and weight. She stated growing up, people would often tell her she should become a model, but she was apprehensive as she was not really sure what a model did. She commented that shows like America's Next Top Model intrigued her, as they gave her a new perspective of the job.

=== Personal life ===
She has one child. On 1 February 2020, Dunn became engaged to rapper Dion Hamilton.

== Career ==
At the age of 16, Dunn made her runway debut in the New York shows in the autumn of 2007, walking in shows for Marc Jacobs and Polo Ralph Lauren, among others. Soon after, she quickly rose to prominence within the industry. In 2007, she was featured on British Vogue as a "new star," and in 2008 Style.com listed her as one of the top 10 newcomers. She also walked 75 shows during the spring/summer 2008 season, including Louis Vuitton and Valentino. Dunn has since become a major fixture on runways, having walked for the industry's biggest designers. She was often distinguished for being the only black model in shows, for which she later condemned designers. She has garnered attention for her legs and for her walk which she says she practises frequently with very tall heels, walking over 60 shows during the spring 2009 season.

In July 2008, Steven Meisel selected Dunn to appear on the cover of the Vogue Italia issue devoted entirely to black models. She featured as a 'Face of the Moment' in May 2009's US Vogue. She has also been featured on the cover of American Vogue, British Vogue, Vogue Turkey, Vogue Japan, Vogue Brazil and Teen Vogue, Miss Vogue, Vogue Girl Korea, W Magazine, Glamour Magazine UK, Elle (France, UK, South Africa, Japan, Brazil), Wonderland, Manifesto, Fashion Magazine Canada, Madame Figaro, Pop, Russh, Muse, The Sunday Times Style, Ponystep, Antidote, Luella, and covering i-D magazine eight times.

She has been in campaigns for Ann Taylor, Burberry, Balmain, Calvin Klein, Yves Saint Laurent, DKNY, Michael Kors, John Galliano, Victoria's Secret, Tommy Hilfiger, Topshop, Kate Spade, Express, Jaeger, Rag & Bone, Gap, Aldo, Shiatzy Chen, Benetton, H&M, Banana Republic, Zalando, Free People, Selfridges, Neiman Marcus, Pepe Jeans, Liu Jo and Saks Fifth Avenue, and was the face of Rihanna's collections for River Island.

She has appeared in editorials for the American, Italian, French, British, Russian, Spanish, Turkish, Japanese, Brazilian editions of Vogue, Elle, i-D, Dazed & Confused, W, Pop, Centrefold and V, among others. In Teen Vogue's November 2009 issue where she appeared alongside Chanel Iman, she discussed her and Chanel's previous competitive relationship, as well as the challenges they faced being black models in the fashion world. The issue sparked controversy as Dunn; who was 18 at the time, announced her pregnancy. Teen Vogue faced backlash from the media, who accused them of glorifying teenage pregnancy.

She continued to model until she was six months pregnant and couldn't fit into any of the clothes, notably walking the catwalk for the Spring 2010 Jean Paul Gaultier show, with a baby bump. At the age of 19, ten weeks after giving birth, Dunn returned to the runway at London Fashion Week for the Winter 2010 season. For returning to work so quickly, she said her motivation was her son:

More than anything, having a son has made me realise I have to make shit work: I'm his voice, I'm his lifeline, I have to be driven. I think he pushed me in the right direction. I've always been ambitious, but now I have more focus. I'm more hardworking.

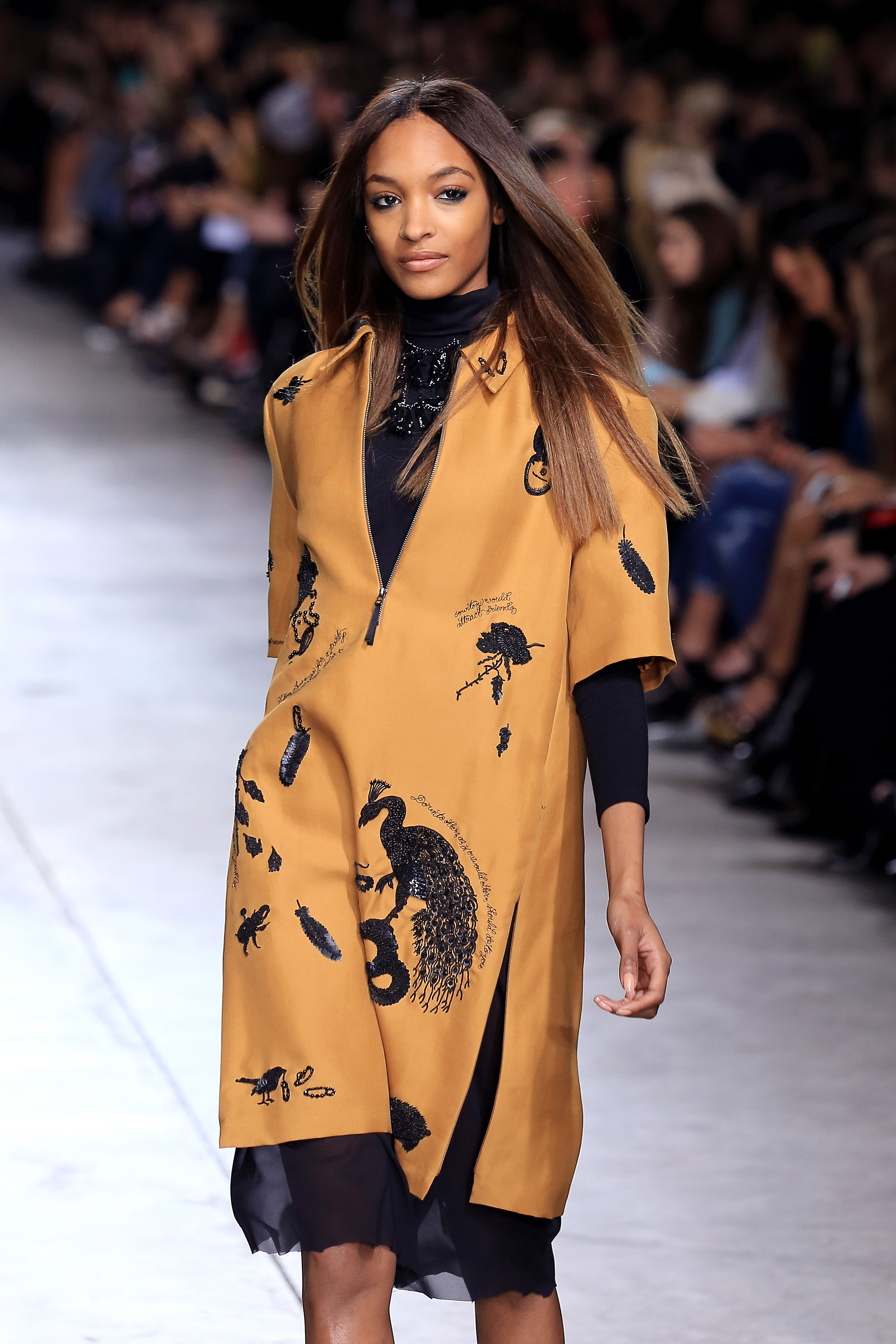
Dunn at 2014 London Fashion Week

During the 2012 Summer Olympics closing ceremony, Dunn was one of the British models wearing bespoke fashions created by British designers specifically for the event. The other models were Naomi Campbell, Kate Moss, David Gandy, Karen Elson, Lily Donaldson, Lily Cole, Georgia May Jagger and Stella Tennant. She wore a gold and white gown by Jonathan Saunders with feathered headdress by Stephen Jones. She also made her Victoria's Secret Fashion Show debut for the 2012 show.

In March 2013, Dunn appeared as the cover story in Net-a-Porter's The Edit. In it she spoke of encountering discrimination telling the magazine that casting agents would say clients "didn't want any more black girls". In July 2013, she received media attention for tweeting that she had been cancelled from a Dior haute couture show, "for her boobs"; rather than her skin colour – which she noted, "usually happens".

In April 2014, it was announced that Maybelline New York had signed her to join the brand. Her first role for the cosmetic company will be fronting the brand's Go Extreme Mascara, accompanied with print and television ads.

Forbes listed Dunn in their 2014 top-earning models list, estimated to have earned $US4 million in one year. She appeared on the 2015 list having earned $US3.5million.

She is pictured in the September 2015 issue of Vogue modelling a J. Mendel fox fur boa.

Dunn signed a deal with British multinational retailer Marks & Spencer to design a kidswear clothing collection. The collection; called "Lil' LonDunn by Jourdan Dunn", debuted in April 2016.

A collaboration between Jourdan and British fashion retailer Missguided was launched in April 2017, featuring athletic wear. Revenue for the company increased by 75%, with international sales increasing by 130%, whilst the campaign with Dunn was active.

She appeared in a music video for Nicki Minaj entitled "Regret In Your Tears", directed by Mert and Marcus in May 2017.

=== Accolades ===
In February 2008, Dunn became the first Black model to walk in a Prada fashion show during the 21st Century.

In November 2008, Dunn was named "Model of the Year" at the British Fashion Awards.

In November 2013, she won "Model of the Year" at the Harper's Bazaar Women of the Year Awards.

As of July 2014, she was declared an icon by models.com after appearing on their "Top 50 Models Women" list for seven consecutive years.

As of May 2015, Models.com declared her a "New Super", a selection of models who are recognised as modern day supermodels; having transcended the fashion industry and established themselves as brands and celebrities.

She won the "Inspiration Award" at the Glamour Women of the Year Awards 2015, for her philanthropic work raising awareness for Sickle-cell disease and her consistent activism for diversity within the modeling industry.

In November 2015, she won "Model of the Year" at the British Fashion Awards, for the second time.

In 2014, Forbes listed Dunn in their top-earning models list, estimated to have earned $US4 million in one year. She was the first Black British model to make the list. She appeared on the February cover of British Vogue in 2015, becoming the first solo Black model to grace the cover in 12 years.

=== Media and appearances ===
Dunn appeared in the music videos for "Yoncé" and "XO" from Beyoncé's fifth self-titled studio album which is widely described as a "visual album" due to every song being accompanied by a music video. The videos were shot in Brooklyn and Coney Island, New York, respectively. The "Yoncé" video was directed by Ricky Saiz and features fellow models Joan Smalls and Chanel Iman. The video was inspired by the 1990 David Fincher video for "Freedom" by George Michael, which also featured models, such as Naomi Campbell. The "XO" video was directed by Terry Richardson and features Dunn alongside Jessica White and Diandra Forres.

From 2012 to 2014, Dunn hosted a cooking show entitled Well Dunn, on Jay Z's Life+Times YouTube channel. The web show featured celebrity guest co-chefs, such as 2 Chainz, Wale, Karlie Kloss, Chanel Iman, Cara Delevingne and Joan Smalls.

She was a guest on The Jonathan Ross Show in March 2013 and later again in 2019, to discuss her career.

She appeared in the 2012, 2013 and 2014 Victoria's Secret Fashion Show.

== Awards and nominations ==
Year	Award	Category	Work	Outcome
2008	British Fashion Awards	Model of the Year	Herself	Won
2012	British Fashion Awards	Model of the Year	Herself	Nominated
2013	Harper's Bazaar Women of The Year	Model of the Year	Herself	Won
2014	British Fashion Awards	Model of the Year	Herself	Nominated
2015	Glamour Women of the Year	Inspiration Award	Herself	Won
2015	British Fashion Awards	Model of the Year	Herself	Won
2016	Elle Style Awards	Style Influencer of the Year	Herself	Won
2017	Glamour Women of the Year	Entrepreneur of the Year	Herself	Won

== Filmography ==
=== Films ===
Year	Title	Role
2016	Zoolander 2	Natalka
2016	Ab Fab: The Movie	Herself
2018	Terminal	Conejo

=== Television ===
Year	Title	Role
2012	Victoria's Secret Fashion Show	Herself
2013	The Jonathan Ross Show	Herself
2013	Britain & Ireland's Next Top Model	Herself
2013	The Face UK	Herself
2013	Victoria's Secret Fashion Show	Herself
2014	Victoria's Secret Fashion Show	Herself
2016	Chopped Junior	Herself
2017	The Untitled Action Bronson Show	Herself
2017	Movie Night with Karlie Kloss	Herself
2018	America’s Next Top Model	Special Guest
2021	RuPaul's Drag Race UK	Guest Judge; Series 2, Episode 3: "Who Wore It Best?"
2021	Celebrity Gogglebox	Herself
2022	Riches (TV series)	Davina Chase

=== Music video appearances ===
Year	Title	Original artist(s)	Director(s)
2013	"It's My Party"	Jessie J	Emil Nava
2013	"XO"	Beyoncé	Terry Richardson
2013	"Yoncé"	Beyoncé	Ricky Saiz
2015	"Every Day Is a Holiday"	Katy Perry	Jonas Åkerlund
2016	"Wolves"	Kanye West	Steven Klein
2017	"Regret In Your Tears"	Nicki Minaj	Mert and Marcus
2017	"Remix Fashion"	ASAP Rocky	
2018	"Nice For What"	Drake	Karena Evans
2021	"Woman"	Little Simz	Little Simz
