= Sidney Swift =

American record producer

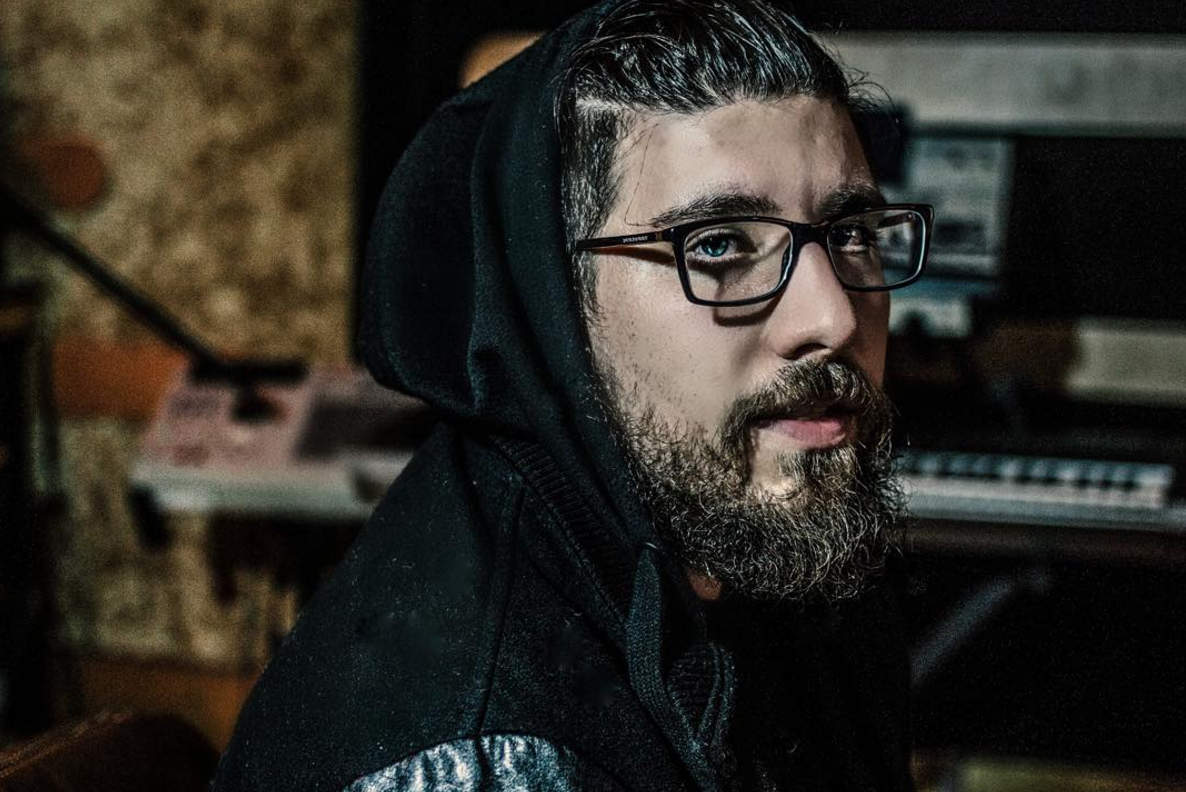

Background information
- Born: October 4, 1988
- Origin: Miami, Florida
- Occupations: Entrepreneur; Inventor; Record producer; songwriter

Sidney Swift is an American entrepreneur, inventor and multi-platinum record producer. He is the founder and CEO of AI platform recoupable.com.

Swift began his career in 2010 as a songwriter and producer, working with major artists including Nicki Minaj, Beyoncé, Lil Wayne, Panic! at the Disco, Big Sean, and Future. His credits include Beyoncé's "7/11", Jason Derulo's "Don't Wanna Go Home", and DJ Khaled's "Welcome to My Hood".

In 2018, Swift partnered with Atlantic Records to launch the virtual artist Chillpill. The project has released music with artists such as Rico Nasty, Sueco, and was nominated for a Grammy award. In 2020 he co-founded music tech venture studio Defi Entertainment, focusing on interactive music video games, on-chain communities, and was granted a US patent for inventing secondary device streaming technology. In 2022 Swift served on the Culture Council for Rolling Stone.

== Selected discography ==
Year	Artist	Album	Track	Songwriter	Producer	Mix Engineer / Vocal Producer
2011	DJ Khaled	We the Best Forever	"Welcome to My Hood"			check
2011	Jason Derulo	Future History	"Don't Wanna Go Home"			check
2011	Jason Derulo	Future History	"X"	check	check	check
2012	Jake Miller	Spotlight	"Runnin"	check	check	check
2013	Nelly	M.O.	"Heaven"	check	check	check
2014	Beyoncé	Beyoncé: Platinum Edition / More Only	"7/11"	check	check	check
2015	Major Lazer	Peace Is The Mission	"Light It Up"	check		check
2015	Noel	Noel: A Christmas Album	"The Motown Cafe"	check	check	check
2015	Noel	Noel: A Christmas Album	"Rudolph"	check	check	check
2015	Noel	Noel: A Christmas Album	"Jingle Bells"	check	check	check
2015	Noel	Noel: A Christmas Album	"Gifts"	check	check	check
2015	Noel	Noel: A Christmas Album	"Tags"	check	check	check
2015	Noel	Noel: A Christmas Album	"Joy"	check	check	check
2015	Noel	Noel: A Christmas Album	"Amazing Grace"	check	check	check
2015	Noel	Noel: A Christmas Album	"We Wish You A Merry Christmas"	check	check	check
2015	Noel	Noel: A Christmas Album	"Ceilings"	check	check	check
2015	Noel	Noel: A Christmas Album	"Little Drummer Boy"	check	check	check
2015	Noel	Noel: A Christmas Album	"Jingle Jingle"	check	check	check
2015	Noel	Noel: A Christmas Album	"Heal"	check	check	check
2015	Noel	Noel: A Christmas Album	"Silent Night"	check	check	check
2015	Noel	Noel: A Christmas Album	"Penny Pinchin"	check	check	check
2015	Noel	Noel: A Christmas Album	"$285 Million"	check	check	check
2015	Noel	Noel: A Christmas Album	"Noel"	check	check	check
2016	Big Sean	Non Album Single	"What A Year"	check		check
2016	TWENTY88	TWENTY88	"2 Minute Warning"	check	check	check
2016	Jhené Aiko	TRIP	"Maniac"			check
2016	Molly Moore	Shadow of the Sun EP	"Hallucinating"	check		check
2016	Keyon Christ	TBA	"Gods Of The City"	check	check	check
2016	Keyon Christ	TBA	"On My Way"	check	check	check
2016	Christina Chriss	Non Album Single	"From the Way"	check	check	check
2016	French Montana	MC4	"Check Come"	check	check	check
2016	French Montana	MC4	"Im Heated"	check	check	check
2017	Big Sean	I Decided	"Inspire Me"	check	check	check
2017	Baby E	Kill The Noise	"Satisfied"	check	check	check
2017	Wyclef Jean	J'OUVERT	Little Things Remix	check	check	check
2017	Wyclef Jean	Carnival III	Warrior	check	check	check
2017	Rita Ora	TBA	"Hallelujah"	check	check	check
2017	Stan Walker	New Take Over	"Messages"	check	check	check
2017	Stan Walker	New Take Over	"New Take Over"	check	check	check
2017	Marko Penn	Dirty Work	"Good Time"	check	check	check
2017	Marko Penn	Dirty Work	"Tithes & Offering"	check	check	check
2017	Marko Penn	Dirty Work	"Blame It On The Dope"	check	check	check
2017	Future	Hndrxx	"Use Me"	check	check	check
2017	Gucci Mane ft.Nicki Minaj	Mr. Davis	"Make Love"			check
2017	Nicki Minaj & Lil Wayne	Digital Single	"Changed It"	check	check	check
2017	Miguel	War & Leisure	"Pineapple Skies"	check	check	check
2018	Panic! at the Disco	Pray For The Wicked	"One Of The Drunks"	check	check	check
2018	Chloe & Halle	The Kids Are Alright	"If God Spoke"	check	check	check
2018	Riz La Vie	Digital Single	"Napkins"	check	check	check
2018	Keyon Christ	They Dont Want Us	"Unfuckingfortunately ft. Vic Mensa"	check	check	check
2018	Keyon Christ	They Dont Want Us	"Something Says"	check	check	check
2018	Keyon Christ	They Dont Want Us	"Nights Like This"	check	check	check
2019	Sabrina Carpenter	Singular Act: II	"Tell Em"	check	check	check
2019	Rose Villain	Digital Single	"Swoop"	check	check	check
2019	Santino La Saint	Digital Single	"Call You When I Get Home"	check	check	check
2019	Bryce Vine ft. YG	Carnival	"La La Land"	check	check	check

== Awards and nominations ==
Grammy Awards

Year	Nominee / work	Award	Result
2019	War & Leisure (as producer)	Best Urban Contemporary Album	Nominated
2019	The Kids Are Alright (as writer)	Best Urban Contemporary Album	Nominated
