= Last Dance with Mary Jane =

2024 song by Snoop Dogg and Dr. Dre featuring Tom Petty and Jelly Roll

Song by Snoop Dogg and Dr. Dre featuring Tom Petty and Jelly Roll

from the album Missionary
- Released: December 13, 2024
- Genre: Hip-hop
- Length: 3:05
- Label: Death Row; Aftermath; Interscope
- Songwriters: Andre Young; Tom Petty; Jason DeFord; Brandon Perry; Varick Smith; Tia Myrie; Erik Griggs; Farid Nassar; David Balfour; Dwayne Abernathy Jr.; Bernard Edwards Jr.
- Producers: Dr. Dre; The ICU

Music video
- "Last Dance with Mary Jane" on YouTube

"Last Dance with Mary Jane" is a song by American rapper Snoop Dogg, released on December 13, 2024, from his twentieth studio album Missionary (2024). It samples "Mary Jane's Last Dance" by Tom Petty and the Heartbreakers and features a vocal sample of Tom Petty from the song and American singer Jelly Roll. The song was produced by Dr. Dre and the ICU.

== Background ==
Tom Petty appeared in the 2017 docuseries The Defiant Ones, in which he said, "I tell you, the day Dre does a version of 'Mary Jane's Last Dance,' he's gonna have a big hit. That one's just waitin' to explode, but you need somebody like Dre to do it."

In an interview with Bootleg Kev, Snoop Dogg stated that he and Dr. Dre had come up with the concept, beat, hook and his verse. He had prepared a second verse, but Dre wanted to feature another artist instead. They began considering some country artists and eventually reached out to Jelly Roll. Dre wanted to send him the track, but Jelly Roll met them in person and recorded his verse in Snoop Dogg's absence.

On November 26, 2024, Snoop Dogg made a surprise appearance at Jelly Roll's concert in Nashville, Tennessee, and they performed the song.

== Composition and lyrics ==
"Last Dance with Mary Jane" centers around Snoop Dogg's love for smoking cannabis. The instrumental is composed of acoustic guitar. The chorus samples Tom Petty's vocals and the harmonica part from "Mary Jane's Last Dance", with him singing "Last dance with Mary Jane, one more time to kill the pain" and "I feel summer creeping in and I'm tired of this town again." In addition, the song opens with Petty's lyrics "keep movin' on" from the sampled song. Lyrically, Snoop Dogg reflects on his history with marijuana, which he personifies as his lover, rapping that he first smoked it when he was around five years old and "It was love at first light, fell in love the first night / My uncle told me, 'Don't rush, this could be your first crush'". He reminisces on smoking weed at age 17 to cope with his troubled life, which involved "serving fiends" and being imprisoned. Snoop also claims "I used to flip bags with her / Skip class with her". Jelly Roll performs the second verse, in which he sings about giving up on cannabis as it has only caused problems for him and also uses metaphors for the drug.

== Critical reception ==
Tom Breihan of Stereogum commented "The 'Mary Jane's Last Dance' flip is pretty obvious, but it works well enough, and Jelly Roll sounds good singing his verse. I wish Dre hadn't put filters all over Tom Petty's voice, though." AllMusic's Fred Thomas described the song as "merely corny before Jelly Roll comes in with an oversung, overly affected, and fully unnecessary vocal performance." Will Dukes of Rolling Stone wrote, "The rootsy 'Last Dance with Mary Jane,' featuring Jelly Roll and a wistfully rendered sample of the titular Tom Petty classic, is a gorgeous and cozy freefall down memory lane. There's a late-harvest glint to the guitar here, distinctly offset by a roadhouse stomp, punctuating Snoop's poignant reminiscences." Aron A. of HotNewHipHop stated "While 'Last Dance with Mary Jane' has potential as a 4:20 anthem, Jelly Roll's feature feels more suited to the Christian TikTok niche."

== Music video ==
An official music video premiered on April 20, 2025. It was directed by Dave Meyers and features animation from Temple Caché (Marion Castéra & Kelzang Ravach. After visiting the doctor (played by Dr. Dre), who shows him a comparison between a healthy lung and his own and warns that he must stop smoking weed, Snoop Dogg decides to smoke it for the last time. He navigates through hallucinogenic visuals showing his past and an imagined future, with both live-action and animated elements. He transports to a battle amid giant marijuana plants and "gets cozy with a mammoth marijuana bud", while an animated version of Jelly Roll appears in a prison yard which he breaks out of. The clip contains animated depictions of Tom Petty, who can be seen strumming and singing alongside Snoop Dogg, as well as that of 2Pac (whom Snoop meets in the afterlife), Bob Marley, Redman, Method Man, B-Real and Wiz Khalifa.

== Charts ==
Chart performance for "Last Dance with Mary Jane"
Chart (2024–2025)	Peak position
New Zealand Hot Singles (RMNZ)	9
Nicaragua Anglo Airplay (Monitor Latino)	6
