= Shether =

Single by Remy Ma
- Released: February 25, 2017
- Recorded: February 24, 2017
- Genre: Hardcore hip hop
- Length: 6:57
- Label: Empire
- Songwriters: Reminisce Mackie; Nasir Jones; Rondell Turner
- Producer: Ron Browz

Remy Ma singles chronology
"Heartbreak" (2017)	"Shether" (2017)	"Wake Me Up" (2017)

"Shether" (sometimes stylized as shETHER) is a diss track by American rapper Remy Ma. The song is aimed at rapper Nicki Minaj. It was released on February 25, 2017, by Empire Distribution. The song's title and beat is from the diss track "Ether" by Nas.

== Background and release ==
Disagreements between Remy Ma and Minaj sort of originated in 2007, when Ma took note of Minaj's freestyle record, nicknamed "Dirty Money", from her mixtape Playtime Is Over (2007), which uses the beat to "Yeah Yeah Yeah" by Terror Squad, a song that Ma rapped on. In the record, Minaj recites: "Tell that bitch with the crown to run it like Chris Brown/she won three rounds, I'ma need a hundred thou/like 'Chinatown' — bitches better bow down/oh you ain't know, betcha bitches know now/fuck I got a gun — let her know that I'm the one", which some believed to be referencing the crown worn in Ma's video for "Whuteva". Minaj reportedly never confirmed or denied that the song was about Ma, however Ma remarked in a 2010 interview, "To this day I still feel like [the song] is a stab at me; I'm gonna [diss Minaj] back for that one".

Although Ma and Minaj shared words of encouragement in recent years, their relationship soon soured behind the scenes by 2016, and they began releasing verses and songs with lyrics aimed at each other, including Ma's "Money Showers" with Fat Joe and Minaj's "Swalla" with Jason Derulo & "Make Love" with Gucci Mane, which was released two days before "Shether".

On February 25, 2017, "Shether" was released on both SoundCloud and online music stores. At the time of the track's release, Ma tweeted: "'You wanna see a dead body' (little kid from BoyzNdaHood voice) @nickiminaj" Upon release, the song was widely shared on social media.

The song was later banned from iTunes, SoundCloud and YouTube due to copyright violation, and has since been removed from all radio and online streaming services. According to TMZ, contrary to initial reports, Nas had nothing to do with the ban and that he did approve the use of his beat, and suggested that Universal, which has intellectual ownership of the song, took action to have it removed. Remy also continued her attacks on Minaj by releasing another track titled "Another One" on March 2.

== Writing ==
The lyrics of "Shether" contain a number of accusations and allegations regarding Minaj's personal and professional life and conduct towards others, including fellow music artists; Ma makes several accusations about Minaj's sexual affairs with members of Cash Money Records and other celebrities. The song also accuses Minaj of using plastic surgery on her rear to enhance her appearance, and criticizes Minaj for siding with her brother, who, at the time, was facing trial for the alleged rape of a minor. Remy also took aim at longtime rival & Minaj's friend Foxy Brown, talking about Brown's past hearing issues. Brown responded to Remy with the track "Breaks Over".

== Critical reception and response ==
The song was made as a response record to Minaj after Minaj's two diss records to Remy ("Swalla" and "Make Love"). A writer from BET named it an "unapologetically savage" track. Mitchell Peters from Billboard called it a "scathing diss track" that "doesn't show any mercy for Minaj."

After it was released, Minaj responded with a pair of Instagram posts. Ma claimed she "didn't expect a response" in an interview on The Wendy Williams Show. A week later, in an interview hosted by BuzzFeed News, Ma stated that she had second thoughts about releasing the diss track, and commented on the difficulties of being a woman in the music industry. When asked if she regrets releasing the track, she said:

I don't regret it, but I'm just not particularly proud of it either ... It just bothers me that, this record that I put out, where it's literally picking apart a female, went so viral ... We could have done the same thing, working together. I would have liked that so much better that way.

Minaj responded to Ma in her song "No Frauds" which was released on March 10, 2017.

== Live performances ==
Ma performed the song live at Summer Jam on June 11, 2017. During the performance, pictures of Minaj were shown on the stage screen.

== Track listing ==
Explicit digital download
No.	Title	Length
1.	"Shether"	6:57

Clean digital download
No.	Title	Length
1.	"Shether"	6:57

== Charts ==
Chart (2017)	Peak position
US Bubbling Under Hot 100 (Billboard)	19
US Bubbling Under R&B/Hip-Hop Singles (Billboard)	3

== Release history ==
Region	Date	Format	Version	Label	Ref.
United States	February 25, 2017	Digital download; streaming	Clean; Explicit	RNG; EMPIRE	
