= Light My Body Up =

2017 single by David Guetta

Single by David Guetta featuring Nicki Minaj and Lil Wayne
- Released: March 23, 2017
- Recorded: 2017
- Studio: Cruise Control Studios, Amsterdam, Netherlands
- Genre: EDM
- Length: 3:45
- Label: What a Music; Parlophone; Atlantic
- Songwriter(s): David Guetta; Julien Martinez; Ester Dean; Onika Maraj; Nick van de Wall; Dwayne Carter Jr.; Kirill Slepukha; Danil Shilovskii
- Producer(s): David Guetta; Julien Martinez

David Guetta singles chronology
| "Shed a Light" (2016) | "Light My Body Up" (2017) | "Another Life" (2017) |

Nicki Minaj singles chronology
| "Regret in Your Tears" (2017) | "Light My Body Up" (2017) | "Kissing Strangers" (2017) |

Lil Wayne singles chronology
| "No Frauds" (2017) | "Light My Body Up" (2017) | "I'm the One" (2017) |

Music video
- "Light My Body Up (Official Video)" on YouTube

"Light My Body Up" is a song by French music producer David Guetta featuring vocals from rappers Nicki Minaj and Lil Wayne, released on March 23, 2017.

== Background and release ==
After collaborating on "Where Them Girls At", "Turn Me On" and "Hey Mama", "Light My Body Up" marks the fourth time David Guetta and Nicki Minaj have worked together on a song. Released on March 23, 2017, the song carries a theme of fire throughout the piece and includes guest vocals by rapper Lil Wayne, his first time collaborating with Guetta since "I Can Only Imagine".

According to Minaj, earlier versions of the song only had her vocals and did not include her rap verse. The first verse was added later after Guetta played a demo of the song to his daughter Angie who remarked: "Why isn't Nicki rapping on it too?". The music was produced between May 12–15, 2016. Wayne's verse was also added later after Minaj surprised the French DJ with it.

== Composition ==
"Light My Body Up" is written in the key of F♯ minor with a tempo of 146 beats per minute.

== Music video ==
A lyric video was released on 23 March 2017 through David Guetta's YouTube channel.

The song's official music video was released on 5 May 2017. The video begins with a long shot of Miami Beach, Florida at night, then introduces the featured artists David Guetta, Nicki Minaj, Lil Wayne as well as director Benny Boom.

== Credits and personnel ==
- Songwriting: David Guetta, Julien Martinez, Ester Dean, Onika Maraj, Nick van de Wall, Dwayne Carter, Kirill Slepukha, Danil Shilovskii
- Production: David Guetta, Julien "Drek" Martinez
- Vocal production: Nick Cooper
  - Assistant: Nick Valentin, Brian Judd
- Recording: Aubry "Big Juice" Delaine, Manny Galvez; Cruise Control Studios, Amsterdam, Netherlands and Hit Factory Criteria, Miami, Florida
- Audio mixing: Daddy's Groove; Test Pressing Studio's, Naples, Italy
- Audio mastering: Daddy's Groove; Test Pressing Studio's, Naples, Italy

== Charts ==
=== Weekly charts ===
Weekly chart performance for "Light My Body Up"
| Chart (2017) | Peak position |
|---|---|
| Australia (ARIA) | 29 |
| Austria (Ö3 Austria Top 40) | 47 |
| Belgium (Ultratip Bubbling Under Flanders) | 6 |
| Belgium (Ultratip Bubbling Under Wallonia) | 11 |
| Canada (Canadian Hot 100) | 62 |
| CIS Airplay (TopHit) | 126 |
| Finland (Suomen virallinen lista) | 10 |
| France (SNEP) | 92 |
| Germany (GfK) | 33 |
| Hungary (Dance Top 40) | 25 |
| Ireland (IRMA) | 85 |
| Italy (FIMI) | 67 |
| Netherlands Dance (Dance Top 30) | 22 |
| Netherlands (Single Tip) | 11 |
| Netherlands (Dutch Tipparade 40) | 19 |
| New Zealand Heatseekers (RMNZ) | 3 |
| Scotland (OCC) | 28 |
| Sweden (Sverigetopplistan) | 55 |
| Switzerland (Schweizer Hitparade) | 39 |
| UK Singles (OCC) | 64 |
| US Bubbling Under Hot 100 (Billboard) | 6 |
| US Bubbling Under R&B/Hip-Hop Singles (Billboard) | 1 |
| US Hot Dance/Electronic Songs (Billboard) | 13 |
| US Anglo (Monitor Latino) | 16 |

=== Year-end charts ===
Year-end chart performance for "Light My Body Up"
| Chart (2017) | Position |
|---|---|
| Hungary (Dance Top 40) | 85 |
| US Hot Dance/Electronic Songs (Billboard) | 66 |
