= No Frauds =

Single by Nicki Minaj featuring Drake and Lil Wayne (2017)

Single by Nicki Minaj, Drake and Lil Wayne

from the album Queen (intended)
- Released: March 10, 2017
- Recorded: 2017
- Genre: Hip hop
- Length: 4:32
- Label: Young Money; Cash Money; Republic
- Songwriters: Onika Maraj; Dwayne Carter, Jr.; Aubrey Graham; Brittany Hazzard; Shane Lindstrom; Tim Gomringer; Kevin Gomringer
- Producers: Murda Beatz; Cubeatz

Nicki Minaj singles chronology
"Changed It" (2017)	"No Frauds" (2017)	"Regret in Your Tears" (2017)

Drake singles chronology
"Both" (2017)	"No Frauds" (2017)	"Passionfruit" (2017)

Lil Wayne singles chronology
"Changed It" (2017)	"No Frauds" (2017)	"Light My Body Up" (2017)

Music video
- "No Frauds" on YouTube

"No Frauds" is a diss track by rappers Nicki Minaj, Drake and Lil Wayne. It is a response to Remy Ma's 2017 song "Shether", a nearly seven-minute-long diss track aimed at Minaj. Produced by Murda Beatz and Cubeatz, it was released as a single on March 10, 2017, by Young Money, Cash Money, and Republic alongside "Changed It" and "Regret in Your Tears". In the song, Minaj criticizes Ma for her prison sentence and her record sales, among other things.

"No Frauds" debuted and peaked at number 14 on the Billboard Hot 100. Critics compared the song poorly to "Shether" and criticized Drake and Lil Wayne's appearances on the song. On April 19, the Benny Boom-directed music video for "No Frauds" was released, and showed the rappers in various locations throughout London. The video garnered backlash due to a scene featuring Minaj on the Westminster Bridge a month after the 2017 Westminster attack.

== Background and release ==
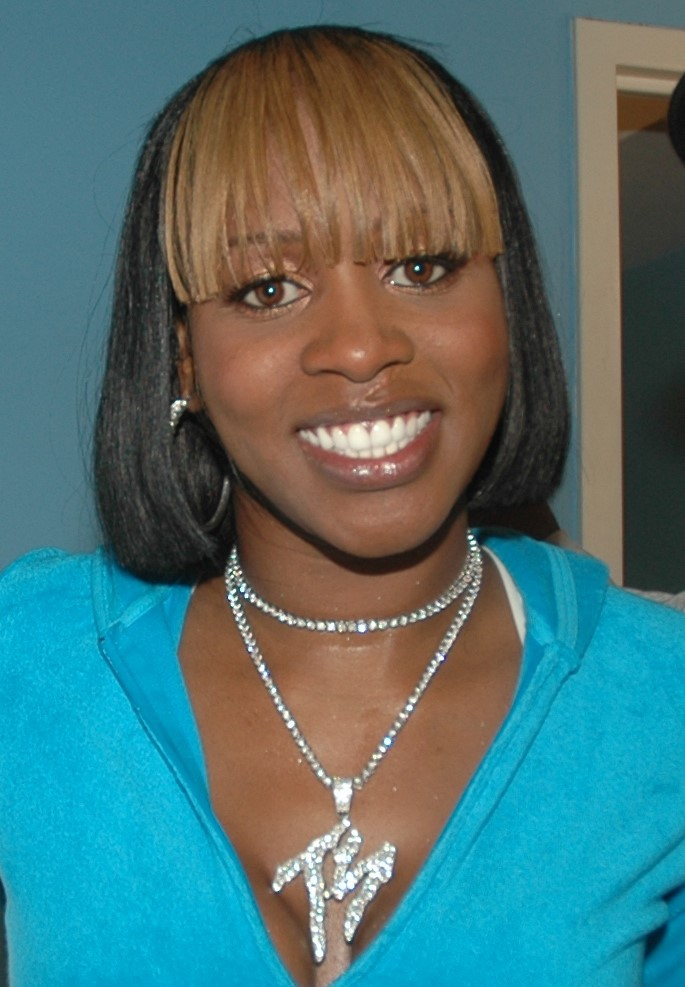
"No Frauds" was written as a response to the diss track "Shether" by fellow American rapper Remy Ma (pictured).

Throughout the mid-2000s, American rapper Remy Ma, a member of the hip hop group Terror Squad, frequently referred to herself in lyrics as the "queen of rap" and the "queen of NY". In 2007, Nicki Minaj released her debut mixtape, Playtime is Over, featuring the song "Dirty Money", on which she raps, "Tell that bitch with the crown to run it like Chris Brown," over the beat from Ma and Fat Joe's song "Yeah Yeah Yeah" from Terror Squad's final album, True Story. Ma, believing the verse to be directed towards her, confronted Minaj during a release party about the lyric. Ma was later sentenced to eight years in jail on charges of first-degree assault in May 2008 after shooting a friend of hers, who allegedly stole several hundred dollars from Ma. During Ma's time in jail, Minaj rose to fame. In August 2014, upon her release from prison, Ma spoke kindly about Minaj in interviews, stating that she was supported by Minaj during her time in jail and that she wanted to record a song with her. By late 2016, Ma had rapped several verses which fans perceived to be against Minaj, including in a cypher during the 2016 BET Hip Hop Awards, on her song "Money Showers" with Fat Joe, on a remix of the Phresher song "Wait a Minute", and in a freestyle on Funkmaster Flex's show on the radio station Hot 97.

In February 2017, Minaj was featured on the Jason Derulo song "Swalla", on which she rapped, "I gave these bitches two years, now your time's up/Bless her heart, she throwing shots, but every line sucks," perceived by fans to be a diss towards Ma, with "two years" presumably referencing the two years Ma had spent out of prison at the time of the song's release. Two days later, she released the song "Make Love" with American rapper Gucci Mane, where she rapped, "Oooohhh, oh you the qu-e-e-the queen of this here?/One platinum plaque, album flopped, bitch, where?", referencing the fact that Ma had recently received her first RIAA platinum certification for her song Fat Joe collaboration "All the Way Up", as well as the sales of Ma's album with Fat Joe, Plata O Plomo. Minaj went on to rap, "You see, silly rabbit, to be the queen of rap/You gotta sell records, you gotta get plaques", a reference to Ma's declaration that she was the "queen of rap".

One day after the release of "Make Love", Ma recorded and released the song "Shether", a nearly seven-minute-long diss track against Minaj which sampled the instrumental from Nas's song "Ether" in which she attacked Minaj for allegedly using a ghostwriter, her alleged plastic surgery, her fashion, her record deal, and the child sexual assault charges against Minaj's brother, and more. Minaj responded on Instagram by posting a screenshot of an article showing the opening week sales of Plata O Plomo as well as a video of American singer Beyoncé calling Minaj a "rap queen". Ma later released a second diss track directed at Minaj, "Another One".

On March 10, 2017, Nicki Minaj released three singles: "Regret in Your Tears", "Changed It" with Lil Wayne, and "No Frauds" with Drake and Lil Wayne, as part of her "#3PackFromParis" collection, recorded during her time at Paris Fashion Week. All three singles were intended to appear on her fourth studio album, Queen, but were ultimately kept as standalone singles. Following its release, Minaj posted to Instagram, writing that she was issuing a challenge to Ma, giving her "72 hours to drop a hit" and promising her half a million dollars if she was able to "book any show or interview" without mentioning Minaj, adding "Here @ Young Money, we don't do diss records, we drop HIT RECORDS & diss u ON them." She also responded to critics who criticized the delayed timing of her response to Ma, writing, "The greats took 3 months to respond to diss records. Queens don't move on peasant time."

== Composition and lyrics ==
"No Frauds"
On "No Frauds", Minaj attacks Remy Ma for her prison sentence for shooting her friend and her song "Another One", a diss track against Minaj which samples Drake's diss track "Back to Back".

"No Frauds" is a diss track aimed at Remy Ma. The song's title and chorus are a response to a lyric from Ma's second diss track against Minaj, "Another One", where she raps, "I swear to God, this chick a real fraud." In the song, Minaj criticizes Ma for her time in jail and her record sales, while also accusing Ma of getting plastic surgery and not being able to get clearance from Jay-Z to include the remix of "All the Way Up" on Plata O Plomo. She also makes mention of her own relationship with comedian Ellen DeGeneres, rapping, "I am the generous queen, ask Ms. Ellen." She goes on to criticize "Another One" while suggesting that Ma uses a ghostwriter, rapping, "Tried to drop 'Another One', you was itchin' to scrap / You exposed your ghostwriter, now you wish it was scrapped." The song has a "tense" and "sneaky" beat. Social media users compared the song's production to that of Drake's song "Summer Sixteen", also produced by Cubeatz.

== Promotion and reception ==
For Billboard, Sowmya Krishnamurthy wrote that "No Frauds" "completely misses the point of 'Shether'", adding, "The biggest impediment against 'No Frauds' – lyrics notwithstanding – was timing." Krishnamurthy also considered Drake and Wayne's appearance on the song "misaligned", writing that Minaj was "more than equipped at a solo response". Tom Breihan of Stereogum remarked that the only artist on "No Frauds" who "still sounds as good as ever" is Nicki, calling her verse "a great rap diss verse" and "vicious and righteous and petty and regal", but went on to write, "Remy still won, and I don't think Nicki will ever be able to do anything to change that." Writing for DJBooth, Brian "Z" Zisook called "Shether" "more cutting" and "more impressive" than "No Frauds", adding that Minaj "will be declared the winner by the public internet...as its ['No Frauds'] star power will basically guarantee more play than the quality of the song should merit". Zisook also criticized the appearance of Drake and Lil Wayne on the song, writing that "neither of them addressed the situation" and "the first lesson in Diss Records 101 says you don't bring backup to a rap battle".

"No Frauds" sold 78,861 copies during the first week of its release, debuting and peaking at number 14 on the US Billboard Hot 100 during the week dated April 1, 2017. The song fell 70 spots to number 84 in its second week. Minaj performed "No Frauds" at the 2017 Billboard Music Awards and the 2017 NBA Awards. She also performed the song at the Hot 107.9 Birthday Bash concert, where Ma was also performing.

== Music video ==
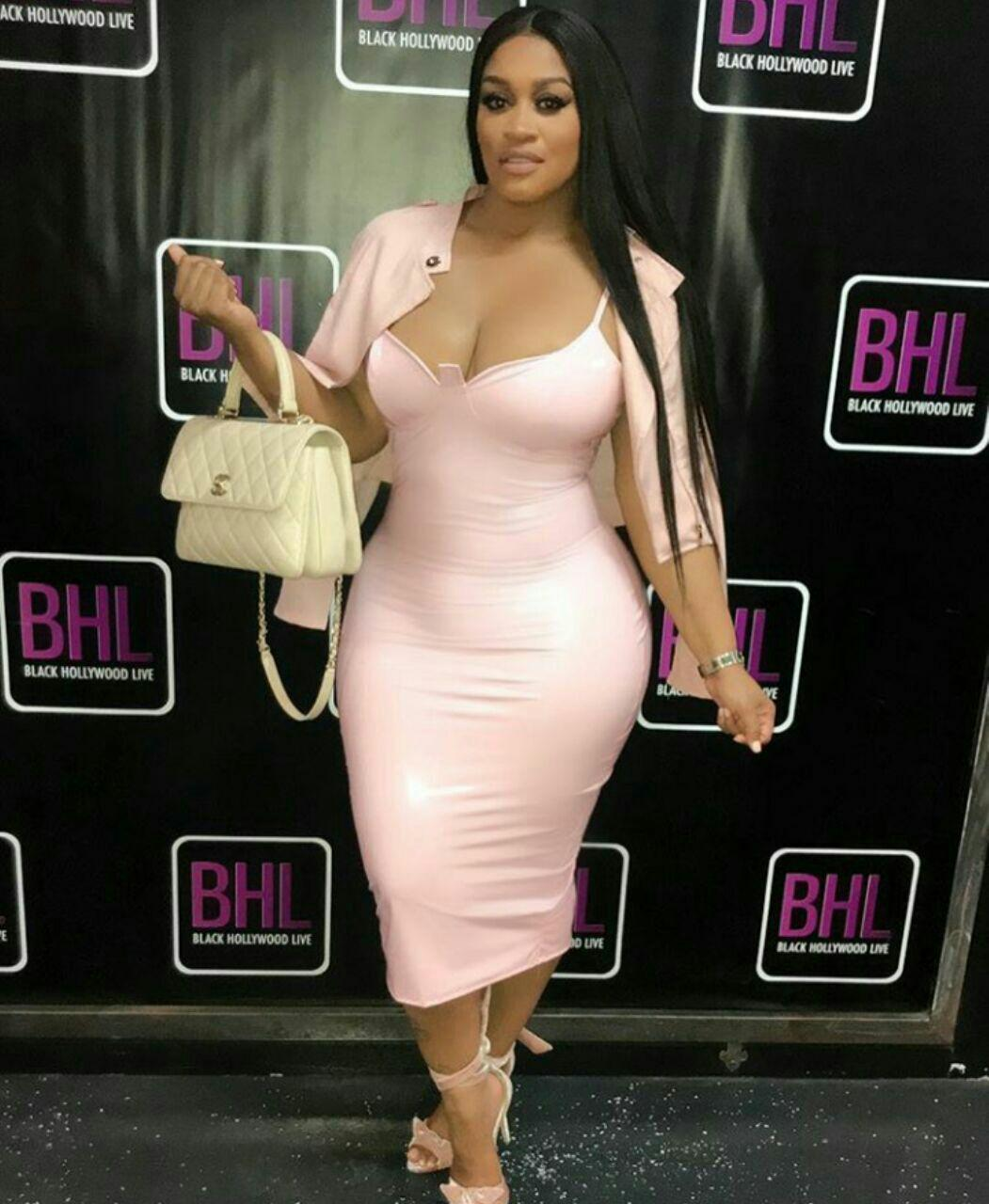
Rah Ali, an American television personality and Remy Ma's co-star on the reality television series Love & Hip Hop: New York, is mentioned by Minaj in "No Frauds" and makes an appearance in the song's music video.

The music video for "No Frauds" was released on April 19, 2017, a month after the song's release, and directed by Benny Boom. The video was filmed in various locations throughout London, including in front of Big Ben and in a club, and features Minaj, Drake, and Lil Wayne posing in those locations. In the video, Minaj wears clothing from Alexander McQueen and Agent Provocateur, Demode, and Osmose. Ma's Love & Hip Hop: New York co-star and former friend, Rah Ali, also makes a cameo in the video. The video was described as "flashy" and "luxurious" by Nolan Feeney of Entertainment Weekly.

=== Reception ===
Out's Justin Moran called the "No Frauds" video "surprisingly snoozy", writing, "Boom's treatment seems to rely heavily on Young Money's involvement, as Minaj ultimately gets outshined by the fire looks she wears throughout. Truthfully, her 'No Frauds' video should be credited as, 'Looks, featuring Nicki Minaj'." In 2019, Kelsey Klemme of E! listed "No Frauds" as one of Minaj's best music videos.

The music video received some backlash and criticism from fans and the media in the United Kingdom for featuring footage of Minaj on the Westminster Bridge, which had been the site of a terror attack weeks earlier. Previously, it was noted that clips of the bridge in the video would be cut. "When everybody involved in the project heard the news they were devastated and thought it would be in bad taste to feature it. The other London scenes will remain, but it's highly doubtful the bridge footage will make the cut", said an unnamed source from Minaj's camp via The Sun. Despite the statement, the scenes still ended up in the final cut of the video.

== Personnel ==
Adapted from TIDAL.

Production

- Cubeatz – producer, songwriting, programming
- Murda Beatz – producer, songwriting, programming, bass, drums
- Drake – songwriting, vocals
- Starrah – songwriting
- Lil Wayne – songwriting, vocals
- Nicki Minaj – songwriting, vocals

Technical

- 40 – engineering
- Jeff Edwards – engineering
- Aubry "Big Juice" Delaine – engineering
- Nicki Valentin – assistant engineer
- Yann Bordejo – assistant engineer
- Jaycen Joshua – mixing
- Dave Nakaji – assistant mixer
- Iván Jiménez – assistant mixer

== Charts ==
=== Weekly charts ===
Chart (2017)	Peak position
Australia (ARIA)	58
Australia Urban (ARIA)	3
Austria (Ö3 Austria Top 40)	73
Belgium (Ultratip Bubbling Under Wallonia)	39
Canada Hot 100 (Billboard)	25
ERROR in "CIS": Invalid position: 424. Expected number 1–200 or dash (–).
France (SNEP)	148
Germany (GfK)	95
Ireland (IRMA)	71
New Zealand Heatseekers (RMNZ)	3
Portugal (AFP)	92
Scottish Singles Sales (Official Charts)	42
Sweden (Sverigetopplistan)	94
Switzerland (Schweizer Hitparade)	50
UK Hip Hop/R&B (Official Charts)	2
UK Singles (Official Charts)	49
US Billboard Hot 100	14
US Hot R&B/Hip-Hop Songs (Billboard)	8
US Rhythmic Airplay (Billboard)	17

=== Year-end charts ===
Chart (2017)	Position
US Hot R&B/Hip-Hop Songs (Billboard)	92

== Certifications ==
Region	Certification	Certified units/sales
Australia (ARIA)	Platinum	70,000^{‡}
Brazil (Pro-Música Brasil)	Gold	30,000^{‡}
Canada (Music Canada)	Gold	40,000^{‡}
New Zealand (RMNZ)	Gold	15,000^{‡}
United Kingdom (BPI)	Silver	200,000^{‡}
^{‡} Sales+streaming figures based on certification alone.

== Release history ==
Region	Date	Format	Label	Ref.
Various	March 10, 2017	Digital download	Young Money; Cash Money; Republic	
United States	March 14, 2017	Rhythmic contemporary	Young Money; Cash Money; Republic	
