= Mary Jane's Last Dance =

1993 single by Tom Petty and the Heartbreakers

Single by Tom Petty and the Heartbreakers

from the album Greatest Hits
- B-side: "The Waiting"
- Released: November 1, 1993
- Genre: Rock; heartland rock; stoner rock
- Length: 4:35
- Label: MCA
- Songwriter: Tom Petty
- Producers: Rick Rubin; Tom Petty; Mike Campbell

Tom Petty and the Heartbreakers singles chronology
| "Something in the Air" (1993) | "Mary Jane's Last Dance" (1993) | "American Girl (reissue)" (1993) |

Music video
- "Mary Jane's Last Dance" on YouTube

"Mary Jane's Last Dance" is a song written by Tom Petty and recorded by American rock band Tom Petty and the Heartbreakers. It was recorded while Petty was recording his Wildflowers album and was produced by Rick Rubin, guitarist Mike Campbell, and Petty. The sessions would prove to be the last to include drummer Stan Lynch before his eventual departure in 1994. The song was first released as a single before being included as part of the Greatest Hits album in 1993. It rose to No. 14 on the US Billboard Hot 100, becoming Petty's first Billboard top-20 hit of the 1990s, and also topped the Billboard Album Rock Tracks chart for two weeks. Internationally, the song reached No. 2 in Portugal, No. 5 in Canada and No. 7 in Iceland.

== Content ==
Asked if the song was about drugs, Heartbreaker guitarist Mike Campbell said, "In the verse there is still the thing about an Indiana girl on an Indiana night, just when it gets to the chorus he had the presence of mind to give it a deeper meaning. My take on it is it can be whatever you want it to be. A lot of people think it's a drug reference, and if that's what you want to think, it very well could be, but it could also just be a goodbye love song." In the rest of the interview, Campbell said that the song was originally titled "Indiana Girl" and the first chorus began, "Hey, Indiana Girl, go out and find the world." He added that Petty "just couldn't get behind singing about 'hey, Indiana Girl,'" so he changed the chorus a week later.

== Critical reception ==
Alan Jones from Music Week gave the song three out of five, writing, "A Dylan-like delivery, a harmonica solo for good measure and some Beatles harmonies are all present and correct here. Another Top 40 hit for Petty."

== Music video ==
The music video for the song features Petty as a morgue assistant who takes home a beautiful dead woman (played by Kim Basinger). He then acts as if she were alive, putting her in front of a television set and then dressing her as a bride, sitting her at the dinner table and dancing with her. A scene in the video featuring the dead woman wearing a wedding dress in a room full of wax candles is loosely based on a passage from the Charles Dickens novel Great Expectations. The plot also has similarities with the 1970 Charles Bukowski short story "The Copulating Mermaid of Venice, California", which had already inspired the 1987 Belgian film Crazy Love and the 1991 French film Cold Moon.

Later, Petty is shown carrying her to a rocky shore (a scene filmed at Leo Carrillo State Park in California) and gently releasing her into the sea. At the end of the video, the woman floats to the surface and opens her eyes.

I said, "She's got to look really good, or why would he keep her around after she's dead?" I thought, "Kim Basinger would be good. I'd probably keep her for a day or two, let's go see if she would do it." You can make a joke about it, but you have to act a bit to be dead. It's not easy.

— Tom Petty on what made him decide that Kim Basinger would be a good choice for the corpse

Now that was one of the coolest things I've ever done in my life. It was classic, wasn't it? He was a doll, and he was so sweet and asked me to do it, and both of us are extremely shy so we just said three words to each other the whole time. I'll never forget how heavy that dress was! And I had to be dead the whole time. You know, it's really one of the hardest things I've ever done in my life, because I had to be completely weightless to be in his arms the way I was. It won all those awards, and the kids love it—even today!

— Kim Basinger

I did the "Mary Jane's Last Dance" video [in 1993] for one reason: Tom Petty. I didn't even care what it was about -- I was just blown away when he called. Then I heard the music, and I was so in love with the song. The director [Keir McFarlane] was a gruff guy; it was kind of like, his way or the highway. And I always found Tom to be incredibly sensitive and sort of a backseat guy. He was just very humble, beautifully shy. I'm not the most outgoing human being in the world, and I thought, "I'm shy; he's shy." But as the story really unfolded and this director kept saying, "Look, you have got to really play dead--all your weight," we laughed so hard. I just honestly couldn't keep it together sometimes! Tom had a great sense of humor. I remember getting out of the pool that day and just being so glad it was over, but so proud that I had worked with him.

— Kim Basinger

The video won the MTV Video Music Award for Best Male Video in 1994.

== Plagiarism allegations ==
In 2006, a US radio station claimed that Red Hot Chili Peppers hit single, "Dani California" had plagiarized "Mary Jane's Last Dance", even calling for Petty to sue the band. Longtime Petty and Chili Peppers producer Rick Rubin produced both songs. Petty responded by saying that he was not going to sue the Chili Peppers and felt that there was no negative intent and that a lot of rock and roll songs sound alike.

== Personnel ==
- Tom Petty – vocals, guitars, harmonica
- Mike Campbell – lead guitar
- Howie Epstein – bass guitar, backing vocals
- Stan Lynch – drums
- Benmont Tench – keyboards, backing vocals

== Charts ==
=== Weekly charts ===
| Chart (1993–1994) | Peak position |
|---|---|
| Canada Top Singles (RPM) | 5 |
| Europe (Eurochart Hot 100) | 59 |
| Germany (GfK) | 63 |
| Iceland (Íslenski Listinn Topp 40) | 7 |
| Netherlands (Dutch Top 40) | 35 |
| Netherlands (Single Top 100) | 26 |
| Portugal (AFP) | 2 |
| UK Singles (Official Charts) | 52 |
| US Billboard Hot 100 | 14 |
| US Mainstream Rock Airplay (Billboard) | 1 |
| US Pop Airplay (Billboard) | 5 |
| US Cash Box Top 100 | 14 |

| Chart (2017) | Peak position |
|---|---|
| US Hot Rock & Alternative Songs (Billboard) | 6 |

=== Year-end charts ===
| Chart (1994) | Position |
|---|---|
| Canada Top Singles (RPM) | 55 |
| US Billboard Hot 100 | 77 |
| US Album Rock Tracks (Billboard) | 14 |

| Chart (2017) | Position |
|---|---|
| US Hot Rock Songs (Billboard) | 78 |

== Certification ==
| Region | Certification | Certified units/sales |
|---|---|---|
| New Zealand (RMNZ) | 3× Platinum | 90,000^{‡} |
^{‡} Sales+streaming figures based on certification alone.

== Covers and other versions ==
=== Snoop Dogg and Dr. Dre Version ===
In 2024, Snoop Dogg and Dr. Dre released "Last Dance with Mary Jane", featuring Jelly Roll and vocals sampled from Petty's original recording. The song appeared on Snoop Dogg's album Missionary. Dre said the idea was inspired by an interview in which Petty predicted that a Dr. Dre version of "Mary Jane's Last Dance" would be a hit. Petty's family provided the original vocal and instrumental recordings, which Dre incorporated into a new arrangement; Jelly Roll recorded the second verse. An accompanying music video directed by Dave Meyers was released on April 20, 2025.
