= Changed It =

Single by Nicki Minaj and Lil Wayne

from the album Queen (intended)
- Released: March 10, 2017
- Recorded: 2017
- Genre: Hip hop
- Length: 4:55
- Label: Young Money; Cash Money; Republic
- Songwriters: Onika Maraj; Dwayne Carter, Jr.; Noel Fisher; Sidney Swift; Alex Goodwin
- Producers: Detail; Sidney Swift; Motiv

Nicki Minaj singles chronology
"Make Love" (2017)	"Changed It" (2017)	"No Frauds" (2017)

Lil Wayne singles chronology
"Running back" (2017)	"Changed It" (2017)	"No Frauds" (2017)

Audio video
- "Nicki Minaj, Lil Wayne - Changed It (Audio)" on YouTube

"Changed It" is a song by Trinidadian-born rapper Nicki Minaj and American rapper Lil Wayne. Produced by Motiv, Detail, and Sidney Swift, the song was released as a single on March 10, 2017 by Young Money Entertainment, Cash Money Records and Republic Records, along with "No Frauds" and "Regret in Your Tears".

== Background and release ==
On March 10, 2017, Nicki Minaj dropped three singles: "Regret in Your Tears", "Changed It" with Lil Wayne, and "No Frauds" with Drake and Lil Wayne, that were to be included on her upcoming fourth studio album. However, these singles were ultimately omitted from the final tracklist of Queen released the following year.

When all three singles debuted on the Billboard Hot 100, Minaj became the woman with the most entries on that chart at 76 songs, beating Aretha Franklin's record of 73 entries on the chart.

== Charts ==
Chart (2017)	Peak position
Australia Urban (ARIA)	24
Scotland Singles (OCC)	70
US Billboard Hot 100	71
US Hot R&B/Hip-Hop Songs (Billboard)	29

== Release history ==
Region	Date	Format	Label	Ref.
United States	March 10, 2017	Digital download	Young Money; Cash Money; Republic	
