= Regret in Your Tears =

Single by Nicki Minaj
- Released: March 10, 2017
- Genre: Hip hop
- Length: 3:48
- Label: Young Money; Cash Money; Republic
- Songwriters: Onika Maraj; Brittany Hazzard; Matthew Samuels; Adam Feeney; Allen Ritter
- Producers: Boi-1da; Frank Dukes; Ritter

Nicki Minaj singles chronology
"No Frauds" (2017)	"Regret in Your Tears" (2017)	"Light My Body Up" (2017)

Music video
- "Nicki Minaj - Regret In Your Tears" on YouTube

"Regret in Your Tears" is a song by rapper Nicki Minaj. Produced by Boi-1da, Frank Dukes and Allen Ritter, the song was released as a single on March 10, 2017, along with "Changed It" and "No Frauds". It details Minaj's break-up with ex-boyfriend Meek Mill and features her singing throughout the track.

== Background and release ==
"Regret in Your Tears" was released for digital download on March 10, 2017, alongside two other singles: "No Frauds" with Drake and Lil Wayne and "Changed It" with Lil Wayne; it was then released to contemporary hit radio on March 14, 2017. It details Minaj's break-up with ex-boyfriend Meek Mill and features her singing throughout the track. Minaj interpolates her 2010 song "Save Me" for the outro. Rumors surfaced about PartyNextDoor ghostwriting the song, which Minaj later dismissed.

== Music video ==
A lyric video for the single was uploaded to Vevo and YouTube on March 24, 2017. A music video was released on Tidal on April 30, 2017, and to other outlets on May 5, 2017. The video is directed by the duo Mert and Marcus. It opens with her sitting on the hood of a half drowned truck in a water body wearing a light flowy white outfit while donning a long wig that goes past her knees, as she starts reminiscing the good times in the relationship. The male counterpart can be seen crying and regretting the decision of ending the relationship. She is sporting a toned down look which corresponds to the dull and dark theme of the entire video.

== Charts ==
Chart (2017)	Peak position
Australia Urban (ARIA)	14
Canada Hot 100 (Billboard)	84
Scotland Singles (OCC)	45
UK Hip Hop/R&B (OCC)	14
UK Singles (OCC)	69
US Billboard Hot 100	61
US Hot R&B/Hip-Hop Songs (Billboard)	26

== Release history ==
Region	Date	Format	Label	Ref.
United States	March 10, 2017	Digital download	Young Money; Cash Money; Republic	
United States	March 14, 2017	Contemporary hit radio	Young Money; Cash Money; Republic	
