= Make Love (Gucci Mane song) =

Single by Gucci Mane and Nicki Minaj

from the album Mr. Davis
- Released: February 23, 2017
- Genre: Hip hop
- Length: 5:00
- Label: Atlantic; Young Money
- Songwriters: Radric Davis; Joshua Luellen; Onika Maraj
- Producer: Southside

Gucci Mane singles chronology
"Perfect Pint" (2017)	"Make Love" (2017)	"Down" (2017)

Nicki Minaj singles chronology
"Swalla" (2017)	"Make Love" (2017)	"Changed It" (2017)

Music video
- "Gucci Mane & Nicki Minaj - Make Love [Official Music Video]" on YouTube

"Make Love" is a hip hop song by rappers Gucci Mane and Nicki Minaj. It was released as a single on February 23, 2017, by Young Money Entertainment and Atlantic Records as the first single from Mane's eleventh studio album Mr. Davis.

It debuted and peaked at number 78 on the US Billboard Hot 100. On April 19, Mane released the music video for "Make Love". Following the release of the track, critics suggested that the track may have contained attacks directed at Minaj's enemies, most notably Remy Ma, who released the diss track, "Shether", aimed at Minaj, two days after "Make Love" was released.

== Background ==
The collaboration marks the first time after seven years Mane and Minaj were on a song together. The song also marks the first time the pair worked together since they exchanged heated words on Twitter in 2013.

On February 23, 2017, Mane announced on his Twitter that he was dropping the "hardest song of the year" at midnight. A music video soon followed.

On the track, Minaj takes shots at Remy Ma, who previously released "Money Showers" which was allegedly aimed at Minaj.

== Critical reception ==
The song received highly positive reviews from critics, most comparing Minaj's verse to her "Monster" verse. Vanessa Okoth-Obbo of Pitchfork praised the song, saying "Gucci's already claiming this is the 'hardest song of the year', and his swaggering verses find him extolling his fame, wealth, and finer things in life". Daniel Kreps of Rolling Stone wrote "Minaj appears on the second half of 'Make Love' to deliver a feisty verse that takes aim at an unnamed challenger to her throne: 'You see, silly rabbit / To be the queen of rap / You gotta sell records / You gotta get plaques / S, plural / Like the S on my chest / Now sit your dumb ass down / You got an 'F' on your test', she says on the track." The Musical Hype gave the track a three and half star rating, stating "'Make Love' truly has little to do with sex… Gucci flexes ('Damn, who colder than me?'). Nicki shuts it down ('I rep Queens where they listen to a bunch of Nas / I'm a yes and these b*tches is a bunch of nahs'). This isn't totally new from the ATL rapper or his partner-in-crime, but it works out sensationally all in all." The Fader's Will Bundy called the song "a bar-heavy banger with a twinkly melodic loop that feels a little like a throwback to 'Freaky Gurl'". Bundy also stated: "for the record, Nicki is going hard, and it kinda feels personal".

== Music video ==
The music video was directed by Eif Rivera. On March 27, 2017, Minaj surprised her fanbase with the "Make Love" visual release date on Twitter. The following day, the video was uploaded on Mane's Vevo. The video primarily shows Mane and Minaj, with Minaj seen delivering her verse seated on an oversized pool float unicorn. Meanwhile, Gucci is shown driving around his mansion, relaxed, listening to his music.

== Charts ==
Chart (2017–2018)	Peak position
US Billboard Hot 100	78
US Hot R&B/Hip-Hop Songs (Billboard)	33

== Certifications ==
Region	Certification	Certified units/sales
United States (RIAA)	Gold	500,000^{‡}
^{‡} Sales+streaming figures based on certification alone.
