= K.A.A.N. =

American rapper (born 1991)

- Born: January 12, 1991 (age 35); Howard County, Maryland, U.S.
- Origin: Howard County, Maryland, U.S.
- Genre: Hip hop
- Years active: 2014–present

Brandon Perry (born January 12, 1991), better known as K.A.A.N. (acronym for Knowledge Above All Nonsense), is an American rapper and singer from Maryland. He is best known for his fast-rhyming chopper style, breathless-style, vast vocabulary, and cynical lyrics based on mental health issues, abuse, politics, and religion.

== Life and career ==
Brandon Perry was born and raised in Maryland, and grew up in a trailer park. He got into music at an early age when his parents would play Tupac, among others such as Wiz Khalifa, Mac Miller, and Big Krit. He cites "When I was ten or so I bought every Tupac CD. I bought all his music. My parents played him, Nas and Biggie in the car and stuff. I listened to other guys, like Eminem, Jay-Z, Big Pun, O.C., Big L, a lot when I was younger too". K.A.A.N. (Knowledge.Above.All.Nonsense.) didn't feel any spesific push to make music, until catching a live performance by artist Logic in Baltimore. Perry started releasing music around 2014, but it wasn't until he released the video "KAANCEPTS" where his music started to gain attention. Perry used to work for a contracting and masonry company, working six days a week from Monday-Saturday to fund his rap career.

He currently resides in Los Angeles where he writes and records music at Dr. Dre's Record One Studio. He did a Mac Miller tribute song called “Rest Easy” in 2018.

In 2022 he released his twenty-fifth album titled “The High Before You Fall”.

== Artistry ==
Perry has stated Tupac Shakur is one of his greatest influences, stating how Shakur was "the only artist where I could literally feel the music", adding that he studied Shakur's music and would "[listen] to catch every word, mannerism, voice inflections." Perry has listed many other rap artists he took inspiration from, naming Nas, Eminem, Das EFX, EPMD, Big Pun, Biggie and Wu-Tang Clan. He has added that acts from other genres are also big influences in his style, Etta James, Smokey Robinson, Earth, Wind & Fire, Nirvana, and Adele.

When asked about his role and race in rap, Perry responded, "I'm obviously a younger black man, so that stuff is definitely in the back of my mind....All that stuff we're seeing nowadays with police brutality and racism and bigotry that we've always seen in this country, it's always in the back of your mind...I feel like if you're born black it's kind of like it comes with the territory. You've gotta know what's going on around you and what situations you're in. But in terms of me writing, I don't feel like I speak for anyone. I don't speak for young black men or black people. I speak for myself."

== Discography ==
=== Albums ===
- The Black Blood LP (2017)
- Voices (2017)
- Paradise / / Lost (2018)
- Pure Intentions (2018)
- 4/29/17 (2018)
- Subtle Meditation (2018)
- Gathering (2019)
- I.C.a.B.S. (2019)
- Requiem for a Dream Deferred (2019)
- Naiveté (2019)
- Twenty Nine (2020)
- Blissful Awareness (2020)
- Lost in Translation (2020)
- All Praise Is Due (2020)
- Vivid Canvas (2020)
- Long Time No See (2021)
- Kaizen (2021)
- Kaizen, Pt.2 (2021)
- Sunset Crest Dr. (2021)
- Mission Hillz (2022)
- The High Before You Fall (2022)
- Ignorance Is Bliss (2023)
- The Death of a Rapper (with Mike Summers) (2023)
- Peace of Minds (2024)
- Delusions of Grandeur (2024)
- In Due Time (2024)
- YESTERDAY (2025)

=== Mixtapes ===
- Losing My Religion (2014)
- Abstract Art (2015)
- Nameless (2019)

=== Extended plays ===
- 1/12/199? (2015)
- Eclectic Audio (2016)
- Uncommon Knowledge (2016)
- K.A.A.N X SGULL (2016)
- K.A.A.N. X Genshin (2016)
- K.A.A.N. X Eremsy EP (2017)
- Littlegreenhouse (2017)
- Abstractions (2017)
- K.A.A.N. X SGULL Vol.2 (2017)
- 2609 (2017)
- The Middle (2017)
- Heart Shaped Melody (2018)
- Mission to Mission Hillz (2019)

=== Singles ===
- "Still" (2016)
- "Water" (2016)
- "How High" (2017)
- "Circles" (2017)
- "Up" (2017)
- "All We Got" (2017)
- "Ride" (2017)
- "Eleven" (2017)
- "Inner Thoughts" (2017)
- "Holding On" (2018)
- "OASIS GONE" (2018)
- "No Illusions" (2018)
- "1492 Conquest of Paradise" (2018)
- "Mind Games" (2019)
- "2 Busy" (2019)
- "Double Dealing" (2019)
- "Goof Troop" (2019)
- "Slight Bent" (2020)
- "Meek Interview" (2020)
- "Simonal" (2020)
- "Pino" (2020)
- "Rosinha" (extended single edit) (2020)
- "SkyLight" (2020)
- "Lost Kings" (2020)
- "Trickle Down Economics" (2020)
- "BIG" (2021)
- "No Competition" (2021)
- "RULZ" (2021)
- "Resonate" (2021)
- "Amedeo Tommasi" (2021)
- "Matter Fact" (2021)
- "2 Much" (2022)
- "I See" (2022)
- "Greatness" (2022)
- "The Recipe" (2022)
- "Audio Murder" (2022)
- "Get Out the Way" (2022)
- "O.M.S" (2022)
- "Room at the Table" (2022)
- "2ya" (2022)
- "Time Fly's" (2022)
- "It Gets Easy" (2022)
- "Makin' Friends" (2023)
- "Motion" (2023)
- "Clarity" (2023)
- "Cost of Doing Business" (2023)
- "Dope" (2023)
- "Rhyme or Reason" (2023)
- "Evident" (2023)
- "The Assignment" (2023)
- "High Beams" (2023)
- "How It Goes" (2023)
- "The Fame" (2023)
- "The Death of a Rapper" (2023)
- "2 in tha Front" (2023)
- "Good Intentions Freestyle" (2023)
- "Buzzin'" (2023)
- "Bang Bus" (2023)
- "Dying Breed" (2024)
- "Basque" (2024)
- "The Plot Thickens" (2024)
