= The Best of Everything (album) =

Greatest hits album by Tom Petty
- Released: March 1, 2019
- Recorded: 1976–2016
- Studio: Various
- Genre: Heartland rock
- Length: 146:04
- Language: English
- Labels: Geffen; Universal Music Enterprises
- Producer: Various
- Compilers: Mike Campbell; Adria Petty; Dana Petty; Benmont Tench; Ryan Ulyate

Tom Petty chronology
An American Treasure (2018)	The Best of Everything (2019)	Wildflowers & All the Rest (2020)

Singles from The Best of Everything
- 1. "The Best of Everything" Released: October 5, 2018; 2. "For Real" Released: February 15, 2019

The Best of Everything is a 2019 greatest hits album with recordings made by Tom Petty, with his backing band The Heartbreakers, as a solo artist, and with Mudcrutch. It was released on March 1.

== Release and promotion ==
The compilation was originally due to be released in 2018, immediately following An American Treasure and the alternative take of the title track, released as the first single, for digital streaming. "For Real" was released as the second single.

"For Real" was recorded in August 2000 when Petty and the Heartbreakers went to Bill Bottrell's studio to record a new version of "Surrender". "Surrender" was placed on Anthology: Through the Years, while "For Real" remained unissued until 2019.

== Reception ==
Writing for AllMusic, Stephen Thomas Erlewine says the album is "the best overall overview of—and perhaps introduction to—Tom Petty assembled to date".

== "The Best of Everything" ==
The title track of the compilation, "The Best of Everything" was originally released in 1985 on the album Southern Accents; the song was later released in two different versions on the posthumous compilations An American Treasure (2018), and this album. The latter extended alternate version, which contains an extra verse, was released as a single in 2018, before the release of the album. The posthumous released versions have a more rocking arrangement and sound more organic (the synths were substituted with the piano), while the one on Southern Accents is more soul/pop-oriented.

== "For Real" ==
"For Real" was the previously unreleased track on the compilation, and was described as a gritty autobiographical acoustic track. It was recorded in 2000. It was released as the second single from the compilation and charted on the Adult Alternative Songs chart, peaking at #28.

== Track listing ==
All songs were written by Tom Petty, except where noted.

Disc one

1. "Free Fallin'" (Petty, Jeff Lynne) (from Full Moon Fever, 1989) – 4:15
2. "Mary Jane's Last Dance" (from Greatest Hits, 1993) – 4:32
3. "You Wreck Me" (Petty, Mike Campbell) (from Wildflowers, 1994) – 3:23
4. "I Won't Back Down" (Petty, Lynne) (from Full Moon Fever) – 2:56
5. "Saving Grace" (from Highway Companion, 2006) – 3:45
6. "You Don't Know How It Feels" (from Wildflowers) – 4:47
7. "Don't Do Me Like That" (from Damn the Torpedoes, 1979) – 2:41
8. "Listen to Her Heart" (from You're Gonna Get It!, 1978) – 3:02
9. "Breakdown" (from Tom Petty and the Heartbreakers, 1976) – 2:43
10. "Walls (Circus)" (from Songs and Music from "She's the One", 1996) – 4:24
11. "The Waiting" (from Hard Promises, 1981) – 3:57
12. "Don't Come Around Here No More" (Petty, David A. Stewart) (from Southern Accents, 1985) – 5:04
13. "Southern Accents" (from Southern Accents) – 4:43
14. "Angel Dream (No. 2)" (from Songs and Music from "She's the One") – 2:26
15. "Dreamville" (from The Last DJ, 2002) – 3:47
16. "I Should Have Known It" (from Mojo, 2010) – 3:39
17. "Refugee" (Petty, Campbell) (from Damn the Torpedoes) – 3:20
18. "American Girl" (from Tom Petty and the Heartbreakers) – 3:33
19. "The Best of Everything" (alternate version, original version from Southern Accents) – 5:26

Disc two

1. "Wildflowers" (from Wildflowers) – 3:11
2. "Learning to Fly" (Petty, Lynne) (from Into the Great Wide Open, 1991) – 4:01
3. "Here Comes My Girl" (Petty, Campbell) (from Damn the Torpedoes) – 4:24
4. "The Last DJ" (from The Last DJ) – 3:30
5. "I Need to Know" (from You're Gonna Get It!) – 2:23
6. "Scare Easy" (from Mudcrutch, 2008) – 4:36
7. "You Got Lucky" (Petty, Campbell) (from Long After Dark, 1982) – 3:32
8. "Runnin' Down a Dream" (Petty, Lynne, Campbell) (from Full Moon Fever) – 4:22
9. "American Dream Plan B" (from Hypnotic Eye, 2014) – 3:00
10. "Stop Draggin' My Heart Around" (with Stevie Nicks) (Petty, Campbell) (from Nicks' album Bella Donna, 1981) – 4:03
11. "Trailer" (from Mudcrutch 2, 2016) – 3:19
12. "Into the Great Wide Open" (Petty, Lynne) (from Into the Great Wide Open) – 3:42
13. "Room at the Top" (from Echo, 1999) – 5:01
14. "Square One" (from Highway Companion) – 3:26
15. "Jammin' Me" (Petty, Campbell, Bob Dylan) (from Let Me Up (I've Had Enough), 1987) – 4:03
16. "Even the Losers" (from Damn the Torpedoes) – 3:35
17. "Hungry No More" (from Mudcrutch 2) – 5:56
18. "I Forgive It All" (from Mudcrutch 2) – 4:14
19. "For Real" (previously unreleased, recorded in August 2000) – 3:52

The vinyl edition has four LPs:

1. LP 1: A side (disc 1, tracks 1–5)/B side (disc 1, tracks 6–10)
2. LP 2: A side (disc 1, tracks 11–15)/B side (disc 1, tracks 16–19)
3. LP 3: A side (disc 2, tracks 1–5)/B side (disc 2, tracks 6–10)
4. LP 4: A side (disc 2, tracks 11–15)/B side (disc 2, tracks 16–19)

== Personnel ==
- Tom Petty – lead and backing vocals, rhythm and lead guitars, harmonica, piano, keyboards, drums on "Saving Grace", bass guitar on "Scare Easy", "Hungry No More", and "I Forgive It All"

The Heartbreakers

- Mike Campbell – lead and rhythm guitars
- Benmont Tench – keyboards, backing vocals
- Ron Blair – bass guitar, backing vocals
- Steve Ferrone – drums, percussion
- Scott Thurston – guitars, keyboards, harmonica, backing vocals
- Howie Epstein – bass guitar, backing vocals
- Stan Lynch – drums, percussion, backing vocals

Mudcrutch

- Mike Campbell – lead guitar
- Tom Leadon – guitar and backing vocals on "Scare Easy", "Hungry No More", and "I Forgive It All"
- Randall Marsh – drums, percussion and backing vocals on "Scare Easy", "Hungry No More", and "I Forgive It All"
- Benmont Tench – keyboards, backing vocals

Additional musicians

- Lindsey Buckingham – backing vocals on "Walls (Circus)"
- Lenny Castro – percussion
- Donald "Duck" Dunn – bass guitar on "Stop Draggin' My Heart Around"
- George Harrison – backing vocals and acoustic guitar on "I Won't Back Down"
- Phil Jones – percussion, drums on "Full Moon Fever" tracks
- Jeff Jourard – electric guitar on "Breakdown"
- Jeff Lynne – bass guitar, guitar, keyboards and backing vocals on Full Moon Fever, Into The Great Wide Open, and Highway Companion tracks
- Stevie Nicks – lead and backing vocals on "Stop Draggin' My Heart Around"
- Lori Perry, Sharon Celani – backing vocals on "Stop Draggin' My Heart Around"
- Phil Seymour - background and harmony vocals on "American Girl" and "Breakdown"

Production

- Bill Bottrell
- Mike Campbell
- Denny Cordell
- George Drakoulias
- Jimmy Iovine
- Jeff Lynne
- Tom Petty
- Robbie Robertson
- Dave Stewart
- Rick Rubin
- Noah Shark

== Charts ==
=== Weekly charts ===
Weekly chart performance of The Best of Everything
Chart (2019)	Peak position
Australian Albums (ARIA)	73
Austrian Albums (Ö3 Austria)	60
Belgian Albums (Ultratop Flanders)	55
Belgian Albums (Ultratop Wallonia)	42
Canadian Albums (Billboard)	45
German Albums (Offizielle Top 100)	24
Irish Albums (IRMA)	22
Scottish Albums (Official Charts)	10
Spanish Albums (PROMUSICAE)	52
Swiss Albums (Schweizer Hitparade)	42
UK Albums (Official Charts)	38
US Billboard 200	16
US Top Rock Albums (Billboard)	3

=== Year-end charts ===
Year-end performance of The Best of Everything
Chart (2019)	Position
US Top Rock Albums (Billboard)	40

== Certifications ==
Certifications for The Best of Everything
Region	Certification	Certified units/sales
United Kingdom (BPI)	Silver	60,000^{‡}
^{‡} Sales+streaming figures based on certification alone.
