= List of awards and nominations received by Tom Petty =

Tom Petty awards and nominations
Awards and nominations
Award	Wins	Nominations
American Music Awards	0	1
Billboard	1	1
Grammy	3	18
MTV VMA	3	10
Radio Music Awards	1	1

Totals (Note: Certain award groups do not simply award one winner. They acknowledge several different recipients, have runners-up, and have third place. Since this is a specific recognition and is different from losing an award, runner-up mentions are considered wins in this award tally. For simplification and to avoid errors, each award in this list has been presumed to have had a prior nomination.)
- Wins: 8
- Nominations: 30

Tom Petty was a rock artist who released 10 studio albums as Tom Petty and the Heartbreakers, three solo albums, two albums with Mudcrutch, and two albums as part of the supergroup The Traveling Wilburys.

== American Music Awards ==
The American Music Awards are awarded annually by votes of music buyers and the general public. Petty received one nomination, in 1990.

Year	Nominee / work	Award	Result
1990	Traveling Wilburys Vol. 1	Favourite Pop/Rock New Artist	Nominated

== Billboard Music Awards ==
The Billboard Music Awards are sponsored by Billboard magazine and is held annually in December. Tom Petty won one award.

Year	Nominee / work	Award	Result
2005	Tom Petty	Billboard Century Award	Won

== Grammy Awards ==
The Grammy Awards are awarded annually by the National Academy of Recording Arts and Sciences of the United States. Tom Petty has received three awards from 18 nominations. MusiCares honored Tom Petty as MusiCares Person of the Year in 2017.

Year	Act	Nominated work	Award	Result
1982	Stevie Nicks with Tom Petty and the Heartbreakers	"Stop Draggin' My Heart Around" (with Stevie Nicks)	Best Rock Performance by a Duo or Group with Vocal	Nominated
1990	Tom Petty	Full Moon Fever	Album of the Year	Nominated
1990	Tom Petty	"Free Fallin'"	Best Rock Vocal Performance - Male	Nominated
1990	Traveling Wilburys	Traveling Wilburys Vol. 1	Album of the Year	Nominated
1990	Traveling Wilburys	Traveling Wilburys Vol. 1	Best Rock Vocal Performance by a Duo or Group	Won
1992	Tom Petty	"Learning to Fly" (as songwriting with Jeff Lynne)	Best Rock Song	Nominated
1992	Tom Petty	"Into the Great Wide Open"	Best Rock Vocal Performance by a Duo or Group	Nominated
1994	Bob Dylan, Roger McGuinn, Tom Petty, Neil Young, Eric Clapton, George Harrison	"My Back Pages" (with Bob Dylan, Roger McGuinn, Neil Young, Eric Clapton and George Harrison)	Best Rock Performance by a Duo or Group with Vocal	Nominated
1996	Tom Petty	"You Don't Know How It Feels"	Best Rock Vocal Performance - Male	Won
1996	Tom Petty	Wildflowers	Best Rock Album	Nominated
1999	Tom Petty and the Heartbreakers	"Room at The Top"	Best Rock Song	Nominated
1999	Tom Petty and the Heartbreakers	Echo	Best Rock Album	Nominated
2006	Tom Petty	"Square One" (from Elizabethtown)	Best Song Written for a Motion Picture, Television or Other Visual Media	Nominated
2007	Tom Petty	"Saving Grace"	Best Solo Rock Vocal Performance	Nominated
2007	Tom Petty	Highway Companion	Best Rock Album	Nominated
2009	Tom Petty and the Heartbreakers	"Runnin' Down a Dream"	Best Music Video, Long Form	Won
2011	Tom Petty and the Heartbreakers	Mojo	Best Rock Album	Nominated
2015	Tom Petty and the Heartbreakers	Hypnotic Eye	Best Rock Album	Nominated

== MTV Video Music Awards ==
The MTV Video Music Awards is an annual awards ceremony established in 1984 by MTV.

Year	Act	Nominated work	Award	Result
1985	Tom Petty and the Heartbreakers	"Don't Come Around Here No More"	Best Special Effects	Won
1985	Tom Petty and the Heartbreakers	"Don't Come Around Here No More"	Video of the Year	Nominated
1985	Tom Petty and the Heartbreakers	"Don't Come Around Here No More"	Viewer's Choice	Nominated
1985	Tom Petty and the Heartbreakers	"Don't Come Around Here No More"	Best Direction	Nominated
1985	Tom Petty and the Heartbreakers	"Don't Come Around Here No More"	Best Concept Video	Nominated
1989	Traveling Wilburys	"Handle with Care"	Best Group Video	Nominated
1992	Tom Petty and the Heartbreakers	"Into the Great Wide Open"	Best Male Video	Nominated
1994	Tom Petty and the Heartbreakers	"Mary Jane's Last Dance"	Best Male Video	Won
1995	Tom Petty	"You Don't Know How It Feels"	Best Male Video	Won
2009	Tom Petty and the Heartbreakers	"Into the Great Wide Open"	Best Video (That Should Have Won a Moonman)	Nominated

== Radio Music Awards ==
The Radio Music Awards are an annual award show that honors the year's most successful songs on mainstream radio.

Year	Nominated work	Award	Result
2003	Tom Petty	Legend Award	Won
