= An American Treasure =

2018 Tom Petty compilation album

Box set by Tom Petty
- Released: September 28, 2018
- Recorded: 1974–2016
- Genre: Heartland rock
- Length: 244:54
- Language: English
- Label: Reprise
- Compilers: Mike Campbell; Adria Petty; Dana Petty; Benmont Tench; Ryan Ulyate

Tom Petty chronology
Mudcrutch 2 (2016)	An American Treasure (2018)	The Best of Everything (2019)

Singles from An American Treasure
- 1. "Keep a Little Soul" Released: July 11, 2018; 2. "You And Me (Clubhouse Version)" Released: August 23, 2018; 3. "Gainesville" Released: September 20, 2018

An American Treasure is a 2018 compilation album and box set of Tom Petty, Tom Petty and the Heartbreakers and Mudcrutch released by Reprise Records on September 28, 2018. The set includes several rare and unreleased songs alongside more obscure album tracks that showcase Petty's songwriting. The majority of the content is Heartbreakers material but there are also several solo songs and some recordings by Mudcrutch. Critical reception has been positive.

== Compilation and release ==
The recordings were chosen for remixing and remastering by Mike Campbell, Adria Petty, Dana Petty, Benmont Tench, and Ryan Ulyate. The goal for compiling the songs was to highlight lesser-known tracks and choose songs that Petty himself would prefer.

Petty's daughter Adria made a promotional music video for the track "Keep a Little Soul" using home movies.

== Reception ==
Professional ratings
Aggregate scores
Source	Rating
Metacritic	89/100
Review scores
Source	Rating
AllMusic	4.5/5 stars
All About Jazz	4.5/5 stars
Classic Rock	4.5/5 stars
The Irish Times	4/5 stars
Mojo	4/5 stars
Pitchfork	8.3/10
PopMatters	9/10
Rolling Stone	4/5 stars
Uncut	8/10
Under the Radar	9/10

The box set has an 89 out of 100 on Metacritic, indicating universal acclaim. Writing for Uproxx, Steven Hyden called the compilation "especially refreshing" for focusing on alternative recordings and more obscure songs from Petty's catalogue, summing it up as, "a surprisingly good introduction for neophytes, no matter the dearth of hits". Stephen Thomas Erlewine of AllMusic gave the compilation 4.5 out of five stars, writing, "this box winds up as a fitting tribute to a rocker whose touch was so casual, he could be easy to take for granted, but when his work is looked at as a whole, he seems like a giant".

== Track listing ==
All tracks written by Tom Petty, except where noted.

=== Standard version ===
The standard version of An American Treasure features 26 songs spread evenly across two CDs. Of the 26 songs, 21 are previously non-album outtakes, rarities, alternate mixes/takes, or live versions.

Disc 1
No.	Title	Track source	Length
1.	"Rockin’ Around (With You)" (Mike Campbell, Tom Petty)	Tom Petty and the Heartbreakers, 1976	2:19
2.	"Anything That's Rock ‘n Roll"	Live at Capitol Studios, November 11, 1977	3:37
3.	"Listen to Her Heart"	Live at Record Plant Studios, April 23, 1977	3:19
4.	"Louisiana Rain"	Alternate version, 1979	5:04
5.	"Here Comes My Girl"	Alternate version. 1979	4:57
6.	"King's Road"	Live at The Forum, June 28, 1981	5:13
7.	"Keep a Little Soul"	Outtake from Long After Dark, 1982	3:08
8.	"Straight into Darkness"	Alternate version, 1982	4:29
9.	"Don't Treat Me Like a Stranger"	B-side to "I Won't Back Down", 1989	3:05
10.	"Rebels"	Alternate version, 1985	5:18
11.	"You’re Gonna Get It"	Alternate version featuring strings, 1978	3:14
12.	"Walkin’ from the Fire"	Outtake from Southern Accents, 1984	4:44
13.	"The Best of Everything"	Alternate version, 1985	4:02

Disc 2
No.	Title	Track source	Length
1.	"I Won't Back Down"	Live at The Fillmore, February 4, 1997	3:39
2.	"Two Gunslingers"	Live at Beacon Theatre, May 25, 2013	3:50
3.	"Crawling Back to You"	Wildflowers, 1994	5:02
4.	"Wake Up Time"	Alternate take from Wildflowers, 1992	5:30
5.	"Accused of Love"	Echo, 1999	2:44
6.	"Gainesville"	Outtake from Echo, 1998	4:05
7.	"You and Me"	Clubhouse version, 2007	3:13
8.	"Like a Diamond"	Alternate version, 2002	4:15
9.	"Southern Accents"	Live at O’Connell Center, September 21, 2006	5:02
10.	"Insider"	Live at O’Connell Center, September 21, 2006	4:56
11.	"Something Good Coming"	Mojo, 2010	4:10
12.	"Have Love Will Travel"	The Last DJ, 2002	4:05
13.	"Hungry No More"	Live at Boston House of Blues, June 15, 2016	7:17

=== Deluxe version ===
The deluxe version of An American Treasure features 60 songs (plus one radio promo spot and two concert dialogue snippets, for a total of 63 tracks) spread across four CDs. It is also available on vinyl as a six-LP set. Of the 60 songs, 42 are previously non-album outtakes, rarities, alternate mixes/takes, demos or live versions.

Disc 1
No.	Title	Track source	Length
1.	"Surrender"	Outtake from Tom Petty and the Heartbreakers, 1976	3:18
2.	"Listen to Her Heart"	Live at Record Plant Studios, April 23, 1977	3:19
3.	"Anything That's Rock ‘n Roll"	Live at Capitol Studios, November 11, 1977	3:37
4.	"When the Time Comes"	You’re Gonna Get It!, 1978	3:04
5.	"You’re Gonna Get It"	Alternate version featuring strings, 1978	3:14
6.	"Radio promotion spot, 1977"		0:27
7.	"Rockin’ Around (With You)" (Mike Campbell, Tom Petty)	Tom Petty and the Heartbreakers, 1976	2:19
8.	"Fooled Again (I Don't Like It)"	Alternate version, 1976	4:10
9.	"Breakdown"	Live at Capitol Studios, November 11, 1977	5:21
10.	"The Wild One, Forever"	Tom Petty and the Heartbreakers, 1976	3:00
11.	"No Second Thoughts"	You’re Gonna Get It!, 1978	2:39
12.	"Here Comes My Girl"	Alternate version. 1979	4:57
13.	"What Are You Doing in My Life"	Alternate version, 1979	3:30
14.	"Louisiana Rain"	Alternate version, 1979	5:04
15.	"Lost in Your Eyes" (Performed by Mudcrutch, 1974)		4:47

Disc 2
No.	Title	Track source	Length
1.	"Keep a Little Soul"	Outtake from Long After Dark, 1982	3:08
2.	"Even the Losers"	Live at Rochester Community War Memorial, 1989	3:31
3.	"Keeping Me Alive"	Outtake from Long After Dark, 1982	3:17
4.	"Don't Treat Me Like a Stranger"	B-side to "I Won't Back Down", 1989	3:05
5.	"The Apartment Song"	Demo recording, 1984	2:34
6.	"Concert intro by Kareem Abdul-Jabbar"	Live at The Forum, June 28, 1981	0:10
7.	"King's Road"	Live at The Forum, June 28, 1981	5:13
8.	"Clear the aisles (Concert announcement)"	Live at The Forum, June 28, 1981	0:16
9.	"A Woman in Love (It's Not Me)"	Live at The Forum, June 28, 1981	5:51
10.	"Straight into Darkness"	Alternate version, 1982	4:29
11.	"You Can Still Change Your Mind"	Hard Promises, 1981	4:01
12.	"Rebels"	Alternate version, 1985	5:18
13.	"Deliver Me"	Alternate version, 1982	3:55
14.	"Alright for Now"	Full Moon Fever, 1989	2:00
15.	"The Damage You’ve Done"	Alternate version, 1987	3:59
16.	"The Best of Everything"	Alternate version, 1985	4:02
17.	"Walkin’ from the Fire"	Outtake from Southern Accents, 1984	4:44
18.	"King of the Hill"	Early take, 1987	4:00

Disc 3
No.	Title	Track source	Length
1.	"I Won't Back Down"	Live at The Fillmore, February 4, 1997	3:39
2.	"Gainesville"	Outtake from Echo, 1998	4:05
3.	"You and I Will Meet Again"	Into the Great Wide Open, 1991	3:38
4.	"Into the Great Wide Open"	Live at Oakland Coliseum, November 24, 1991	4:15
5.	"Two Gunslingers"	Live at Beacon Theatre, May 25, 2013	3:50
6.	"Lonesome Dave"	Outtake from Wildflowers, 1994	3:40
7.	"To Find a Friend"	Wildflowers, 1994	3:19
8.	"Crawling Back to You"	Wildflowers, 1994	5:02
9.	"Wake Up Time"	Alternate take from Wildflowers, 1992	5:30
10.	"Grew Up Fast"	Songs and Music from "She's the One", 1996	5:05
11.	"I Don't Belong"	Outtake from Echo, 1998	2:54
12.	"Accused of Love"	Echo, 1999	2:44
13.	"Lonesome Sundown"	Echo, 1999	4:31
14.	"Don't Fade on Me" (Mike Campbell, Tom Petty)	Alternate take from Wildflowers, 1994	4:28

Disc 4
No.	Title	Track source	Length
1.	"You and Me"	Clubhouse version, 2007	3:13
2.	"Have Love Will Travel"	The Last DJ, 2002	4:05
3.	"Money Becomes King"	The Last DJ, 2002	5:11
4.	"Bus to Tampa Bay"	Outtake from Hypnotic Eye, 2011	2:55
5.	"Saving Grace"	Live at Malibu Performing Arts Center, July 26, 2006	3:30
6.	"Down South"	Highway Companion, 2006	3:25
7.	"Southern Accents"	Live at O’Connell Center, September 21, 2006	5:02
8.	"Insider"	Live at O’Connell Center, September 21, 2006	4:56
9.	"Two Men Talking"	Outtake from Hypnotic Eye, 2012	6:53
10.	"Fault Lines"	Hypnotic Eye, 2014	4:28
11.	"Sins of My Youth"	Early take, 2012	3:39
12.	"Good Enough"	Alternate version, 2012	5:48
13.	"Something Good Coming"	Mojo, 2010	4:10
14.	"Save Your Water" (Performed by Mudcrutch)	Mudcrutch 2, 2016	3:17
15.	"Like a Diamond"	Alternate version, 2002	4:15
16.	"Hungry No More"	Live at Boston House of Blues, June 15, 2016	7:17

== Personnel ==
Tom Petty and the Heartbreakers

- Ron Blair – bass guitar, backing vocals (1976–1982, 2002–2017)
- Mike Campbell – lead guitar, bass guitar (1976–2017)
- Howie Epstein – bass guitar, rhythm guitar, backing vocals (1982–2002)
- Steve Ferrone – drums (1994–2017)
- Stan Lynch – drums, backing vocals (1976–1994)
- Tom Petty – lead vocals, rhythm guitar, lead guitar, bass guitar, harmonica, keyboards, ukulele (1976–2017)
- Benmont Tench – keyboards, backing vocals (1976–2017)
- Scott Thurston – rhythm guitar, keyboards, harmonica, bass guitar, backing vocals (1991–2017)

Mudcrutch

- Mike Campbell – lead guitar, backing vocals (1970–1975, 2007–2016)
- Tom Leadon – rhythm guitar, backing vocals (1970–1972, 2007–2016)
- Randall Marsh – drums (1970–1975, 2007–2016), announcer on "Radio Promotion Spot"
- Tom Petty – lead vocals, bass guitar, guitar (1970–1975, 2007–2016)
- Danny Roberts – bass guitar, backing vocals (1972–1975)
- Benmont Tench – keyboards, backing vocals (1972–1975, 2007–2016)

Additional musicians

- Kareem Abdul-Jabbar – concert introduction
- Jeff Lynne – backing vocals, bass guitar, keyboards on "Down South"
- Roger McGuinn – guitar, vocals on "King of the Hill"
- Stevie Nicks – vocals on "The Apartment Song", "Insider", and "You Can Still Change Your Mind"
- Sharon Celani – backing vocals on "You Can Still Change Your Mind"
- Ringo Starr – drums on "To Find a Friend"
- Jeff Jourard – electric guitar on "Fooled Again (I Don't Like It)"

Technical personnel

- Chris Bellman – mastering
- Nicholas Dawidoff – liner notes
- Shepard Fairey – cover art
- Mark Seliger – photography
- Ryan Ulyate – mixing

== Charts ==
=== Weekly charts ===
Sales chart performance of An American Treasure
Chart (2018)	Peak position
Australian Albums (ARIA)	80
Austrian Albums (Ö3 Austria)	46
Belgian Albums (Ultratop Flanders)	50
Belgian Albums (Ultratop Wallonia)	103
Canadian Albums (Billboard)	43
Czech Albums (ČNS IFPI)	71
Dutch Albums (Album Top 100)	89
German Albums (Offizielle Top 100)	9
Hungarian Albums (MAHASZ)	32
Irish Albums (IRMA)	54
Italian Albums (FIMI)	80
Scottish Albums (Official Charts)	20
Spanish Albums (PROMUSICAE)	9
Swedish Albums (Sverigetopplistan)	38
Swiss Albums (Schweizer Hitparade)	37
UK Albums (Official Charts)	38
US Billboard 200	9
US Top Rock Albums (Billboard)	1

=== Year-end charts ===
Year-end chart performance of An American Treasure
Chart (2018)	Position
US Top Rock Albums (Billboard)	86

The single "Keep a Little Soul" peaked at #3 on the Adult Alternative Songs chart.
