= Surrender (Tom Petty song) =

Promotional single by Tom Petty and the Heartbreakers
- Genre: Rock; hard rock; power pop
- Length: 2:54 (Anthology: Through the Years); 3:26 (Damn the Torpedoes); 3:11 (The Live Anthology); 3:18 (An American Treasure)
- Songwriter(s): Tom Petty
- Producer(s): Denny Cordell (1976); Jimmy Iovine (1979); Bill Bottrell (2000); Tom Petty

"Surrender" is a song by American rock band Tom Petty and the Heartbreakers. The song has been recorded multiple times over the years but has never been included on a studio album. The song was first released in 2000 as a radio single from the compilation Anthology: Through the Years, and then a live version was available on The Live Anthology. A studio recording from the Damn the Torpedoes sessions was made available on the reissue of the album in 2010. In 2018, a version originally recorded in 1976 was released on the deluxe version of An American Treasure.

== Personnel ==
An American Treasure & Damn the Torpedoes (Deluxe Edition)

- Tom Petty – vocals, rhythm guitar
- Ron Blair – bass guitar
- Mike Campbell – guitar
- Stan Lynch – drums, vocals
- Benmont Tench – keyboards, vocals

The Live Anthology

- Tom Petty – vocals, rhythm guitar
- Mike Campbell – guitar
- Howie Epstein – bass guitar, vocals
- Stan Lynch – drums, vocals
- Benmont Tench – keyboards, vocals

Anthology: Through the Years

- Tom Petty – vocals, rhythm guitar
- Mike Campbell – guitar
- Howie Epstein – bass guitar, vocals
- Steve Ferrone – drums
- Benmont Tench – keyboards
- Scott Thurston – guitar, backing vocals
- Lenny Castro – percussion
