= How I Spent My Strummer Vacation =

- The Simpsons episode
- Promotional artwork for the episode, featuring (L to R) Elvis Costello, Tom Petty, Keith Richards, Homer Simpson, Mick Jagger, Lenny Kravitz, and Brian Setzer
- Episode no.: Season 14; Episode 2
- Directed by: Mike B. Anderson
- Written by: Mike Scully
- Production code: DABF22
- Original air date: November 10, 2002

Guest appearances
- Elvis Costello, Mick Jagger, Lenny Kravitz, Tom Petty, Keith Richards, and Brian Setzer as themselves

Episode features
- Couch gag: The living room is in an ocean. Homer is on water skis, with the others on him, as he ski-jumps over sharks; everybody lands on the couch, but Homer’s legs are in the mouth of the sharks.
- Commentary: Matt Groening; Mike Scully; Al Jean; Ian Maxtone-Graham; Matt Selman; John Frink; Dana Gould; Tom Gammill; Dan Castellaneta; Mike B. Anderson; Steven Dean Moore; Michael Price

Episode chronology
← Previous "Treehouse of Horror XIII"	Next → "Bart vs. Lisa vs. the Third Grade"
- The Simpsons season 14

"How I Spent My Strummer Vacation" is the second episode of the fourteenth season of the American animated television series The Simpsons. It first aired on the Fox network in the United States on November 10, 2002. It was intended to be the season premiere, but "Treehouse of Horror XIII" was moved ahead for Halloween.

This episode was heavily promoted due to its list of high-profile guest stars, and was the last episode written by Mike Scully until season 35's "Iron Marge" in 2023.

Production-wise, this episode is also the last to use traditional cel animation. Three weeks later, "Helter Shelter" became the last traditional cel-animated episode to air.

== Plot ==
On a visit to Moe's, Homer has no money to pay for his beer and Moe will not give him any freebies. As a result, he goes around town trying other things to feel drunk, such as breathing thin air on top of a mountain, licking toads, and giving blood. Moe feels guilty about refusing to serve Homer and gives him a free beer, but Homer is already heavily intoxicated. Moe, Lenny and Carl put Homer in a taxi to take him home. In the cab, he is secretly videotaped for a reality show called Taxicab Conversations, and says some unpleasant things about Marge and the kids, as well as revealing his dream of becoming a rock star.

His family is not impressed with him, but soon realize that they do somewhat burden him. To make up for this, the family takes Homer to a Rock 'n Roll Fantasy Camp, run by the Rolling Stones. At the camp, Homer and a bunch of other Springfield citizens learn about rock music, from instructors Mick Jagger and Keith Richards, Elvis Costello, Lenny Kravitz, Tom Petty, and Brian Setzer. Finally, the wannabe rockstars have a mock rock concert, with Homer as the lead guitarist and singer.

When Homer learns that the camp is just a one-week-only camp, he is bitterly disappointed and refuses to leave. Jagger eventually placates Homer by offering him a chance to perform at a benefit gig, the "Concert for Planet Hollywood". An excited Homer gets passes for his friends so they can see him at the concert. Homer's glee turns to embarrassment when he is asked to perform the duties of a roadie. When he goes on stage to test the microphone, seeing his family and friends out there rooting for him, he sings a rock song and steals the show. This angers the rock stars, who attempt to run Homer off the stage with a big mobile fire-breathing devil's head. The devil's head goes out of control and plows into the audience.

The performers, feeling sorry about their actions, offer Homer an opportunity to perform at another benefit concert (for the victims of the recently messed-up gig), but he declines and prefers to perform at home instead. However, at the end of the episode, he replaces his car with the big devil's head (given to him by the band) using it to take Bart and Lisa to school. Principal Skinner tells Homer that he is not allowed to stop his car in the school bus zone. In retaliation, Homer activates the devil's fire breath, burning off Skinner's clothes (revealing his pink boxers that says "Mama's Boy"), much to the delight of the kids.

== Cultural references ==
The cab videotaping Homer is a parody of Taxicab Confessions. The couch gag is a visual pun of the slang term "jump the shark", which describes when a TV show has reached its creative peak and is slowly declining in quality.

When the camp is over, Mick Jagger tells Homer to cheer up, "it's only rock and roll camp", and Homer responds, "but I like it." This is in reference to the Rolling Stones song "It's Only Rock 'n Roll (But I Like It)". The songs include "Rip This Joint", "Start Me Up", and "She's So Cold", all by the Rolling Stones; "Are You Gonna Go My Way" by Lenny Kravitz; "Pump It Up" by Elvis Costello; and "The Last DJ" by Tom Petty and The Heartbreakers.

The episode title is a reference to a short essay that many children are asked to write upon returning to school after the summer vacation.

== Reception ==
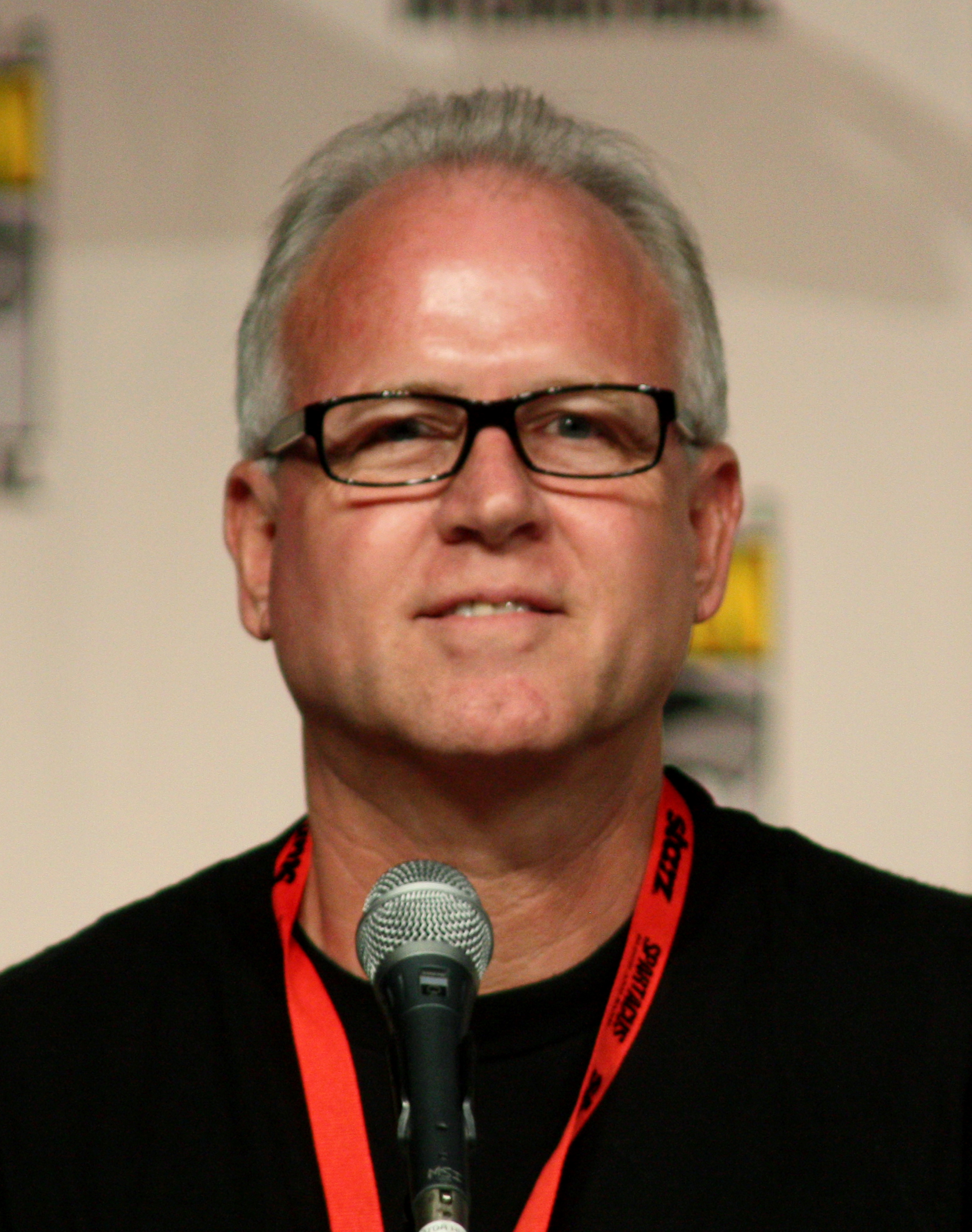
Mike B. Anderson (pictured) directed the episode.

In 2003, Annie Alleman of The Herald News named the episode her all-time favorite Simpsons episode.

The same year, writers of Entertainment Weekly listed it as the twenty-second best Simpsons episode. They elaborated that "You've gotta admire a show that lands the greatest names in rock and then gives them as much respect as a brown M&M. [...] While rockers have always shone in 'Simpsons' solos, the Stones so giddily mock their hall-of-fame status it makes "Strummer" the series' Woodstock: a classic-rock show even Disco Stu could get behind."

Robert Canning of IGN in a Flashback Review gave the episode an 8.6 saying it was "Great" and also stated "In a season that I generally see as ho-hum ("Pray Anything" is the only other episode I rate highly), "How I Spent My Strummer Vacation" simply rocks". In 2007, Simon Crerar of The Times listed Mick Jagger, Keith Richards, Elvis Costello and Lenny Kravitz's performances among the thirty-three funniest cameos in the history of the show.

In 2011, Kravitz revealed that his greatest achievement was the appearance on The Simpsons in the eyes of his young relatives. He explained that "To my nieces and nephews appearing on 'The Simpsons' was when I actually made it. All the other stuff doesn't count."

New York magazine named the episode one of the top ten later Simpsons episodes.
