= Scare Easy =

Single by Mudcrutch

from the album Mudcrutch
- A-side: "Scare Easy"
- Released: 2008
- Recorded: 2007
- Genre: Southern rock
- Label: Reprise
- Songwriter: Tom Petty
- Producers: Tom Petty, Mike Campbell, Ryan Ulyate

Mudcrutch track listing
- 1. "Shady Grove"; 2. "Scare Easy"; 3. "Orphan of the Storm"; 4. "Six Days on the Road"; 5. "Crystal River"; 6. "Oh Maria"; 7. "This Is a Good Street"; 8. "The Wrong Thing to Do"; 9. "Queen of the Go-Go Girls"; 10. "June Apple"; 11. "Lover of the Bayou"; 12. "Topanga Cowgirl"; 13. "Bootleg Flyer"; 14. "House of Stone"

"Scare Easy" is a song written and sung by Tom Petty, featured on the debut album by rock band Mudcrutch, featuring Petty and Mike Campbell. The song was used in a 2008 commercial for My Name Is Earl. The song peaked at No. 4 on the Billboard chart.

"Scare Easy" was described as "full of the tones and lyrics of the mid-1970s, but the tight harmonies come from musicians who have matured."

The song can also be heard over the end credits of the film Appaloosa (2008), a Western directed and starring Ed Harris and co-starring Viggo Mortensen and Renée Zellweger. "Scare Easy" does not appear on the official soundtrack for the film.

== Personnel ==
- Mike Campbell – guitar, mandolin
- Tom Leadon – guitar, vocals
- Randall Marsh – drums
- Tom Petty – bass, vocals
- Benmont Tench – keyboards, vocals
