= Robert Deyber =

American artist (1955–2021)

- Born: Robert Donald Deyber, Jr. August 13, 1955; Greenwich, Connecticut, US
- Died: September 20, 2021 (aged 66); Roxbury, Connecticut, US
- Other name: Bob Deyber
- Occupation: Painter
- Years active: 1965 - 2021
- Height: 6 ft 3 in (191 cm)
- Spouse: Robert Graham
- Website: robertdeyber.com

Robert Deyber (August 13, 1955 - September 20, 2021) was an American artist best known for literal visual portrayals of cliches, euphemisms, and idioms from the English and other languages. The San Francisco Examiner in 2009 described him as a "pop surrealist" whose style "has appeal for new as well as experienced collectors."

His work relates to that of Thomas Cole and Frederic Church of the Hudson River School, surrealists like Salvador Dalí and René Magritte, naive painter Henri Rousseau, the colorists Henri Matisse and Marc Chagall, and Andy Warhol.

Deyber painted his own scenes from the prose that peppers the English lexicon. His works range from literal translations of fanciful sayings to kitschy depictions of everyday terminology.

== Early life ==
Robert grew up in Greenwich, Connecticut, his mother Janice (1925–1971) a talented portrait artist and fashion model who died when Deyber was sixteen, his father Robert Deyber Sr (1914–1989), a real estate broker and POW, survivor of the Bataan Death March.

Deyber began painting and drawing in his teens, and continued to develop a style that was original and surreal, drawing inspiration from the cultures that surrounded him as he lived in various parts of the country, from New York City to San Francisco. Deyber eventually wound up in Perugia and Milan, Italy where he studied and observed the works of Giotto di Bondone and other Italian painters.

His early work from the 1980s and 1990s involves work that he describes as neo-surrealism or surreal American mythology. While he continued to develop and show his work, he was an executive in the airline industry, which allowed him to travel all over the world, exposing himself to art in many museums. He continued for twenty years to exhibit his work in the Boston area.

== Later activities ==
After leaving the airline industry in 2001, Deyber moved to Atlanta, Georgia to be closer to his siblings. It was at that time that he began to focus on his artistic career and began exhibiting his work in the surrounding areas. With much success, his work began to grow in popularity, and he soon was represented in many surrounding and distant states.

By 2004, Deyber had been selling works around the world and had collectors in 27 countries. At the time he was self-published and selling original paintings and prints through many galleries across the country and was routinely featured in the Artful Home catalog. He opened a contemporary fine-art gallery in Roswell, Georgia, "Iridium Gallery", which featured his own works and those of about a dozen other artists. He later sold the gallery and began selling works directly from his studio and website and other larger galleries in the Atlanta area.

After singer-songwriter Tom Petty and his wife Dana began collecting his work, Petty commissioned Deyber for the artwork of his album Highway Companion, which was released in 2006.

In March 2006, Deyber exhibited his work at the New York International Art Expo, gaining significant attention for his work and gathering dozens of galleries to represent his work. After meeting the owner of Chalk & Vermilion at the Expo, Robert has been exclusively represented by the firm and its network of galleries across the country, Martin Lawrence Galleries.

In 2008, Deyber moved back to Connecticut, settling in Litchfield. then New Milford and finally in Roxbury, CT.

While Deyber's preferred medium of artistic expression was painting, he did produce some three-dimensional sculpture pieces and had many sketches and plans for installation work.

== Death ==
Deyber, 66, died on September 20, 2021, at home in Roxbury, CT of suicide by asphyxiation. Deyber's declining health, especially degenerative spinal disease causing intolerable back pain, combined with rapidly worsening depression and anxiety, were factors, having lasted for decades. Deyber wrote in deep regret that he had reached the point where he could no longer continue.

== Primary sources ==
- Deyber, Robert. "A Language All His Own". Jenkintown Press, 2008.
