= Extended Play Live =

Mudcrutch Extended Play Live

EP by Mudcrutch
- Released: November 11, 2008
- Recorded: California, April 20 – May 2, 2008
- Genre: Rock, country rock
- Length: 27:50
- Label: Reprise
- Producer: Tom Petty, Mike Campbell, Ryan Ulyate

Mudcrutch chronology
Mudcrutch (2008)	Mudcrutch Extended Play Live (2008)	2 (2016)

Professional ratings
Review scores
Source	Rating
AllMusic	3.5/5 stars

Extended Play Live is a live EP released by Mudcrutch in November 2008 on Reprise Records. It was recorded during the band's 2008 tour to promote their first album Mudcrutch. The EP was released on CD and vinyl.

== Track listing ==
All songs were written by Tom Petty, except where noted.

1. "The Wrong Thing to Do" – 4:46
2. "Bootleg Flyer" (Petty, Mike Campbell) – 4:01
3. "Crystal River" – 15:00
4. "High School Confidential" (Ron Hargrave, Jerry Lee Lewis) – 4:01
- Tracks 1 and 2 recorded April 20, 2008, at the Ventura Theatre, Ventura, California.
- Track 3 recorded April 28, 2008, at The Troubadour, West Hollywood, California.
- Track 4 recorded May 2, 2008, at The Troubadour, West Hollywood, California.

== Personnel ==
- Tom Petty – bass guitar, vocals
- Mike Campbell – guitar, mandolin
- Tom Leadon – acoustic guitar, vocals
- Benmont Tench – organ, piano, vocals
- Randall Marsh – drums

=== Other personnel ===
- Dennis Callahan – photography
- Ryan Corey – design
- Kevin Scanlon – cover photo
- Ryan Ulyate – engineer, mixing
