= Mudcrutch (album) =

Studio album by Mudcrutch
- Released: April 29, 2008
- Recorded: August 2007
- Studio: The Clubhouse, Los Angeles
- Genre: Southern rock, country rock
- Length: 56:53
- Label: Reprise
- Producer: Tom Petty, Mike Campbell, Ryan Ulyate

Mudcrutch chronology
Mudcrutch (2008)	Extended Play Live (2008)

Tom Petty chronology
Highway Companion (2006)	Mudcrutch (2008)	The Live Anthology (2009)

Professional ratings
Aggregate scores
Source	Rating
Metacritic	79/100
Review scores
Source	Rating
AllMusic	4/5 stars
Consequence of Sound	C−
Entertainment Weekly	B+
Mojo	4/5 stars
Now	4/5
Q	3/5 stars
Rolling Stone	4/5 stars

Mudcrutch is the first studio album by American rock band Mudcrutch, released on April 29, 2008. The album was recorded during a two-week period in August 2007. Mudcrutch had originally been formed in 1970; the band recorded several demos and singles but never released a full album. Mudcrutch was disbanded by the record company in 1975 and did not play together again until recording this album 32 years later. After the initial break-up, band members Tom Petty, Mike Campbell and Benmont Tench went on to form Tom Petty and the Heartbreakers.

The album entered the U.S. Billboard 200 chart at No. 8, selling about 38,000 copies in its first week.

== Track listing ==
No.	Title	Writer(s)	Length
1.	"Shady Grove"	Traditional; arranged by Mudcrutch	3:58
2.	"Scare Easy"	Tom Petty	4:35
3.	"Orphan of the Storm"	Petty	4:07
4.	"Six Days on the Road"	Earl Green, Carl Montgomery	3:28
5.	"Crystal River"	Petty	9:29
6.	"Oh Maria"	Petty	3:43
7.	"This Is a Good Street"	Benmont Tench	1:54
8.	"The Wrong Thing to Do"	Petty	4:10
9.	"Queen of the Go-Go Girls"	Tom Leadon	3:42
10.	"June Apple"	Traditional; arranged by Mudcrutch	2:25
11.	"Lover of the Bayou"	Roger McGuinn, Jacques Levy	4:32
12.	"Topanga Cowgirl"	Petty	3:54
13.	"Bootleg Flyer"	Petty, Mike Campbell	3:48
14.	"House of Stone"	Petty	3:00
Total length:			56:45

Bonus tracks
No.	Title	Writer(s)	Length
15.	"Special Place" (iTunes bonus track)	Petty	4:41
16.	"Scare Easy" (iTunes bonus video)	Petty	4:40
17.	"The Wrong Thing to Do" (iTunes bonus video)	Petty	4:06

== Personnel ==
Mudcrutch

- Tom Petty – bass guitar, lead vocals (except where noted), backing vocals
- Mike Campbell – guitar (right speaker), mandolin
- Tom Leadon – guitar (left speaker), harmony vocals, lead vocal on "Queen of the Go-Go Girls", co-lead vocal on "Shady Grove"
- Benmont Tench – piano, organ, lead vocal on "This Is a Good Street"
- Randall Marsh – drums

Technical personnel

- Tom Petty – production
- Mike Campbell – production
- Ryan Ulyate – production
- Chris Bellman – mastering
- Jeri Heiden – art direction and design
- John Heiden – art direction and design
- Martyn Atkins – photography
