= Martin Lawrence Galleries =

Martin Lawrence Galleries was founded in 1975 and operates nine fine art galleries in the United States specializing in original paintings, sculpture and limited-edition graphics.

Martin Lawrence's collection includes works of art by Andy Warhol, Pablo Picasso, Marc Chagall, Sam Francis, Takashi Murakami, Mark Kostabi, and Keith Haring. Martin Lawrence Galleries is the publisher and representative for Erté, Robert Deyber, Liudmila Kondakova, Felix Mas, Douglas Hofmann, Philippe Bertho, Kerry Hallam, and René Lalonde.

The galleries have loaned work to museums, including works by Picasso, Chagall, Magritte, Calder, Warhol, Francis and other artists.
