= You Got Lucky =

Single by Tom Petty and the Heartbreakers

from the album Long After Dark
- B-side: "Between Two Worlds"
- Released: October 22, 1982
- Recorded: 1982
- Genre: New wave; pop rock
- Length: 3:38
- Label: Backstreet
- Songwriters: Tom Petty; Mike Campbell
- Producers: Tom Petty; Jimmy Iovine

Tom Petty and the Heartbreakers singles chronology
"Stop Draggin' My Heart Around" (1981)	"You Got Lucky" (1982)	"Change of Heart" (1983)

Music video
- "You Got Lucky" on YouTube

"You Got Lucky" is the first single from Tom Petty and the Heartbreakers' album Long After Dark. The song peaked at #20 on the Billboard Hot 100 and #1 on the Billboard Top Tracks chart, where it stayed for three weeks at the end of 1982. Unusually for a Petty song, synthesizers carry the song's main structure.

== Composition ==
In a November 2003 interview with Songfacts, guitarist Mike Campbell explained the song's origins:

"You Got Lucky" was written to a drum loop. I had made a drum loop in my studio and put the music together. We went into the studio and actually recreated another drum loop. The drummer would actually go out and play, then we'd cut the tape and tape the loop together. We ran it around the room over some mic stands and through the tape heads, and then printed that for three or four minutes and then recorded the song over that drum loop. The guitar solo was Tom's idea, he suggested we do an Ennio Morricone guitar sound, kind of a vibrato arm strat kind of solo. Sort of a surf guitar with a tremolo arm, like a Clint Eastwood movie, a Good, The Bad And The Ugly kind of thing. It was Tom's idea to put that approach on there.

Despite the song's popularity, it was initially rarely played live by the band, since it was not one of Petty's personal favorites; it became more of a staple since 2014.

== Reception ==
Cash Box wrote that "smoldering synthesizer and guitar melody sets the moody scene" and that there is a "sharp edge" in Petty's voice, making him sound "earnest and convincing." Billboard called it a "midtempo ballad which has the moody intensity of 'A Woman in Love'."

== Music video ==
Petty felt the video was "a real groundbreaker," and stated that he and the band wrote the treatment themselves, borrowing heavily from the post-apocalyptic look of Mad Max 2, released in 1981.

Directed by Jim Lenahan, the video begins with Tom Petty and Mike Campbell happening upon a black tent in front of the Vasquez Rocks after riding in a hovercar (from the television series Logan's Run). They find a radio/cassette player wrapped in bubble wrap and play the tape, which begins the music of "You Got Lucky." The other band members, Howie Epstein, Benmont Tench and Stan Lynch, arrive in a sidecar racing motorcycle.

Entering the tent, they turn on a bank of cobweb-covered switches that control power for music studio equipment as well as a bank of television sets which show the videos for Tom Petty & The Heartbreakers' "Here Comes My Girl" and "A Woman In Love (It's Not Me)." A clip from the Galactica 1980 episode "Galactica Discovers Earth, Part I" playing on one of the televisions elicits a visceral reaction from Petty, possibly explaining the cause of the destruction in the video's universe. As they explore the tent, Campbell finds a Gretsch 6120 guitar just in time to play the song's guitar solo. Epstein hits the jackpot on a slot machine, causing coins to flow over his hands. Petty overturns an Astro Invader arcade video game before they all ride away, leaving behind the cassette player.

== Personnel ==
- Tom Petty – lead vocals
- Mike Campbell – rhythm and lead guitars
- Benmont Tench – acoustic piano, synthesizers/Oberheim OB-Xa patch "Synth Brass/Jump Synth Brass" with the vibrato effect/Roland Juno-60 patch “Vibrabell”
- Stan Lynch – drums/LinnDrum
- Howie Epstein – bass guitar, backing vocals
- Phil Jones – percussion

== Chart performance ==
Chart (1982–1983)	Peak position
U.S. Billboard Hot 100	20
U.S. Billboard Top Tracks	1
Canadian RPM Top Singles	30

Year-end chart (1983)	Rank
US Top Pop Singles (Billboard)	97
