= Long After Dark =

Studio album by Tom Petty and the Heartbreakers
- Released: November 2, 1982
- Recorded: 1981–82
- Studios: Record Plant (Hollywood); Wally Heider's (Hollywood); Crystal (Hollywood); Rumbo (Los Angeles)
- Genres: Heartland rock; pop rock; new wave
- Length: 37:44
- Label: Backstreet
- Producers: Jimmy Iovine; Tom Petty

Tom Petty and the Heartbreakers chronology
Hard Promises (1981)	Long After Dark (1982)	Southern Accents (1985)

Singles from Long After Dark
- 1. "You Got Lucky" / "Between Two Worlds" Released: October 22, 1982; 2. "Straight into Darkness" / "A Wasted Life" Released: 1982 (Europe only); 3. "Change of Heart" Released: February 1983

Professional ratings
Review scores
Source	Rating
AllMusic	3/5 stars
Blender	1/5 stars
Chicago Tribune	2.5/4 stars
Christgau's Record Guide	C+
The Encyclopedia of Popular Music	3/5 stars
The Essential Rock Discography	5/10
Rolling Stone	4/5 stars
The Rolling Stone Album Guide	3/5 stars

Long After Dark is the fifth studio album by American rock band Tom Petty and the Heartbreakers, released on November 2, 1982, on Backstreet Records. Notable for the MTV hit "You Got Lucky", the album was also the band's first to feature Howie Epstein on bass and harmony vocals. Epstein's vocals are prevalent throughout the album and from that point on, became an integral part of the Heartbreakers' sound.

Two other singles from the album were released, "Change of Heart" and "Straight into Darkness", the former joining "You Got Lucky" in the Billboard top 40. In July 2018, "Keep a Little Soul", an outtake from Long After Dark, was released as the first single to promote Petty's box set An American Treasure. "Keeping Me Alive", another outtake from the album sessions, was a Petty favorite, and was eventually released on his and the Heartbreakers' 1995 box set Playback, as well as on An American Treasure.

On August 30, 2024, the Tom Petty estate announced the release of an expanded deluxe edition of the album, which included 12 new live and previously unreleased songs, as well as a Blu-Ray Dolby Atmos remix. This version was released on streaming services, numbered vinyl and CD on October 18, 2024.

== Track listing ==
All tracks are written by Tom Petty, except where noted.

Side one
No.	Title	Writer(s)	Length
1.	"A One Story Town"		3:06
2.	"You Got Lucky"	Tom Petty; Mike Campbell	3:37
3.	"Deliver Me"		3:28
4.	"Change of Heart"		3:18
5.	"Finding Out"	Petty; Campbell	3:36

Side two
No.	Title	Writer(s)	Length
6.	"We Stand a Chance"		3:38
7.	"Straight into Darkness"		3:49
8.	"The Same Old You"	Petty; Campbell	3:31
9.	"Between Two Worlds"	Petty; Campbell	5:12
10.	"A Wasted Life"		4:35
Total length:			37:44

=== 2024 Deluxe Edition ===
Disc one is the original album.

Disc two
No.	Title	Length
1.	"Stories We Could Tell" (French TV)	3:36
2.	"Never Be You"	3:55
3.	"Turning Point" (Original Drums Version)	3:01
4.	"Don't Make Me Walk The Line"	3:17
5.	"Finding Out" (French TV)	4:03
6.	"Heartbreakers Beach Party" (Extended Version)	2:50
7.	"Keeping Me Alive" (French TV)	3:21
8.	"Straight Into Darkness" (French TV)	4.25
9.	"Ways To Be Wicked" (Denver Sessions)	4:25
10.	"Between Two Worlds" (French TV)	3:50
11.	"One on One"	3:41
12.	"Wild Thing"	3:53
Total length:		43:09

== Personnel ==
Tom Petty & the Heartbreakers

- Tom Petty – lead vocals, guitars (acoustic, electric, 12-string, lead on "We Stand a Chance")
- Mike Campbell – guitars (lead, 12-string), organ on "We Stand a Chance"
- Howie Epstein – bass guitar, backing vocals
- Benmont Tench – acoustic and electric pianos, Hammond and Vox organs, Oberheim OB-Xa synthesizer, backing vocals
- Stan Lynch – drums, backing vocals

Additional musicians

- Ron Blair – bass guitar on "Between Two Worlds"
- Phil Jones – percussion

Production

- Jimmy Iovine – production
- Stephen Marcussen – mastering
- Tom Petty – production
- Don Smith – engineer
- Tommy Steele – design
- Shelly Yakus – engineer

== Charts ==
Weekly chart performance for Long After Dark
Chart	Position
Australian Albums Chart	77
Canadian RPM Albums Chart	17
New Zealand Albums Chart	25
Swedish Albums Chart	20
UK Albums Chart	45
United States Billboard 200	9

2024 chart performance for Long After Dark
Chart (2024)	Peak position
German Albums (Offizielle Top 100)	50
Swiss Albums (Schweizer Hitparade)	86

== Certifications ==
Certifications for Long After Dark
Region	Certification	Certified units/sales
Canada (Music Canada)	Gold	50,000^{^}
United States (RIAA)	Gold	500,000^{^}
^{^} Shipments figures based on certification alone.
