= Shady Grove (song) =

American folk song

Song
- Genre: Appalachian folk

"Shady Grove" (Roud 4456) is a traditional Appalachian folk song, believed to have originated in eastern Kentucky around the beginning the 20th century. The song was popular among old-time musicians of the Cumberlands before being widely adopted in the bluegrass repertoire. Many variants of "Shady Grove" exist (up to 300 stanzas by the early 21st century).

The lyrics describes "the true love of a young man's life and his hope they will wed," and it is sometimes identified as a courting song.

== Link to "Matty Groves" ==
The Dorian mode melody was first published as "Shady Grove" in the Journal of American Folklore in 1915, but it was traditionally used in Appalachia for the ballad "Matty Groves", as sung by traditional singers including Sheila Kay Adams ("Lady Margaret") and Dillard Chandler ("Mathie Groves"). This suggests that the melody may originate in England or Scotland. There is also speculation that the name Shady Grove may be a place-name, a woman's name or nickname, or possibly a mondegreen.

== Popular versions ==
Doc Watson helped popularize "Shady Grove", after presumably learning it from Jean Ritchie, who in turn learned the song from her father.

Fairport Convention released a popular version of Matty Groves in 1969 using the traditional "Shady Grove" tune on their album Liege and Lief. The tune was also used by folk duo John Roberts and Tony Barrand for "The False Lady", a variant of "Young Hunting".

"Shady Grove" has been recorded by numerous artists, including Jean Ritchie, the Kingston Trio, Jerry Garcia and David Grisman, Mudcrutch, Bill Monroe, Billy Strings, Molly Tuttle, Suzy Bogguss, Crooked Still, Taj Mahal, Doc Watson and Clarence Ashley, Ricky Skaggs, Blood Oranges, Quicksilver Messenger Service, The Chieftains, Uncle Sinner, Patty Loveless, Jayke Orvis, and Camper Van Beethoven. It also was performed by The Dillards on an episode of The Andy Griffith Show - "Divorce Mountain Style." The melody appears on the soundtrack of the 1994 game Sid Meier's Colonization.

== Score ==
One score is as follows:
