= The Last DJ =

Studio album by Tom Petty and the Heartbreakers
- Released: October 8, 2002
- Recorded: 2001–2002
- Studios: Cello, Hollywood, California
- Genre: Heartland rock
- Length: 47:36
- Label: Warner Bros.
- Producers: Tom Petty; Mike Campbell; George Drakoulias

Tom Petty and the Heartbreakers chronology
Anthology: Through the Years (2000)	The Last DJ (2002)	The Live Anthology (2009)

Tom Petty chronology
Anthology: Through the Years (2000)	Highway Companion (2006)

Singles from The Last DJ
- 1. "The Last DJ" Released: September 23, 2002; 2. "Have Love Will Travel" Released: 2002; 3. "You and Me" Released: 2002

The Last DJ is the eleventh studio album by American rock band Tom Petty and the Heartbreakers. The title track, "Money Becomes King", "Joe" and "Can't Stop the Sun" are all critical of greed in the music industry, which led to a song boycott by some radio stations.

A "limited edition" digipack version of the album was also released, including a DVD of music videos and other footage shot during the album's production.

The album reached number 9 on the Billboard 200, aided by the single "The Last DJ", which peaked at number 22 on Billboard's Mainstream Rock Tracks chart in 2002. As of 2010, The Last DJ had sold 353,000 copies in the United States, according to Nielsen SoundScan.

The album marks the return of original Heartbreaker Ron Blair on bass guitar, replacing his own replacement, the ailing Howie Epstein. His return was late in the recording process, however, and Petty and Campbell contribute most of the bass work themselves. It is also the first album to credit longtime touring members Scott Thurston and Steve Ferrone as official members.

The title track (which was the first single) and "Dreamville" were included on the compilation The Best of Everything.

== Reception ==
According to review aggregator Metacritic, The Last DJ received "generally favorable reviews", with a 61 out of 100 score based on 14 critic reviews.

In a positive review, Marc Weingarten of Entertainment Weekly called the album's tracks "about as entertaining as polemical pop music can be." In a more mixed review, Greg Kot of Rolling Stone described Petty's lyrics as petulant and the album as "a loosely constructed concept piece about how much the music industry sucks."

Professional ratings
Aggregate scores
Source	Rating
Metacritic	61/100
Review scores
Source	Rating
AllMusic	1.5/5 stars
Entertainment Weekly	A−
Kludge	9/10
Los Angeles Times	3/4 stars
Mojo	3.5/5 stars
Q	2/5 stars
Rolling Stone	3/5 stars
Stylus	D−
Uncut	6/10
The Village Voice	C+

== Track listing ==
All songs written by Tom Petty except 8 and 12, co-written by Mike Campbell

No.	Title	Length
1.	"The Last DJ"	3:48
2.	"Money Becomes King"	5:10
3.	"Dreamville"	3:46
4.	"Joe"	3:15
5.	"When a Kid Goes Bad"	4:56
6.	"Like a Diamond"	4:32
7.	"Lost Children"	4:28
8.	"Blue Sunday"	2:56
9.	"You and Me"	2:58
10.	"The Man Who Loves Women"	2:53
11.	"Have Love Will Travel"	4:05
12.	"Can't Stop the Sun"	4:59

== Personnel ==
Tom Petty and the Heartbreakers

- Tom Petty – guitars, vocals, piano, ukulele, bass guitar on "The Last DJ", "Money Becomes King", "Joe", "Like a Diamond", "Blue Sunday", "You and Me" and "Have Love Will Travel"
- Mike Campbell – guitars, bass guitar on "Dreamville", "When a Kid Goes Bad", and "The Man Who Loves Women"
- Benmont Tench – piano, organ, various keyboards
- Scott Thurston – guitar, lap steel guitar, ukulele, background vocals
- Ron Blair – bass guitar on "Lost Children" and "Can't Stop the Sun"
- Steve Ferrone – drums

Additional musicians

- Jon Brion – orchestration, conductor
- Lindsey Buckingham – background vocals on "The Man Who Loves Women"
- Lenny Castro – percussion

Production

- Mike Campbell – producer
- Richard Dodd – recording engineer
- George Drakoulias – producer
- Ryan Hewitt – assistant engineer
- Steve McGrath – demo engineer
- Tom Petty – producer
- Jim Scott – recording engineer
- Ed Thacker – additional engineer

== Charts ==
Chart performance for The Last DJ
Chart (2002)	Peak position
Austrian Albums (Ö3 Austria)	54
Canada Albums (Nielsen Soundscan)	25
German Albums (Offizielle Top 100)	15
Swedish Albums (Sverigetopplistan)	21
Swiss Albums (Schweizer Hitparade)	44
US Billboard 200	9
