= 2 (Mudcrutch album) =

Album by Mudcrutch

Mudcrutch 2

Studio album by Mudcrutch
- Released: May 20, 2016
- Recorded: 2015
- Genre: Southern rock; country rock
- Length: 43:10
- Label: Reprise
- Producer: Tom Petty; Mike Campbell; Ryan Ulyate

Mudcrutch chronology
Extended Play Live (2008)	Mudcrutch 2 (2016)

Tom Petty chronology
Hypnotic Eye (2014)	Mudcrutch 2 (2016)	An American Treasure (2018)

Mudcrutch 2 (or simply 2) is the second and final studio album by American rock band Mudcrutch, released on May 20, 2016 and was the last recorded studio material by Tom Petty before his death in 2017. The album entered the U.S. Billboard 200 chart at No. 10, selling about 33,000 copies in its first week.

== Promotion ==
A limited edition 7" vinyl single of "Trailer" backed with "Beautiful World" was released for Record Store Day 2016. The band embarked on its first American tour following the release of the album in May and June 2016.

== Accolades ==
Publication	Accolade	Year	Rank
Rolling Stone	50 Best Albums of 2016	2016	29

== Track listing ==
All lead vocals by Tom Petty, except where noted.

All tracks are written by Tom Petty, except where noted.

No.	Title	Writer(s)	Lead vocals	Length
1.	"Trailer"			3:17
2.	"Dreams of Flying"			4:00
3.	"Beautiful Blue"			6:37
4.	"Beautiful World"	Randall Marsh	Marsh	3:08
5.	"I Forgive It All"			4:14
6.	"The Other Side of the Mountain"	Tom Leadon	Leadon with Petty	3:17
7.	"Hope"			3:10
8.	"Welcome to Hell"	Benmont Tench	Tench	3:30
9.	"Save Your Water"			3:13
10.	"Victim of Circumstance"	Mike Campbell	Campbell	2:37
11.	"Hungry No More"			6:14

== The song "Trailer" ==
"Trailer" was originally recorded by Tom Petty and the Heartbreakers and released in 1985 as the B-side of the single "Don't Come Around Here No More" and again in 1995 on the Petty box set Playback. It was re-recorded with an added third verse for this album and released as the lead single.

== Personnel ==
Mudcrutch

- Tom Petty – bass guitar, vocals, harmonica on "Trailer"
- Benmont Tench – organ, piano, Mellotron, vocals
- Tom Leadon – guitar, vocals, lead guitar on "Victim of Circumstance"
- Mike Campbell – guitar, lead vocal on "Victim of Circumstance"
- Randall Marsh – drums, lead vocal on "Beautiful World"

Additional musicians

- Sebastian Harris – shaker on "Victim of Circumstance"
- Josh Jove – pedal steel guitar on "Beautiful Blue"
- Herb Pedersen – banjo on "The Other Side of the Mountain", harmony vocal on "The Other Side of the Mountain", "Hungry No More"

Production

- Mike Campbell – producer
- Greg Looper – engineer
- Tom Petty – producer
- Ryan Ulyate – producer, recording, mixing

== Charts ==
=== Weekly charts ===
Chart (2016)	Peak position
Belgian Albums (Ultratop Flanders)	155
German Albums (Offizielle Top 100)	40
Irish Albums (IRMA)	91
New Zealand Albums (RMNZ)	39
Spanish Albums (Promusicae)	70
Swiss Albums (Schweizer Hitparade)	62
UK Albums (OCC)	62
US Billboard 200	10
US Folk Albums (Billboard)	2
US Top Rock Albums (Billboard)	3

=== Year-end charts ===
Chart (2016)	Position
US Top Rock Albums (Billboard)	58
