= Mudcrutch =

American rock band

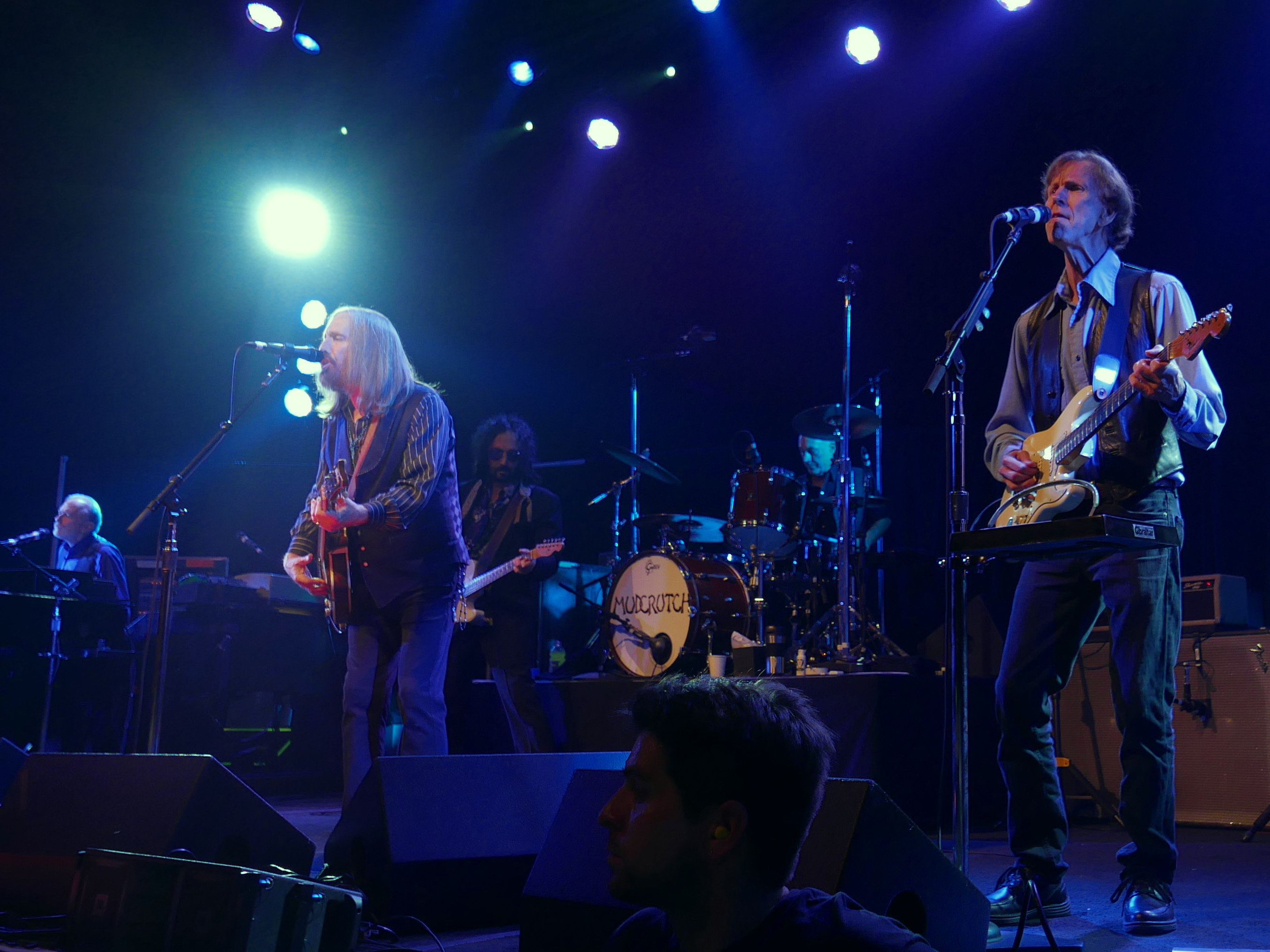
- Mudcrutch in 2016; from left to right: Benmont Tench, Tom Petty, Mike Campbell, Randall Marsh and Tom Leadon

Background information
- Origin: Gainesville, Florida, U.S.
- Genres: Southern rock; country rock
- Years active: 1970–1975, 2007–2017
- Labels: Shelter, Reprise
- Spinoffs: Tom Petty and the Heartbreakers
- Past members: Tom Petty; Tom Leadon; Jim Lenahan; Charlie Souza; Mike Campbell; Benmont Tench; Randall Marsh; Danny Roberts

Mudcrutch was an American rock band from Gainesville, Florida, whose sound touched on southern rock and country rock. They were first active in the 1970s and reformed in 2007, and are best known for being the band which launched Tom Petty to fame.

Mudcrutch formed in Gainesville in 1970 and soon became a popular act across Florida. The band moved to Los Angeles in 1974 to attract the attention of a record company. Though they signed a contract with Shelter Records, they released only one poor-selling single before breaking up in 1975. The following year, former Mudcrutch members Petty, Mike Campbell, and Benmont Tench formed the core of a new band, Tom Petty and the Heartbreakers.

Most of the original Mudcrutch lineup reformed in 2007 to record their first album as a group, which was followed by a tour. A second album followed in 2016. Petty's death in 2017 effectively dissolved the group; guitarist Tom Leadon died in 2023.

== History ==
=== 1970–1975 ===
Mudcrutch was formed in 1970 by Gainesville, Florida, residents Tom Petty and Tom Leadon (brother of Bernie Leadon from the Eagles), then teenagers, who had been playing together in a group called the Epics. Mudcrutch's lineup consisted of Petty (bass and vocals), Leadon (guitar and vocals), Jim Lenahan (vocals), Randall Marsh (drums) and Mike Campbell (guitar). Lenahan was initially the band's lead vocalist, but Petty very quickly also started singing lead on some songs.

This incarnation of Mudcrutch issued a locally distributed single ("Up In Mississippi"/"Cause Is Understood") in 1971, with Petty writing and singing both songs. Leadon and Lenehan left the band in 1972 and were replaced by bassist/guitarist/vocalist Danny Roberts and keyboardist Benmont Tench. Ricky Rucker was a part of the band for a short time. Mudcrutch became locally popular and regularly played gigs from central Florida to southern Georgia. In Gainesville, they had a long stint as the house band at Dub's Lounge and organized several well-attended music festivals at "Mudcrutch Farm", a run-down house on a large lot where several band members lived.

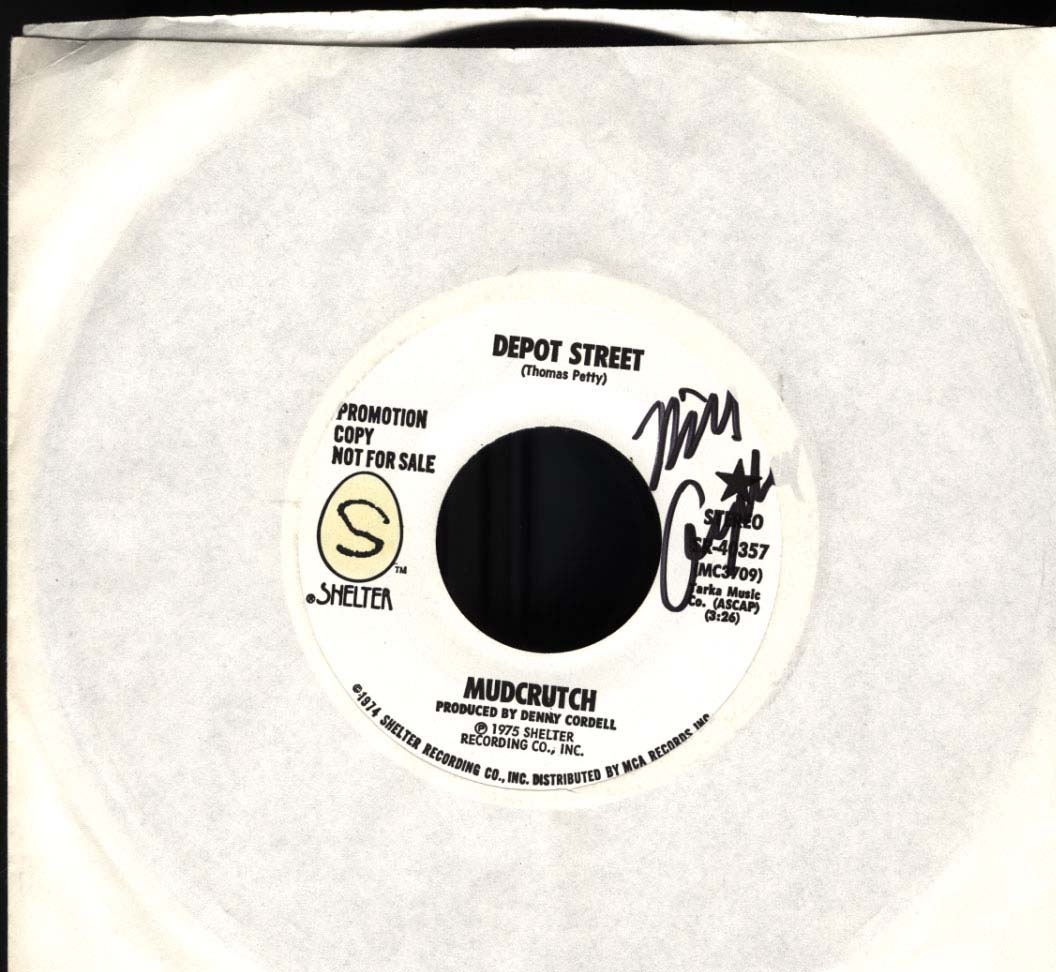
"Depot Street" vinyl, signed by Mike Campbell

In 1974, the members of Mudcrutch decided to relocate to Los Angeles to try to sign with a major record label. After several rejections, they signed with Leon Russell's independent Shelter Records. The band released one single, "Depot Street" in 1975, which failed to chart. After Danny Roberts left the group, Petty invited Charlie Souza to take over on bass guitar and the band continued recording in Leon Russell's Tulsa studio, and later at his Encino, California, home. Discouraged by the group's lack of success, the record company broke up Mudcrutch in late 1975, keeping only Petty under contract. Several months later, Petty regrouped with former Mudcrutch members Mike Campbell and Benmont Tench to form the Heartbreakers along with fellow Gainesville natives Stan Lynch (drums) and Ron Blair (bass).

=== Reformation: 2007–2017 ===
In August 2007, Tom Petty invited Randall Marsh and Tom Leadon, original members of Mudcrutch, to reunite with Heartbreakers Benmont Tench and Mike Campbell to reform Mudcrutch. They recorded an album, Mudcrutch, which was released on April 29, 2008, by Reprise Records, and contains 14 old and new tracks. "We would play and then we would just talk about the old days," said Leadon. The band toured briefly in California to promote the album throughout April and the beginning of May 2008. The album hit number 8 on the Billboard 200 albums chart.

Fans who bought tickets to the tour through Ticketmaster were given six free downloads from the album.

On November 11, 2008, a live EP titled Extended Play Live was released. All tracks were recorded live in April 2008. On the same day American music channel VH1 Classic broadcast a documentary about the band.

According to Rolling Stone, Mudcrutch intended to reconvene August 2015 to begin work on a new album. The group was originally going to begin work on the album in January of that year, but things were pushed back eight months due to medical issues that guitarist Tom Leadon was experiencing. In February 2016, prior to the announcement that they were releasing a second album, Mudcrutch was announced as a headliner for both the 2016 Bunbury Music Festival in Cincinnati, Ohio, and the 2016 Summer Camp Music Festival in Chillicothe, Illinois.

The band's second full-length album, 2, was released May 20, 2016, on Reprise Records. Preceding the album's release was a single, "Trailer", as well as "Beautiful World" and "Hungry No More". The album hit number 10 on the Billboard 200 albums chart. Less than three days after the album was released, the band embarked on their first national tour in support of the album. The tour began the same way their 2008 tour did: with two benefit shows for the Midnight Mission (on May 23 and 24, 2016, in Los Angeles). Herb Pedersen, who is also credited on 2, joined Mudcrutch on the tour.

Petty died on October 2, 2017, of cardiac arrest, while Leadon died on March 22, 2023, of natural causes. Both deaths effectively ended the possibility of any further Mudcrutch activity. Benmont Tench has toured as a solo artist.

== Personnel ==
=== Band members ===
- Tom Petty – bass (1971–1974, 2007–2017; his death), backing vocals (1971–1973, 2007–2017), lead vocals, harmonica (1971–1975, 2007–2017), rhythm guitar (1973–1975), keyboards (1971–1973)
- Mike Campbell – lead and rhythm guitar (1971–1975, 2007–2017), mandolin, occasional lead vocals (2015–2017)
- Tom Leadon – lead and rhythm guitar, backing vocals (1971–1972, 2007–2017; died 2023), occasional lead vocals (2007–2017)
- Jim Lenahan – lead vocals (1971–1972)
- Benmont Tench – keyboards, backing vocals (1973–1975, 2007–2017), occasional lead vocals (2007–2017)
- Randall Marsh – drums (1971–1975, 2007–2017), occasional lead vocals (2015–2017)
- Danny Roberts – bass, rhythm guitar, backing and lead vocals (1973–1974)
- Charlie Souza – bass (1974–1975)

== Discography ==
=== Studio albums ===
Title	Details	Peak chart positions						
Title	Details	US	BEL (FL)	GER	IRE	NZ	SWI	UK
Mudcrutch	Released: April 29, 2008; Label: Reprise; Format: LP, CD, streaming	8	—	—	—	—	—	—
2	Released: May 20, 2016; Label: Reprise; Format: LP, CD, streaming	10	155	40	91	39	62	62

=== Live albums ===
- 2008: Extended Play Live
- 2017: The Very Best Performances from the 2016 Mudcrutch Tour

=== Singles ===
- 1971: "Up in Mississippi Tonight" b/w "Cause Is Understood" (Pepper 9449)
- 1975: "Depot Street" b/w "Wild Eyes" (Shelter SR-40357)
- 2008: "Scare Easy" (March 25, 2008)
- 2016: "Trailer" (March 25, 2016)
- 2016: "Hungry No More"
- 2016: "I Forgive It All"
- 2017: "How Much Do You Need" (SiriusXM Exclusive)

=== Music videos ===
- 2008: "Scare Easy"
- 2008: "Lover of the Bayou"
- 2016: "I Forgive It All"
- 2019: "Crystal River"

=== Also appears on ===
- 1995: Playback (box set compilation by Tom Petty and the Heartbreakers)
- 2018: An American Treasure (box set compilation by Tom Petty and the Heartbreakers)
- 2019: The Best of Everything (compilation album by Tom Petty and the Heartbreakers)
- 2026: Origins 1971-1978 (box set compilation by Tom Petty and the Heartbreakers)
