= Square One (song) =

2005 song by Tom Petty

Song by Tom Petty

from the album Highway Companion
- Released: July 25, 2006
- Recorded: 2005
- Studio: Bungalow Palace and Shoreline Recorders, Los Angeles, California
- Genre: Folk rock
- Length: 3:25
- Label: Warner Bros.; American
- Songwriter(s): Tom Petty
- Producer(s): Jeff Lynne; Tom Petty; Mike Campbell

"Square One" is a song by American musician Tom Petty and is the second track on his 2006 album, Highway Companion. The song was released in September 2005 as part of the soundtrack for the film Elizabethtown. In December 2005, it was nominated for Grammy Award for Best Song Written for a Motion Picture, Television or Other Visual Media in the Grammy Awards of 2006.
