= Tom Leadon =

American musician (1952–2023)

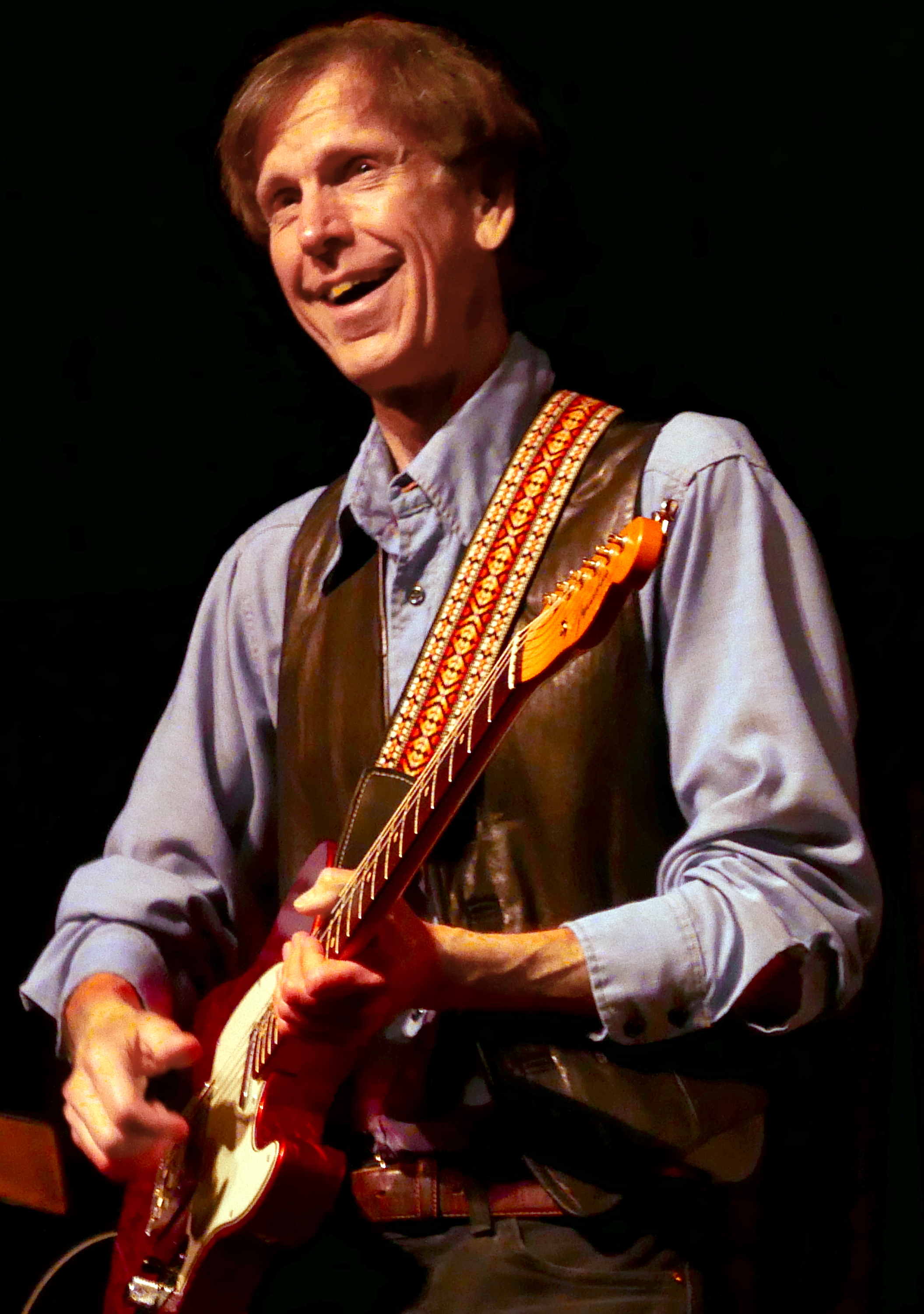
- Leadon in 2016, performing with Mudcrutch

Background information
- Born: Thomas Joseph Leadon; September 16, 1952; Rosemount, Minnesota, U.S.
- Origin: United States
- Died: March 22, 2023 (aged 70)
- Genre: Rock
- Occupation: Guitarist
- Instrument: Guitar
- Formerly of: Mudcrutch

Thomas Joseph Leadon (/ˈlɛdən/ LED-ən; September 16, 1952 – March 22, 2023) was an American musician. He was one of the founding members of Tom Petty's original band, Mudcrutch, and remained its guitarist following its revival in 2007. He was the brother of Bernie Leadon, the former banjoist and guitarist of the Eagles.

== Biography ==
In high school, Leadon was a member of the Epics in Gainesville, Florida, where he met Petty. Leadon was the lead guitarist and Petty played bass. Soon after forming Mudcrutch, with Randall Marsh on drums, the group added a second lead guitarist, Mike Campbell. Leadon and Campbell shared lead guitar solos during Mudcrutch's live shows in and around Gainesville, and also on their recording of "Up in Mississippi".

Leadon left Mudcrutch in 1972 and moved to Los Angeles, following in the footsteps of his older brother Bernie, who had recently formed the Eagles with Randy Meisner, Glenn Frey, and Don Henley. Leadon also played bass in Linda Ronstadt's band, and in 1976 joined the country-rock band Silver, which had a top 40 hit the same year with "Wham-Bam".

In 1975, the Eagles recorded one of Leadon's original songs, "Hollywood Waltz", and released it on their One of These Nights LP. The final version of the song is credited to Tom Leadon, Bernie Leadon, Frey, and Henley. Later that year Buck Owens released his own version.

Leadon later became a guitar teacher in Nashville.

In 2007, Petty reformed Mudcrutch, which had broken up in 1975. The band recorded a self-titled debut album in 2008. Recording personnel included original band members: Petty, Leadon, Mike Campbell, and Randall Marsh. Also in this version of Mudcrutch was Benmont Tench, who had been originally brought into the band when Leadon left in 1972. The band went on to continue being intermittently active with touring, and recording a live album and a follow-up to their debut with Mudcrutch 2, in 2016. Petty died in 2017, bringing Mudcrutch's operations to a close.

In a biography, Conversations with Tom Petty, Petty credits Leadon with inspiring him to move to L.A. to try to make it as a musician.

Leadon died on March 22, 2023, at the age of 70.
