= Hypnotic Eye =

Studio album by Tom Petty and the Heartbreakers
- Released: July 28, 2014
- Recorded: August 9, 2011 – January 24, 2014
- Genres: Heartland rock; blues rock
- Length: 44:36
- Label: Reprise
- Producers: Tom Petty; Mike Campbell; Ryan Ulyate

Tom Petty and the Heartbreakers chronology
Kiss My Amps (Live) (2011)	Hypnotic Eye (2014)	An American Treasure (2018)

Tom Petty chronology
Kiss My Amps (Live) (2011)	Hypnotic Eye (2014)	Mudcrutch 2 (2016)

Singles from Hypnotic Eye
- 1. "American Dream Plan B" Released: June 10, 2014; 2. "Red River" Released: June 10, 2014; 3. "U Get Me High" Released: June 10, 2014; 4. "Forgotten Man" Released: June 24, 2014; 5. "Fault Lines" Released: July 15, 2014

Hypnotic Eye is the thirteenth and final studio album by American rock band Tom Petty and the Heartbreakers, released in the UK on July 28, 2014, and in the United States on July 29, by Reprise Records. The album debuted at No. 1 on the Billboard 200, becoming the only Tom Petty and the Heartbreakers album ever to top the chart. Hypnotic Eye was nominated for the 2015 Grammy Award for Best Rock Album. It was the Heartbreakers' final studio album before disbanding in 2017, following Petty's death in October of that year.

== Background ==
The first sessions for the album occurred in August 2011 at the band's Los Angeles-based rehearsal space, the "Clubhouse", where the song "Burnt-Out Town" was recorded. The album marks a stylistic return to the band's first two albums, Tom Petty and the Heartbreakers (1976) and You're Gonna Get It! (1978).

== Promotion ==
On June 10, 2014, the song "American Dream Plan B" was released as the lead single from the album, along with two additional tracks, "Red River" and "U Get Me High", from the band's website and digital stores. A month later, a CD single with "American Dream Plan B" and "U Get Me High" and a coupon for $2 off the price of the album were released.

"Forgotten Man" and "Fault Lines" were released for streaming on the band's website in early July 2014. Additionally, all five tracks released in promotion of Hypnotic Eye were released on an "interactive radio" with a tuning dial that finds the tracks for listeners.

== Commercial performance ==
The album debuted at No. 1 on the Billboard 200 chart, with first-week sales of 131,000 copies in the United States; to date, it is the only Tom Petty (solo or with the Heartbreakers) album to reach the top spot on the chart.

== Reception ==
Hypnotic Eye was met with "generally favorable" reviews from critics. At Metacritic, which assigns a weighted average rating out of 100 to reviews from mainstream publications, this release received an average score of 77, based on 31 reviews.

Professional ratings
Aggregate scores
Source	Rating
Metacritic	77/100
Review scores
Source	Rating
AllMusic	4/5 stars
Billboard	4.5/5 stars
Chicago Tribune	3/4 stars
Entertainment Weekly	A−
Exclaim!	7/10
The Observer	4/5 stars
PopMatters	8/10
Rolling Stone	4/5 stars
Spin	7/10
Uncut	8/10

== Track listing ==
All tracks are written by Tom Petty, except "Fault Lines" by Petty and Mike Campbell. All songs arranged by Tom Petty and the Heartbreakers.

Hypnotic Eye track listing
No.	Title	Length
1.	"American Dream Plan B"	3:00
2.	"Fault Lines"	4:28
3.	"Red River"	3:59
4.	"Full Grown Boy"	3:26
5.	"All You Can Carry"	4:34
6.	"Power Drunk"	4:39
7.	"Forgotten Man"	2:48
8.	"Sins of My Youth"	3:49
9.	"U Get Me High"	4:11
10.	"Burnt Out Town"	3:05
11.	"Shadow People"	6:37
Total length:		44:36

Vinyl and Blu-ray bonus track
No.	Title	Length
12.	"Playing Dumb"	4:13
Total length:		48:49

== Personnel ==
Tom Petty and the Heartbreakers

- Tom Petty – vocals (all tracks), rhythm guitar (all tracks but 10), lead guitar (right channel on track 9, track 10, track 11 outro), fuzz bass (track 3), high bass (track 7), bass (track 9)
- Mike Campbell – lead guitar (tracks 1–8, left channel on track 9, 11), rhythm guitar (track 10, 12)
- Benmont Tench – piano (tracks 1–7, 10–12), electric piano (track 1, 6, 11), organ (1–3, 5–9, 11–12), Mellotron (tracks 4, 8, 11), synthesizer (track 5)
- Scott Thurston – rhythm guitar (tracks 1, 3, 5–8, 11), 12-string guitar (track 4), harmonica (track 2, 10, 12), tambourine (track 9), lead guitar (track 12)
- Ron Blair – bass guitar (all tracks but 9)
- Steve Ferrone – drums (all tracks), percussion (track 6, 7, 12)

Additional musicians

- Josh Jové – fuzz guitar (track 7)
- Ryan Ulyate – background vocals (track 8)

Production

- Chris Bellman – mastering
- Mike Campbell – producer
- Jeri Heiden – art direction
- Josh Jové – assistant engineer
- Greg Looper – engineer
- Tom Petty – producer
- Chase Simpson – assistant engineer
- Nick Steinhardt – design, art direction
- Ryan Ulyate – producer, mixer, recorder
- Travis Weidel – back-line technician
- Alan "Bugs" Weidel – crew chief, back-line technician, equipment manager

== Charts ==
=== Weekly charts ===
Weekly chart performance for Hypnotic Eye
Chart (2014)	Peak position
Australian Albums (ARIA)	30
Canadian Albums (Billboard)	1
Danish Albums (Hitlisten)	5
German Albums (Offizielle Top 100)	5
Finnish Albums (Suomen virallinen lista)	49
Hungarian Albums (MAHASZ)	36
Irish Albums (IRMA)	13
Italian Albums (FIMI)	68
New Zealand Albums (RMNZ)	10
Norwegian Albums (VG-lista)	6
Scottish Albums (Official Charts)	8
Swedish Albums (Sverigetopplistan)	6
UK Albums (Official Charts)	7
US Billboard 200	1
US Top Rock Albums (Billboard)	1

=== Year-end charts ===
Year-end chart performance for Hypnotic Eye
Chart (2014)	Position
US Billboard 200	70
US Top Rock Albums (Billboard)	13
