= Highway Companion =

Studio album by Tom Petty
- Released: July 25, 2006
- Recorded: 2005–2006
- Studios: Bungalow Palace and Shoreline Recorders, Los Angeles
- Genre: Heartland rock
- Length: 43:56
- Labels: Warner Bros.; American
- Producers: Jeff Lynne; Tom Petty; Mike Campbell

Tom Petty chronology
The Last DJ (2002)	Highway Companion (2006)	Mudcrutch (2008)

Singles from Highway Companion
- 1. "Saving Grace" Released: July 4, 2006; 2. "Flirting with Time" Released: 2006

Highway Companion is the third and final solo studio album by American singer-songwriter Tom Petty. It was released on July 25, 2006, and charted at No. 4 on the Billboard 200 album chart. The album was produced by former Traveling Wilburys bandmate Jeff Lynne, who also produced Petty's highly acclaimed first solo album, Full Moon Fever, as well as the Heartbreakers' next album Into the Great Wide Open. Petty released the album through Rick Rubin's American Recordings label and Warner Bros. Records, where Petty has had a record contract since his second solo album, Wildflowers (which was produced by Rubin). The tracks "Saving Grace" and "Big Weekend" were released July 4, 2006, on the iTunes Music Store. It ended up being Petty's only album for American Recordings, as that label moved to Columbia Records distribution in 2007; Warner Bros retained the rights to Petty, eventually reassigning him to subsidiary label Reprise Records.

A streaming version of the album was available on numerous websites before its release. The iTunes release of the album contained extras: a live version of "Saving Grace", the video for "Saving Grace" and an interactive media booklet. Petty stated in an interview that this would be his last solo album.

== Special edition ==
An expanded special edition of Highway Companion was released on June 5, 2007. This edition included the original album unchanged, but added two new tracks and demos of "This Old Town" and "Big Weekend". The new tracks, "Home" and "Around the Roses", were recorded for the album in 2005 and were mentioned in Tom Petty's 2005 biography Conversations with Tom Petty, but remained unreleased until this edition. The leatherette board packaging also includes two postcards.

== Critical reception ==
Professional ratings
Aggregate scores
Source	Rating
Metacritic	73/100
Review scores
Source	Rating
AllMusic	3.5/5 stars
The A.V. Club	B+
Entertainment Weekly	A−
The Guardian	4/5 stars
Los Angeles Times	3/4 stars
Paste	4/10
PopMatters	7/10 stars
Rolling Stone	3.5/5 stars
Slant Magazine	4/5 stars
Spin	2/5 stars

Highway Companion has a score of 73 out of 100 from Metacritic based on "generally favorable reviews". AllMusic's Stephen Thomas Erlewine did not like that some songs on the album seemed to be made for the road while others were not, but he felt that Jeff Lynne's production on this album was different than Full Moon Fever and Into the Great Wide Open, which appealed to him. Erlewine also felt the album was darker than Petty's previous work but was still a "reliable" record. Noel Murray of The A.V. Club stated it was arguably the fourth best album that Petty has made and that the album's title was appropriate. Dave Simpson, in his review for The Guardian, said the album was a good way to say goodbye from music, although Petty did not go through with his retirement plans. Jam!'s Darryl Sterdan gave it three-and-a-half stars out of five and thinks Petty was taking his music "down a peg" and that the album shows Petty "aging graciously". John Metzger, in his Music Box review of the album, gave it four stars out of five and felt the complaints that Petty sang about came across better on Companion than The Last DJ and that the album was no less powerful than his previous albums. Alan Light of Rolling Stone said that although Highway Companion was not as good as Petty's two previous solo efforts, it successfully combined the previous albums' styles and was worth listening to.

== Track listing ==
All tracks are written by Tom Petty.

Highway Companion track listing
No.	Title	Length
1.	"Saving Grace"	3:48
2.	"Square One"	3:26
3.	"Flirting with Time"	3:16
4.	"Down South"	3:27
5.	"Jack"	2:29
6.	"Turn This Car Around"	3:59
7.	"Big Weekend"	3:16
8.	"Night Driver"	4:28
9.	"Damaged by Love"	3:23
10.	"This Old Town"	4:17
11.	"Ankle Deep"	3:24
12.	"The Golden Rose"	4:43
Total length:		43:56

Special edition bonus tracks
No.	Title	Length
13.	"Home"	3:11
14.	"Around the Roses"	2:58
15.	"Big Weekend" (demo version)	3:04
16.	"This Old Town" (demo version)	4:24
Total length:		57:33

== Personnel ==
- Tom Petty – lead and backing vocals, guitars (rhythm, 12-string, bass guitar on "Square One", lead on "Jack"), drums, harmonica, electric piano on "Night Driver", keyboards on "Jack", producer
- Mike Campbell – guitars (lead, 12-string), vibraphone on "The Golden Rose", producer
- Jeff Lynne – guitars (bass, rhythm), keyboards, backing vocals, autoharp on "Ankle Deep", producer

Additional personnel

- Charlie Bolois – studio tech
- Robert Deyber – cover art
- Brian Gardner – mastering
- Steve McGrath – additional engineer for "Square One" and "Jack"
- Ryan Ulyate – recording and mix engineer
- Alan "Bugs" Weidel – session supervision, equipment and guitar tech, "coffee and tea transportation for Tom Petty"

== Charts ==
=== Weekly charts ===
Weekly chart performance for Highway Companion
Chart (2006)	Peak position
Austrian Albums (Ö3 Austria)	60
Belgian Albums (Ultratop Flanders)	72
Belgian Albums (Ultratop Wallonia)	58
Canadian Albums (Billboard)	5
Dutch Albums (Album Top 100)	55
Finnish Albums (Suomen virallinen lista)	22
French Albums (SNEP)	155
German Albums (Offizielle Top 100)	12
Irish Albums (IRMA)	70
Italian Albums (FIMI)	51
New Zealand Albums (RMNZ)	13
Norwegian Albums (VG-lista)	15
Scottish Albums (Official Charts)	49
Swedish Albums (Sverigetopplistan)	3
Swiss Albums (Schweizer Hitparade)	44
UK Albums (Official Charts)	56
US Billboard 200	4
US Top Rock Albums (Billboard)	1

=== Year-end charts ===
Year-end chart performance for Highway Companion
Chart (2006)	Position
Swedish Albums (Sverigetopplistan)	60
US Billboard 200	178
