= Tom Petty =

American rock musician (1950–2017)

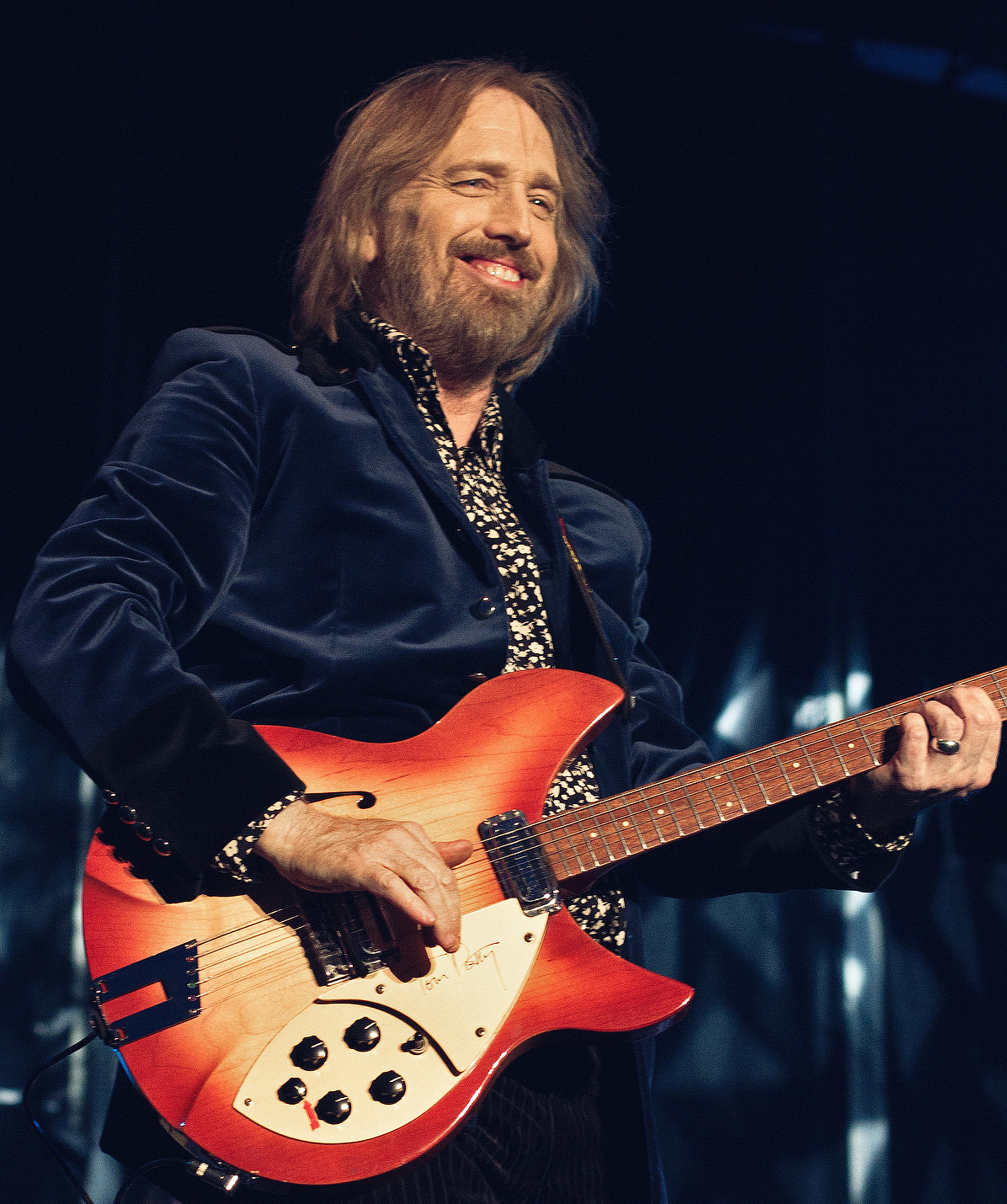
- Petty performing in Denmark in 2012

Background information
- Also known as: Charlie T. Wilbury Jr.; Muddy Wilbury
- Born: Thomas Earl Petty; October 20, 1950; Gainesville, Florida, US
- Died: October 2, 2017 (aged 66) Santa Monica, California, US
- Genres: Rock; heartland rock; roots rock; country rock; Southern rock
- Occupations: Singer; songwriter; musician
- Instruments: Vocals; guitar; harmonica; bass; keyboards
- Works: Tom Petty discography
- Years active: 1967–2017
- Labels: Shelter; Backstreet; MCA; Warner Bros.; American; Reprise
- Formerly of: Mudcrutch; Tom Petty and the Heartbreakers; Traveling Wilburys
- Website: tompetty.com

Thomas Earl Petty (October 20, 1950 – October 2, 2017) was an American singer, songwriter, and guitarist. He was the leader and frontman of the rock bands Tom Petty and the Heartbreakers and Mudcrutch and a member of the late 1980s supergroup the Traveling Wilburys. He was also a successful solo artist.

Over the course of his career, Petty sold more than 80 million records worldwide, making him one of the best-selling artists of all time. His hit singles with the Heartbreakers include "American Girl" (1976), "Don't Do Me Like That" (1979), "Refugee" (1980), "The Waiting" (1981), "Don't Come Around Here No More" (1985) and "Learning to Fly" (1991). Petty's solo hits include "I Won't Back Down" (1989), "Free Fallin'" (1989), and "You Don't Know How It Feels" (1994).

Petty and the Heartbreakers were inducted into the Rock and Roll Hall of Fame in 2002. Petty was honored as MusiCares Person of the Year in February 2017 for his contributions to music and for his philanthropy. He also acted; he had a recurring role as the voice of Lucky Kleinschmidt in the animated comedy series King of the Hill from 2004 to the show's original conclusion in 2009.

Petty died of an accidental prescription drug overdose in October 2017 at the age of 66, one week after the end of the Tom Petty and the Heartbreakers' 40th Anniversary Tour.

== Early life and education ==
Petty was born on October 20, 1950, in Gainesville, Florida, the first of two sons of Kitty Petty (née Avery), a local tax office worker, and Earl Petty, a traveling salesman. His brother, Bruce, was seven years younger.

Petty grew up in the Northeast Gainesville Residential District, known locally as the Duckpond. After his death, a historical marker was placed in the neighborhood and a nearby park was renamed to Tom Petty Park.

Petty attended Howard Bishop Middle School, where he played Little League baseball and basketball. He then attended Gainesville High School, graduating in 1968.

== Career ==
Petty's interest in rock and roll music began at age 10 when he had an opportunity to meet Elvis Presley. In the summer of 1961, his uncle was working on the set of Presley's film Follow That Dream, in nearby Ocala, and invited Petty to watch the movie's filming.

Petty instantly became a Presley fan. When he returned that Saturday, he was greeted by his friend Keith Harben, and soon traded his Wham-O slingshot for a collection of Elvis 45s. Of that meeting with Presley, Petty said, "Elvis glowed."

In 2006, Petty said he knew he wanted to be in a band the moment he saw the Beatles on The Ed Sullivan Show. "The minute I saw the Beatles on the Ed Sullivan Show—and it's true of thousands of guys—there was the way out. There was a way to do it. You get your friends and you're a self-contained unit. And you make the music. And it looked like so much fun. It was something I identified with. I had never been hugely into sports. ... I had been a big fan of Elvis. But I really saw in the Beatles that here's something I could do. I knew I could do it. It wasn't long before there were groups springing up in garages all over the place." He later said that the Rolling Stones inspired him by demonstrating that he and musicians like him could make it in rock and roll.

Don Felder, a fellow Gainesville resident who later joined the Eagles, wrote in his autobiography that he was one of Petty's first guitar teachers although Petty said that Felder taught him to play piano instead.

As a young man, Petty worked briefly on the grounds crew of the University of Florida, but never attended as a student. An Ogeechee lime tree that he purportedly planted while employed at the university is now called the Tom Petty tree, though Petty said he did not recall planting any trees. He also worked briefly as a gravedigger.

=== 1976–1987: Tom Petty and the Heartbreakers ===
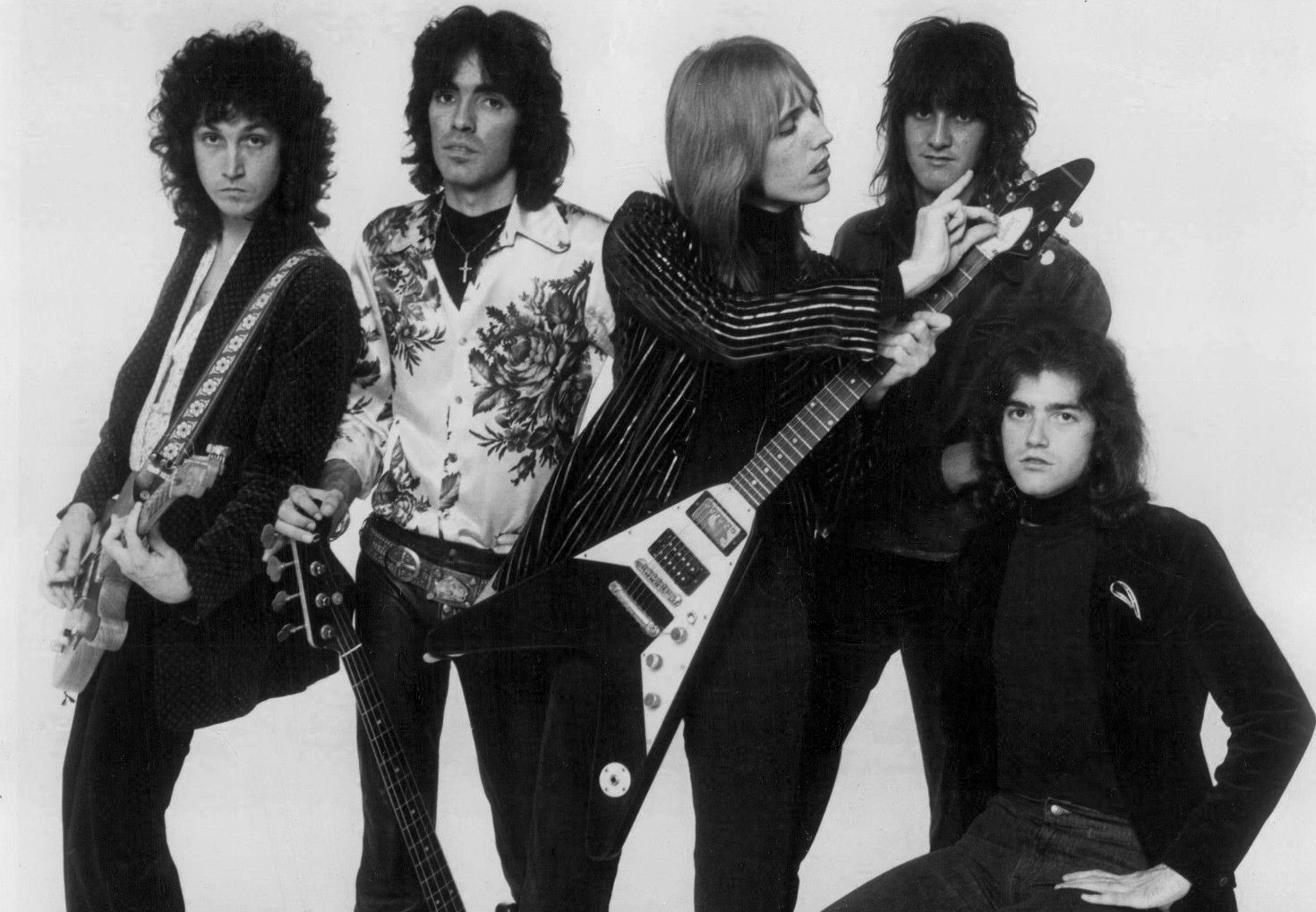
Petty (center) with the Heartbreakers in 1977

Shortly after embracing his musical aspirations, Petty started a band known as the Epics, which later evolved into Mudcrutch. The band included future Heartbreakers Mike Campbell and Benmont Tench and was popular in Gainesville, but their recordings went unnoticed by a mainstream audience. They recorded at The Church Studio in Tulsa, Oklahoma. Their only single, "Depot Street", released in 1975 by Shelter Records, failed to chart.

After Mudcrutch split up, Petty reluctantly agreed to pursue a solo career. Tench decided to form his own group, whose sound Petty appreciated. Eventually, Petty and Campbell collaborated with Tench, Ron Blair and Stan Lynch, forming the first lineup of the Heartbreakers. Their self-titled debut album gained little popularity among American audiences, achieving greater success in Britain. The singles "American Girl" and "Breakdown" (re-released in 1977) peaked at No. 40 after the band toured in the United Kingdom in support of Nils Lofgren. The debut album was released by Shelter Records, which at that time was distributed by ABC Records.

Their second album, You're Gonna Get It!, was the band's first Top 40 album, featuring the singles "I Need to Know" and "Listen to Her Heart". Their third album, Damn the Torpedoes, quickly went platinum, selling nearly two million copies; it includes their breakthrough singles "Don't Do Me Like That", "Here Comes My Girl", "Even the Losers" and "Refugee".

In September 1979, Tom Petty and the Heartbreakers performed at a Musicians United for Safe Energy concert at Madison Square Garden in Manhattan. Their rendition of "Cry to Me" was featured on the resulting album, No Nukes.

Their fourth album, Hard Promises, released in 1981, became a top-ten hit, going platinum and spawning the hit single "The Waiting". The album also featured Petty's first duet, "Insider" with Stevie Nicks.

Bass player Ron Blair quit the group and was replaced on the fifth album, Long After Dark (1982), by Howie Epstein; the resulting lineup lasted until 1994. The album contained the hit "You Got Lucky".

In 1985, the band participated in Live Aid, playing four songs at John F. Kennedy Stadium, in Philadelphia before a crowd of 89,484 people.

The band's album, Southern Accents, was also released in 1985. It included the hit single "Don't Come Around Here No More", produced by Dave Stewart. The song's video featured Petty dressed as the Mad Hatter, mocking and chasing Alice from the book Alice's Adventures in Wonderland, then cutting and eating her as if she were a cake. The ensuing tour led to the live album Pack Up the Plantation: Live! and an invitation from Bob Dylan to join Dylan on his 60-date True Confessions Tour through Asia, Oceania, and North America.

In 1986 and 1987, they played some dates with the Grateful Dead. Also in 1987, the group released Let Me Up (I've Had Enough) which includes "Jammin' Me" which Petty wrote with Dylan.

=== 1988–1991: Traveling Wilburys and solo career ===
In 1988, Petty, along with George Harrison, Bob Dylan, Roy Orbison and Jeff Lynne, was a founding member of the Traveling Wilburys. The band's first song, "Handle with Care", was intended as a B-side of one of Harrison's singles, but was judged too good for that purpose and the group decided to record a full album, Traveling Wilburys Vol. 1. A second Wilburys album, mischievously titled Traveling Wilburys Vol. 3 and recorded without the recently deceased Orbison, followed in 1990. The album was named Vol. 3 as a response to a series of bootlegged studio sessions being sold as Travelling Wilburys Vol. 2. Petty incorporated Traveling Wilburys songs into his live shows, consistently playing "Handle with Care" in shows from 2003 to 2006, and for his 2008 tour adding "surprises" such as "End of the Line" to the set list.

In 1989, Petty released Full Moon Fever, which featured hits "I Won't Back Down", "Free Fallin'" and "Runnin' Down a Dream". It was nominally his first solo album, although several Heartbreakers and other well-known musicians participated: Mike Campbell co-produced the album with Petty and Jeff Lynne of Electric Light Orchestra, and backing musicians included Campbell, Lynne, and fellow Wilburys Roy Orbison and George Harrison (Ringo Starr appears on drums in the video for "I Won't Back Down", but they were actually performed by Phil Jones).

Petty and the Heartbreakers reformed in 1991 and released Into the Great Wide Open, which was co-produced by Lynne and included the hit singles "Learning To Fly" and "Into the Great Wide Open", the latter featuring Johnny Depp and Faye Dunaway in the music video.

Before leaving MCA Records, Petty and the Heartbreakers got together to record, live in the studio, two new songs for a Greatest Hits package: "Mary Jane's Last Dance" and Thunderclap Newman's "Something in the Air". This was Stan Lynch's last recorded performance with the Heartbreakers. Petty commented "He left right after the session without really saying goodbye." The package went on to sell over ten million copies, therefore receiving diamond certification by the RIAA.

=== 1991–2017: Move to Warner Bros. Records ===
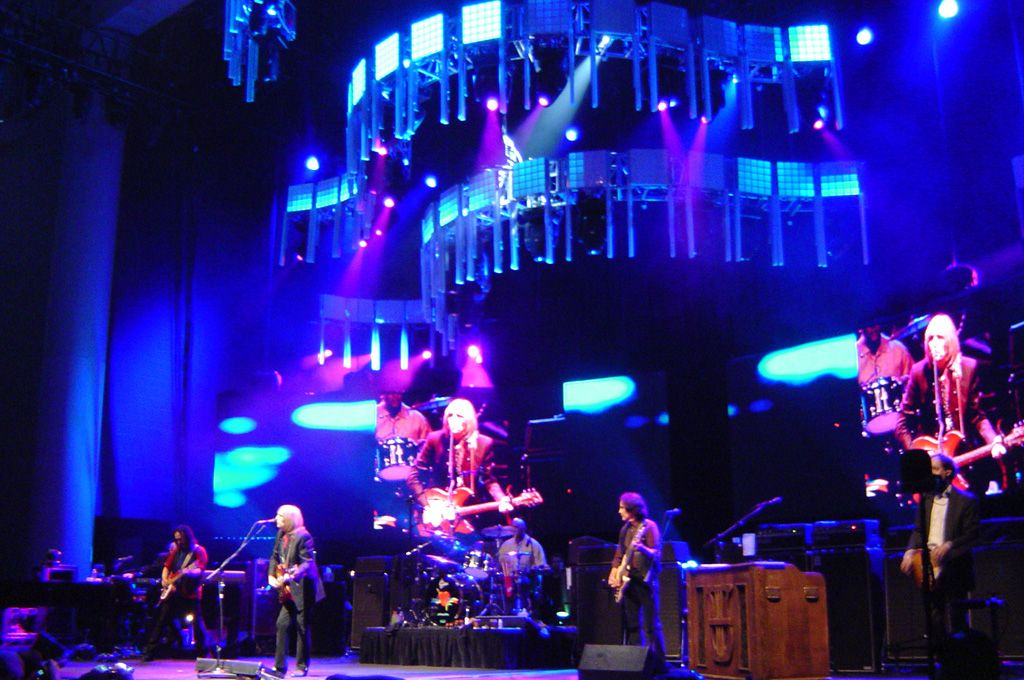
Tom Petty and the Heartbreakers performing at the Verizon Amphitheatre in Indianapolis in 2006

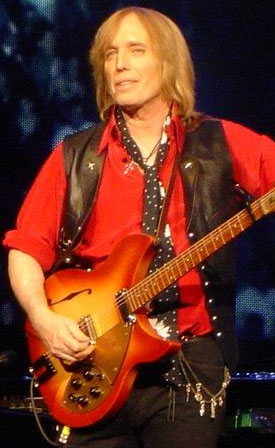
Petty performing at the Nissan Pavilion in Bristow, Virginia in 2006

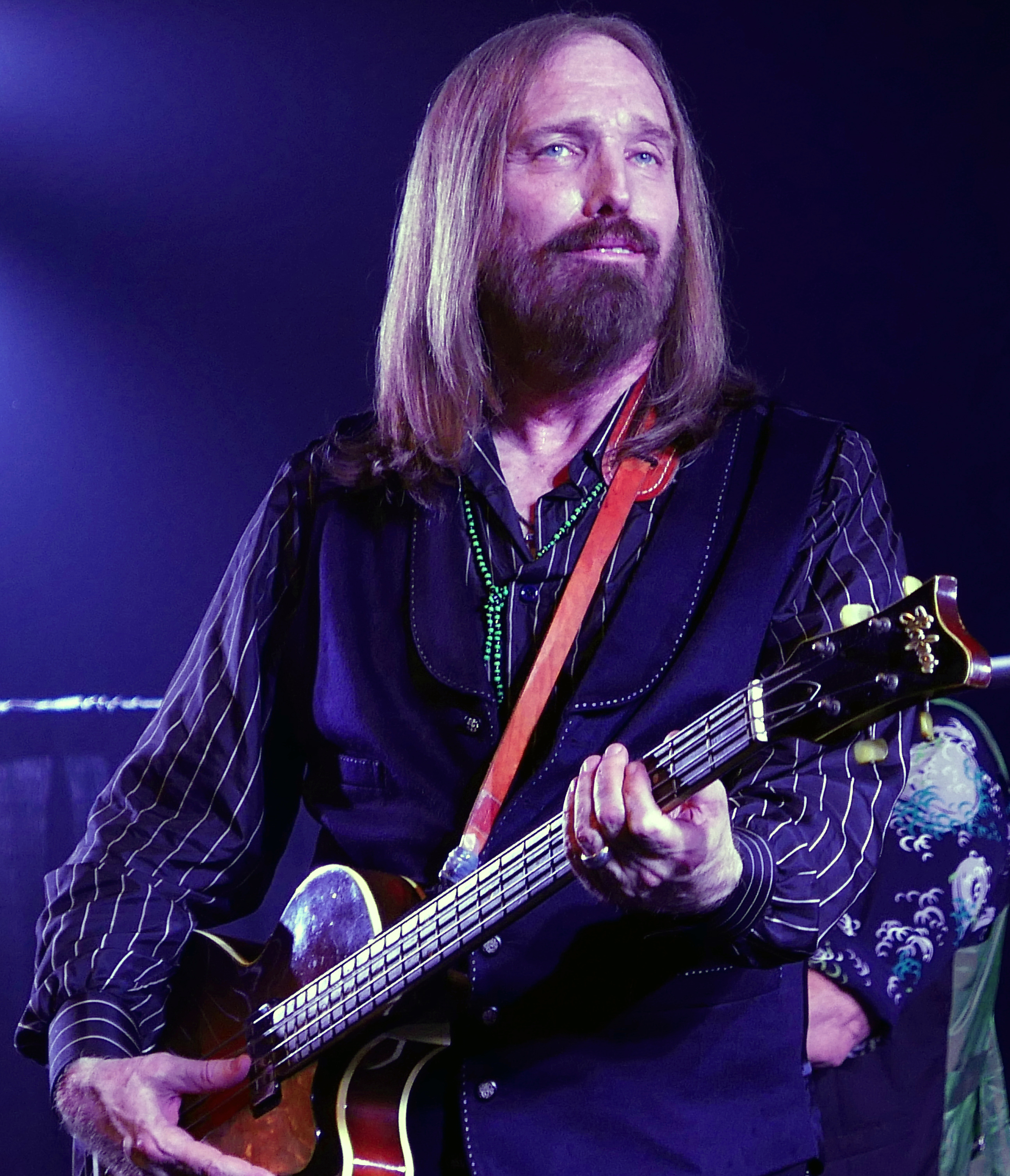
Petty performing in San Francisco in 2016

In 1989, while still under contract to MCA, Petty secretly signed a lucrative deal with Warner Bros. Records, to which the Traveling Wilburys had been signed. His first album on his new label, 1994's Wildflowers, Petty's second of three solo albums, included the highly beloved title track, as well as the singles "You Don't Know How It Feels", "You Wreck Me", "It's Good to Be King", and "A Higher Place". The album, produced by Rick Rubin, sold over three million copies in the United States.

In 1996, Petty, with the Heartbreakers, released a soundtrack to the movie She's the One starring Cameron Diaz and Jennifer Aniston (see Songs and Music from "She's the One"). The album's singles were "Walls (Circus)" featuring Lindsey Buckingham, "Climb that Hill", and a song written by Lucinda Williams, "Change the Locks". The album also included a cover of "Asshole", a song by Beck. The same year, the band accompanied Johnny Cash on Unchained, provisionally titled "Petty Cash", for which Cash won a Grammy for Best Country Album. Cash later covered Petty's "I Won't Back Down" on American III: Solitary Man.

In 1999, Tom Petty and the Heartbreakers released their last album with Rubin at the helm, Echo. Two songs were released as singles in the US, "Room at the Top" and "Free Girl Now". The album reached number 10 on the US album charts.

Tom Petty and the Heartbreakers played "I Won't Back Down" at the America: A Tribute to Heroes benefit concert for victims of the September 11, 2001 attacks. The following year, they played "Taxman", "I Need You" and "Handle with Care" (joined for the last by Jeff Lynne, Dhani Harrison, and Jim Keltner) at the Concert for George in honor of Petty's friend and former bandmate George Harrison.

Petty's 2002 release, The Last DJ, was an album-length critique of practices within the music industry. The title track, inspired by Los Angeles radio personality Jim Ladd, bemoaned the end of the freedom that radio DJs once had to personally select songs for their station's playlists. The album peaked at number nine on the Billboard 200 album chart in the United States.

In 2005, Petty began hosting his own show "Buried Treasure" on XM Satellite Radio, on which he shared selections from his personal record collection.

In 2006, Tom Petty and the Heartbreakers headlined the fifth annual Bonnaroo Music and Arts Festival as part of their "30th Anniversary Tour". Special guests included Stevie Nicks, Pearl Jam, the Allman Brothers Band, Trey Anastasio, the Derek Trucks Band, and the Black Crowes. Nicks joined Petty and the Heartbreakers on stage for several songs including "Stop Draggin' My Heart Around".

In July 2006, Petty released a solo album titled Highway Companion, which included the hit "Saving Grace". It debuted at number four on the Billboard 200, which was Petty's highest chart position since the introduction of the Nielsen SoundScan system for tracking album sales in 1991. Highway Companion was briefly promoted on the tour with the Heartbreakers in 2006, with performances of "Saving Grace", "Square One", "Down South" and "Flirting with Time".

During the summer of 2007, Petty reunited with his old bandmates Tom Leadon and Randall Marsh, along with Heartbreakers Benmont Tench and Mike Campbell, to reform his pre-Heartbreakers band Mudcrutch. The quintet recorded an album of 14 songs that was released on April 29, 2008 (on iTunes, an additional song "Special Place" was available if the album was pre-ordered). The band supported the album with a brief tour of California in the spring of 2008.

In 2007, Tom Petty and the Heartbreakers contributed a cover of "I'm Walkin'" to the album Goin' Home: A Tribute to Fats Domino. The album's sales helped buy instruments for students in New Orleans public schools and contributed to the building of a community center in the city's Hurricane Katrina-damaged Ninth Ward.

On February 3, 2008, Tom Petty and the Heartbreakers performed during the halftime-show of Super Bowl XLII at the University of Phoenix Stadium. They played "American Girl", "I Won't Back Down", "Free Fallin" and "Runnin' Down a Dream". That summer, the band toured North America with Steve Winwood as the opening act. Winwood joined Petty and the Heartbreakers on stage at select shows and performed his Spencer Davis Group hit "Gimme Some Lovin'", and occasionally he performed his Blind Faith hit "Can't Find My Way Home". In November 2009 the boxed set The Live Anthology, a compilation of live recordings from 1978 to 2006, was released.

The band's twelfth album Mojo was released on June 15, 2010, and reached number two on the Billboard 200 album chart. Petty described the album as "Blues-based. Some of the tunes are longer, more jam-y kind of music. A couple of tracks really sound like the Allman Brothers—not the songs but the atmosphere of the band." To promote the record, the band appeared as the musical guests on Saturday Night Live on May 17, 2010. The release of Mojo was followed by a North American summer tour. Prior to the tour, five of the band's guitars, including two owned by Petty, were stolen from their practice space in Culver City, California in April 2010. The items were recovered by Los Angeles police the next week.

In 2012, the band went on a world tour that included their first European dates in 20 years and their first ever concerts in the Canadian provinces of Nova Scotia and Newfoundland and Labrador.

On July 28, 2014, Reprise Records released Tom Petty and the Heartbreakers' thirteenth studio album, Hypnotic Eye. The album debuted at number one on the Billboard 200, becoming the band's first album to top the chart. On November 20, 2015, the Tom Petty Radio channel debuted on SiriusXM.

In 2017, the Heartbreakers embarked on a 40th Anniversary Tour of the United States. The tour began on April 20 in Oklahoma City and ended on September 25 with a performance at the Hollywood Bowl in Hollywood, California. The Hollywood Bowl concert, which would ultimately be the Heartbreakers' final show, ended with a performance of "American Girl".

On September 28, 2018, Reprise Records released An American Treasure, a 60-track career-spanning box set featuring dozens of previously unreleased recordings, alternate versions of classic songs, rarities, historic live performances and deep tracks. The box set was preceded by the first single, "Keep A Little Soul", in July 2018. The song is an unreleased outtake originally recorded in 1982 during the Long After Dark sessions.

In July 2024, the Petty estate signed a deal with Warner Chappell Music to distribute Petty's entire catalog.

=== Acting ===
Petty's first appearance in film took place in 1978, when he had a cameo in FM. He later had a small part in 1987's Made in Heaven and appeared in several episodes of It's Garry Shandling's Show between 1987 and 1990, playing himself as one of Garry Shandling's neighbors. Petty was also featured in Shandling's other show, The Larry Sanders Show, as one of the story within a story final guests. In the episode, Petty gets bumped from the show and nearly comes to blows with Greg Kinnear.

Petty appeared in the 1997 film The Postman, directed by and starring Kevin Costner, as the Bridge City Mayor (from the dialogue it is implied that he is playing a future history version of himself). In 2002, he appeared on The Simpsons in the episode "How I Spent My Strummer Vacation", along with Mick Jagger, Keith Richards, Lenny Kravitz, Elvis Costello, and Brian Setzer. In it, Petty spoofed himself as a tutor to Homer Simpson on the art of lyric writing, composing a brief song about a drunk girl driving down the road while concerned with the state of public schools. Later in the episode, he loses a toe during a riot.

Petty had a recurring role as the voice of Elroy "Lucky" Kleinschmidt in the animated comedy series King of the Hill from 2004 to 2009. In 2010, Petty made a five-second cameo appearance with comedian Andy Samberg in a musical video titled "Great Day" featured on the bonus DVD as part of The Lonely Island's new album Turtleneck & Chain.

== Views on artistic control ==
Petty was known as a staunch guardian of his artistic control and artistic freedom. In 1979, he was involved in a legal dispute when ABC Records was sold to MCA Records. He refused to be transferred to another record label without his consent. In May 1979, he filed for bankruptcy and was signed to the new MCA subsidiary Backstreet Records.

In early 1981, the upcoming Tom Petty and the Heartbreakers album, which would become Hard Promises, was slated to be the next MCA release with the new list price of $9.98, following Steely Dan's Gaucho and the Olivia Newton-John/Electric Light Orchestra Xanadu soundtrack. This so-called "superstar pricing" was $1.00 more than the usual list price of $8.98. Petty voiced his objections to the price hike in the press and the issue became a popular cause among music fans. Non-delivery of the album and naming it Eight Ninety-Eight were considered, but eventually MCA decided against the price increase.

In 1987, Petty sued tire company B.F. Goodrich for $1 million for using a song very similar to his song "Mary's New Car" in a TV commercial. The ad agency that produced the commercial had previously sought permission to use Petty's song but was refused. A judge issued a temporary restraining order prohibiting further use of the ad and the suit was later settled out of court. Petty also disallowed George W. Bush from using "I Won't Back Down" for his 2000 presidential campaign. His family would do the same for Donald Trump in 2020, stating "Tom Petty would never want a song of his used for a campaign of hate."

Some outlets have claimed that the Red Hot Chili Peppers single "Dani California", released in May 2006, bears a close musical similarity to Petty's "Mary Jane's Last Dance". Petty told Rolling Stone, "I seriously doubt that there is any negative intent there. And a lot of rock 'n' roll songs sound alike. Ask Chuck Berry. The Strokes took 'American Girl' for their song 'Last Nite', and I saw an interview with them where they actually admitted it. That made me laugh out loud. I was like, 'OK, good for you' ... If someone took my song note for note and stole it maliciously, then maybe [I'd sue]. But I don't believe in lawsuits much. I think there are enough frivolous lawsuits in this country without people fighting over pop songs."

In January 2015, it was revealed that Petty and Jeff Lynne would receive royalties from Sam Smith's song "Stay with Me" after its writers acknowledged similarities between it and "I Won't Back Down". Petty and co-composer Lynne were each awarded 12.5% of the royalties from "Stay with Me", and their names were added to the ASCAP song credit. Petty clarified that he did not believe Smith plagiarized him, saying, "All my years of songwriting have shown me these things can happen. Most times you catch it before it gets out the studio door but in this case it got by. Sam's people were very understanding of our predicament and we easily came to an agreement".

== Personal life ==
Petty overcame a difficult relationship with his father. He said his father found it difficult to accept that Petty was "a mild-mannered kid who was interested in the arts" and subjected him to verbal and physical abuse on a regular basis. Petty described his father as a "wild, gambling drinker guy". He was close to his mother and his brother, Bruce.

Petty married Jane Benyo in 1974. They had two daughters: Adria, a director, and Annakim, an artist. Benyo told mutual friend Stevie Nicks that she met Petty at "the age of seventeen". Nicks misheard Benyo's North Florida accent, inspiring the title of her song "Edge of Seventeen". Petty and Benyo divorced in 1996.

On May 17, 1987, an arsonist set fire to Petty's house in Encino, California. Firefighters were able to salvage the basement recording studio and the original tapes stored there, as well as his Gibson Dove acoustic guitar. However, his signature gray top hat was destroyed. The perpetrator was never caught.

Petty struggled with heroin addiction following his divorce from Benyo. He cited the emotional pain of the divorce as a cause. He got clean after going to rehab in 1999, crediting his then-girlfriend Dana York with saving his life by helping him seek treatment.

On June 3, 2001, Petty and York were married in Las Vegas. They married again at their home in Malibu on June 21. Little Richard officiated the wedding, and an all-female mariachi band performed. York had a son from a previous marriage, Dylan.

Petty spoke in 2014 of the benefits from his practice of Transcendental Meditation.

== Death ==
On October 1, 2017, Petty's wife Dana York found him not breathing and in cardiac arrest at their home. He was resuscitated and taken to the UCLA Medical Center in Santa Monica, California, where he was put on life support. He died at 8:40 p.m. PDT on October 2. There had been premature reports of his death throughout the day.

Petty's memorial service was held at the Self-Realization Fellowship Lake Shrine in Pacific Palisades, Los Angeles, on October 16, 2017.

On January 19, 2018, the Los Angeles County Medical Examiner announced that Petty's death was due to an "accidental overdose" stating "multisystem organ failure due to resuscitated cardiopulmonary arrest due to mixed drug toxicity", a combination of fentanyl, oxycodone, acetylfentanyl and despropionyl fentanyl (all opioids); temazepam and alprazolam (both benzodiazepines); and citalopram (an antidepressant). In a statement on his website, Petty's wife and daughter said he had a number of medical problems, including emphysema, knee difficulties "and most significantly a fractured hip". He was prescribed pain medication for these problems and informed on the day of his death that his hip injury had worsened. The statement read, "[it] is our feeling that the pain was simply unbearable and was the cause for his overuse of medication.[..] We feel confident that this was, as the coroner found, an unfortunate accident."

On September 23, 2018, Petty's widow Dana gave an interview to Billboard saying that Petty put off hip surgery his doctors had recommended for some time. "He'd had it in mind it was his last tour and he owed it to his long-time crew, from decades some of them, and his fans." Dana said that Petty was in a good mood the day before his death: "He had those three shows in L.A. Never had he been so proud of himself, so happy, so looking forward to the future—and then he's gone."

== Equipment ==
Petty owned and used a number of guitars over the years. Throughout his career, he primarily played a sunburst 1964 Fender Stratocaster owned by fellow Heartbreakers member Mike Campbell. His primary acoustic guitar was a 1964 Gibson Dove. Petty was also known for his usage of Rickenbacker guitars, which he frequently played from 1979 onwards. The Rickenbacker 660/12TP neck was designed by Petty and featured his signature from 1991 to 1997. He also extensively played several Fender Telecasters and a Guild D25 12-string acoustic.

Petty's later amplifier setup featured two Fender Vibro-King 60-watt combos.

== Awards and honors ==
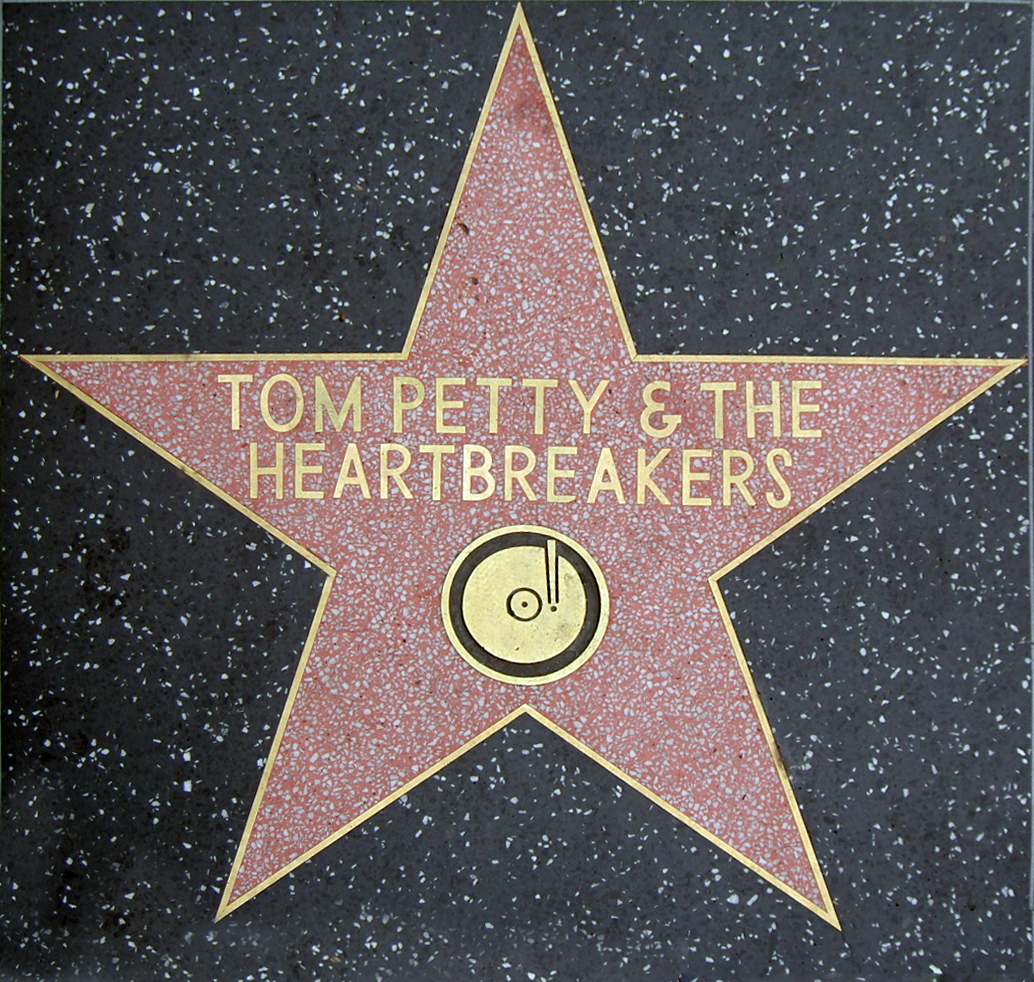
In 1999, Tom Petty and the Heartbreakers received a star on the Hollywood Walk of Fame.

In October 1981, and again in September 2006, Tom Petty and the Heartbreakers received the keys to the city of Gainesville, Florida, where he and his bandmates either lived or grew up.

In 1994, You Got Lucky, a Petty tribute album featuring such bands as Everclear and Silkworm was released.

In April 1996, Petty received UCLA's George Gershwin and Ira Gershwin Award for Lifetime Musical Achievement. The next month, Petty won the American Society of Composers, Authors and Publishers' Golden Note Award.

Tom Petty and the Heartbreakers received a star on the Hollywood Walk of Fame in 1999, for their contribution to the recording industry.

In December 2001, Tom Petty and the Heartbreakers were inducted into the Rock and Roll Hall of Fame, which further honored Petty with an exhibit of his items from July 2006 until 2007.

He is ranked 91st on Rolling Stone's list of the Greatest Artists of All Time.

Petty received the Billboard Century Award, the organization's highest honor for creative achievement on December 6, 2005.

Peter Bogdanovich's documentary film on Petty's career titled Runnin' Down a Dream premiered at the New York Film Festival in October 2007.

Petty was honored as MusiCares Person of the Year in February 2017 for his contributions to music and for his philanthropy.

A week after his death in 2017, a tribute to Petty was painted on Gainesville's Southwest 34th Street Wall. It reads "Love you always, Gainesville No. 1 Son, Thanks, Tommy".

Starting on October 7, 2017, five days after Petty's death, I Won't Back Down has been played at every Florida Gators football home game at Ben Hill Griffin Stadium following the conclusion of the 3rd Quarter, after We Are the Boys from Old Florida is played by the band.

In October 2018, on what would have been the singer's 68th birthday, the city of Gainesville renamed Northeast Park, where a young Petty had often visited, to Tom Petty Park.

In December 2021, the University of Florida board of trustees unanimously voted to posthumously award Petty with an honorary PhD from the school.

He has three albums, Wildflowers (No. 214), Damn the Torpedoes (No. 231), and Full Moon Fever (No. 298), on Rolling Stone magazine's 500 Greatest Albums of All Time list. He has two songs on the same magazine's 500 Greatest Songs of All Time list: "American Girl" (No. 169) and "Free Fallin'" (No. 219).

In October 2022, the University of Florida's Pride of the Sunshine dedicated their halftime show to Tom Petty's music as part of the university's inaugural Tom Petty Day.The band would continue their tribute performances to Petty during halftime at several other games throughout the 2022–23 football season.

In December 2023, Petty's song "Love Is a Long Road" was used in the first trailer for Grand Theft Auto VI, which is considered one of the most anticipated video games ever made. This trailer gained over 90 million YouTube views within the first 24 hours. Because of this immense bump in popularity, the song itself gained nearly 1 million YouTube views in the same time span, gained a 36,979% increase on Spotify, had almost 250,000 searches on Shazam, and ranked second on the worldwide iTunes chart.

== Discography ==
=== With the Heartbreakers ===
- Tom Petty and the Heartbreakers (1976)
- You're Gonna Get It! (1978)
- Damn the Torpedoes (1979)
- Hard Promises (1981)
- Long After Dark (1982)
- Southern Accents (1985)
- Let Me Up (I've Had Enough) (1987)
- Into the Great Wide Open (1991)
- Songs and Music from "She's the One" (1996)
- Echo (1999)
- The Last DJ (2002)
- Mojo (2010)
- Hypnotic Eye (2014)

=== With the Traveling Wilburys ===
- Traveling Wilburys Vol. 1 (1988)
- Traveling Wilburys Vol. 3 (1990)

=== Solo ===
- Full Moon Fever (1989)
- Wildflowers (1994)
- Highway Companion (2006)

=== With Mudcrutch ===
- Mudcrutch (2008)
- 2 (2016)

=== Posthumously ===
- An American Treasure (2018)
- The Best of Everything (2019)
- Wildflowers & All the Rest (2020)
- Finding Wildflowers: Alternate Versions (2021)
- Angel Dream (Songs and Music from the Motion Picture 'She's the One') (2021)
- Live at the Fillmore 1997 (2022)
- Long After Dark (Deluxe Edition) (2024)

== Filmography ==
Film
Year	Title	Role	Notes
1978	FM	Himself	
1987	Made in Heaven	Stanky	
1996	She's the One	—N/a	Soundtrack
1997	The Postman	Bridge City Mayor	
2007	Tom Petty and the Heartbreakers: Runnin' Down a Dream	Himself	Music Documentary
2013	Sound City	Himself	Music Documentary
2018	Elvis Presley: The Searcher	Himself	Music Documentary
2019	Echo in the Canyon	Himself	Music Documentary
2021	Tom Petty: Somewhere You Feel Free	Himself	Music Documentary
Television
Year	Title	Role	Notes
1979–2010	Saturday Night Live	Himself (musical guest)	8 episodes — "Buck Henry/Tom Petty & The Heartbreakers" (1979) — "Howard Hesseman/Tom Petty & The Heartbreakers" (1983) — "Steve Martin/Tom Petty & the Heartbreakers" (1989) — "Kirstie Alley/Tom Petty & the Heartbreakers" (1992) — "John Turturro/Tom Petty & the Heartbreakers" (1994) — "Tom Hanks/Tom Petty & the Heartbreakers" (1996) — "John Goodman/Tom Petty & The Heartbreakers" (1999) — "Alec Baldwin/Tom Petty & the Heartbreakers" (2010)
1987–89	It's Garry Shandling's Show	Himself	4 episodes — "It's Garry Shandling's Christmas Show" (1987) — "No Baby, No Show" (1987) — "Vegas: Part 1" (1989) — "Vegas: Part 2" (1989)
1989	Biography	Himself (interviewee)	Episode: "Johnny Cash: The Man in Black"
1994	Tom Petty: Going Home	Himself	TV documentary
1998	The Larry Sanders Show	Himself	Episode: "Flip"
1999	Behind the Music	Himself	Episode: "Tom Petty & the Heartbreakers"
2002	The Simpsons	Himself (voice role)	Episode: "How I Spent My Strummer Vacation"
2004–09	King of the Hill	Lucky (voice role)	Recurring role; 28 episodes
2008	Super Bowl XLII	Himself	Halftime show Credited as Tom Petty and the Heartbreakers

== Works ==
- Petty, Tom; Bogdanovich, Peter (October 25, 2007). Zanes, Warren (ed.). Runnin' Down a Dream: Tom Petty and the Heartbreakers. Chronicle Books. ISBN 978-0-811-86201-1 – via archive.org.

== See also ==
- List of American Grammy Award winners and nominees
- List of artists who reached number one on the US Mainstream Rock chart
