= Howie Epstein =

American musician (1955–2003)

Background information
- Born: Howard Norman Epstein; July 21, 1955; Milwaukee, Wisconsin, U.S.
- Died: February 23, 2003 (aged 47) Santa Fe, New Mexico, U.S.
- Occupations: Musician, songwriter, producer
- Instruments: Bass guitar, vocals, guitar, mandolin
- Formerly of: Tom Petty and the Heartbreakers

Howard Norman Epstein (July 21, 1955 – February 23, 2003) was an American musician best known as the bassist in Tom Petty and the Heartbreakers.

== Early life ==
Epstein was born in Milwaukee, Wisconsin. He grew up in a musical household. Epstein's father, Sam, was a top local record producer who worked with various rock and roll and soul groups in the 1950s and 1960s. Epstein graduated from Nicolet High School in Glendale, Wisconsin. He was Jewish.

== Career ==
In the late 1960s and early 1970s, Howie played mostly rhythm guitar or mandolin. He also sang in a number of both rock and roll and country Milwaukee bands that were regionally popular, including MHB Experience, Egz, Winks, Forearm Smash, and The Craze. When he felt he had gone as far as he could go in Milwaukee, Epstein decided to move to New York City. However, before he could pack his gear, he was lured to the West Coast by a drummer friend to play bass in a new band that singer-songwriter John Hiatt was forming in Los Angeles. He stuck with Hiatt for two years and two albums (Slug Line and Two Bit Monsters).

=== The Heartbreakers ===
While playing on a Del Shannon album that Tom Petty was producing (Drop Down and Get Me), Epstein impressed Petty with his ability. Consequently, when Ron Blair, who had been bassist with Tom Petty and The Heartbreakers since the band's inception in 1976, announced that he was quitting due to burnout, Epstein was recruited to replace him. Epstein joined the band in late 1981.

Epstein found a natural style, which he said emphasized "simplicity, playing in the pocket, getting into a steady groove. I've always considered myself a good team player and that's the way that the Heartbreakers operate. Everyone listens to what everyone else is doing musically." On September 1, 1982, Epstein made his live debut at the Santa Cruz Civic Auditorium in Santa Cruz, California, on the tour to promote the album, Long After Dark.

In 1990, Petty made the following comments about Epstein:

You gotta love him, I don't know if I ever tell him how good he is. Tonight, there was a line early in the show I could just barely sing. I was having to work harder than I normally do to make it, I was getting really close on the mic. I was thinking, 'Oh boy, I hope I can do this ... ' I got to it and I heard Howie singing it with me over his mic. It sounded great, it sounded like a double track. I just looked at him, he caught my eye like 'Yeah!' It made me feel great, 'cause I know he was thinking the same thing, 'I know he's tired, I'll cover him. Wham! Got it!' That's what a great band's all about. That's what it's all about.

In 2002, Epstein was fired from the band due to his substance addiction. He was replaced with the returning Ron Blair. He made his final appearance with the Heartbreakers when the band was inducted into the Rock and Roll Hall of Fame in March 2002. In later interviews, Petty admitted that Epstein's behavior had become unpredictable: "He was just degenerating on us to the point where we thought keeping Howie in the band was actually doing him more harm than getting rid of him. His personal problems were vast and serious."

=== Collaborations ===
Epstein played bass on recordings by Eric Andersen, Bob Dylan, Carlene Carter, Johnny Cash, John Hiatt, Stevie Nicks, Roy Orbison, Carl Perkins, John Prine, Linda Ronstadt, Del Shannon, The Textones, The Village People and Warren Zevon.

Epstein earned acclaim as a songwriter and a producer. Epstein produced two albums for John Prine, 1991's The Missing Years, which won a Grammy Award for Best Contemporary Folk Recording, and Lost Dogs and Mixed Blessings.

== Personal life and death ==
Epstein formed a creative and personal partnership with Carlene Carter, after the end of her marriage to musician Nick Lowe. She is the daughter of country music stars June Carter Cash and Carl Smith and stepdaughter of country music star Johnny Cash.

Epstein produced Carter's hit album I Fell in Love (1990) and co-authored the title track with his longtime collaborator Perry M. Lamek. Epstein and Carter were romantically involved as well as professionally linked.

In 2001, Epstein and Carter were "arrested in New Mexico with black tar heroin and a large amount of drug paraphernalia". At Petty's urging, Epstein later entered a drug rehabilitation center.

On February 23, 2003, Epstein died from complications related to drug use. MTV News reported that Epstein's death was caused by a heroin overdose. He was 47. Investigators were told Epstein had been using heroin. On the day of his death, Epstein was driven to St. Vincent Hospital in Santa Fe, New Mexico, by his girlfriend, who described him as "under distress". Epstein was taking antibiotics for an illness and had recently suffered from influenza, stomach problems, and an abscess on his leg, friends said.

In response to Epstein's death, Petty wrote the following in an article for Rolling Stone: "...there's a great sadness, because Howie was never not a Heartbreaker. He just got to where he couldn't do it anymore... It's like you got a tree dying in the backyard. And you're kind of used to the idea that it's dying. But you look out there one day and they cut it down. And you just can't imagine that beautiful tree isn't there anymore."

Epstein was survived by his brothers, Craig and Bradley Epstein, and by his daughter, Jamie Leffler. He was interred at Second Home Cemetery in Greenfield, Wisconsin.
