= Tift Merritt =

American singer-songwriter and musician (born 1975)

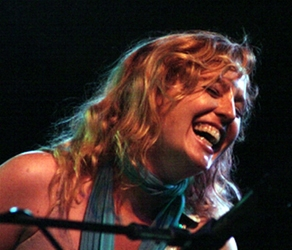
- Merritt on stage in Silk Hope, NC in 2005.

Background information
- Born: Catherine Tift Merritt; January 8, 1975 (age 51); Houston, Texas, United States
- Origin: Raleigh, North Carolina, United States
- Genres: Country folk; Americana; alternative country
- Occupations: Musician; songwriter
- Instruments: Vocals; guitar; keyboards; piano; harmonica
- Years active: 1998–present
- Labels: Lost Highway; Fantasy; Yep Roc
- Website: tiftmerritt.com

Catherine Tift Merritt (born January 8, 1975) is an American singer-songwriter and musician. She has released seven studio albums and was nominated for a Grammy Award for Best Country Album for Tambourine. Merritt is a board member of the Artist Rights Alliance and is a Practitioner-in-Residence at the Franklin Humanities Institute at Duke University.

== Early life and education ==
Merritt was born in Houston and grew up in Raleigh. She credits her father's eclectic taste in music as a major influence. At the age of 20, Merritt enrolled at the University of North Carolina at Chapel Hill to study creative writing, where she studied under Doris Betts.

== Career ==
Merritt joined a band called the Carbines and played small clubs in the cities of Chapel Hill and Raleigh. In 1998, the band released a 7-inch single, "Jukejoint Girl," and in 1999 the album The Two Dollar Pistols with Tift Merritt on Yep Roc Records.

In 2000, Merritt won the MerleFest's Chris Austin Songwriting Contest and in 2002 released her debut album, Bramble Rose. The record landed on the top ten lists for both Time and The New Yorker, and was called the best debut of the year by the Associated Press. While touring to promote Bramble Rose, Merritt opened for fellow North Carolinian Ryan Adams, who had helped her secure her first management and record contracts.

Her follow-up release, 2004's Tambourine, was produced by George Drakoulias and featured backing by Benmont Tench, Mike Campbell, Neal Casal and Don Heffington. The album was nominated for the Best Country Album Grammy Award in 2004. She was nominated for Americana Music Association: Album of the Year, Artist of the Year, and Song of the Year in 2005 Merritt's performance on Austin City Limits was released as a DVD on New West Records. A sold-out concert at the North Carolina Museum of Art in Raleigh, North Carolina, was released under the title Home Is Loud that same year.

Her next album, Another Country was released on Fantasy Records in 2008. The record was produced by George Drakoulias and featured guitarists Charlie Sexton and Doug Pettibone. Despite her Grammy nomination, Lost Highway Records dropped Merritt after Tambourine and Merritt felt "clueless by the decision and tapped of her energy." Merritt wrote the new album in a Paris apartment, "a city where she knew all of two people and didn't speak the language at all." Paste magazine gave the album a four-star review. The song "Broken" was nominated for an Americana Music Award for Song of the Year.

Her EP, Please Break the Silence of the Middle of the Night, was released on January 1, 2008, by the Concord Music Group as an iTunes exclusive. While touring England, Merritt played a piano at the University of Buckingham's Radcliffe Centre for music and lectures, a building that had formerly been a church. "She thought the amazing acoustics and inspiring ambiance would make an ideal setting for a live acoustic-solo record." The record Buckingham Solo was recorded live on November 29, 2008 and released on Fantasy Records on April 18, 2009.

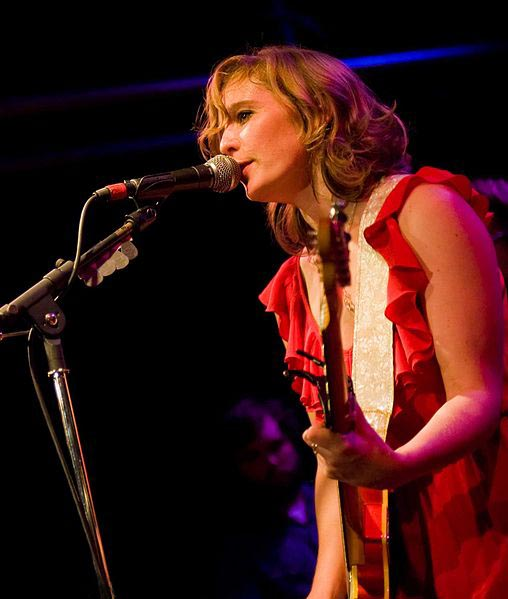
Merritt on stage in Seattle in 2010

Merritt's album, See You on the Moon, was released in June 2010 on Fantasy Records. Her next album, Traveling Alone, was released on Yep Roc Records in October 2012. The album was produced by Tucker Martine and featured Marc Ribot on guitar and Calexico's John Convertino on percussion. Merritt announced that Traveling Alone would be re-released in a 10th Anniversary Edition on November 4, 2022.

In 2013, Merritt collaborated with Simone Dinnerstein on an album that bridged both of their musical interests called Night. The track listing includes traditional American songs like The Wayfaring Stranger, a cover of Johnny Nash, as well as classical music like "Dido's Lament" from Henry Purcell's opera Dido and Aeneas.

The Grammy Museum hosted Merritt as part of their Spotlight series in 2013. Tift participated in a Q&A with the audience as well as performing for the audience.

In 2013, Merritt released Traveling Companion on Yep Roc. Her album Stitch of the World came out in 2017.

Meritt created a new site in 2023 where she has shared interviews with other musicians on The Spark—originally an interview program she hosted for Marfa Public Radio—including Rosanne Cash and Rhiannon Giddens. In her Nightcap series, she has posted some "project threads" including covers of Black Boys on Mopeds by Sinead O'Connor and 9 to 5 by Dolly Parton: "Long before a project turns forward facing, beta tests, questions, failed drafts, surprise pleasures, writing, music and laughter line the walls."

In 2025, Merritt marked the 20th anniversary of her Grammy-nominated album Tambourine with the reissue of the original record as well as a companion collection of home demos and unreleased material, Time and Patience: Tambourine Kitchen Recordings on One Riot Records. Merritt describes the "kitchen recordings" this way: "These songs weren’t hits. I was a good writer, not a great one. My band wasn’t good enough. At least that’s what I was told.... But I believed in these demos back then—and it is a tender moment to bring them to you now, proudly, so much time and patience later." The reissue is dedicated to Neal Casal and Don Heffington, "cherished members of Merritt's original studio band."

Although Merritt has indicated that "I rarely tour these days and certainly not for long stretches of time", she appeared at the 2025 Glastonbury Festival and is on the schedule for the 2025 AmericanaFest.

Merritt has been the opening act for Joan Baez, Kris Kristofferson, and sang "The Star-Spangled Banner" for then-Senator Barack Obama at his last campaign rally.

== Reception ==
Merritt's sound has been described as "sonic short stories and poignant performances." She has been compared to artists like Joni Mitchell and Emmylou Harris.

A review in The New Yorker praised her and The Wall Street Journal included her in a weekend feature on singer-songwriters, describing her as "in the tradition of Joni Mitchell, James Taylor and Leonard Cohen".

== Personal life ==
In 2009, Merritt married Zeke Hutchins. They separated in late 2013. In 2016, she and Eric Heywood had a daughter named Jean.

== Discography ==
=== Studio albums ===
Title	Album details	Peak chart positions					Sales
Title	Album details	US	US Country	US Heat	US Indie	US Folk	Sales
Bramble Rose	Release date: June 4, 2002; Label: Lost Highway Records	—	47	—	—	—	
Tambourine	Release date: August 24, 2004; Label: Lost Highway Records	—	—	21	—	—	
Another Country	Release date: February 26, 2008; Label: Fantasy Records	156	—	1	—	—	
See You on the Moon	Release date: June 1, 2010; Label: Fantasy Records	—	—	6	—	7	
Traveling Alone	Release date: September 17, 2012; Label: Yep Roc Records	—	—	10	46	12	
Night (with Simone Dinnerstein)	Release date: March 2013; Label: Sony Classical	—	—	—	—	—	
Traveling Companion (Traveling Alone expanded version)	Release date: October 2013; Label: Yep Roc Records	—	—	—	—	—	
Stitch of the World	Release date: January 27, 2017; Label: Yep Roc Records	—	—	—	—	—	US: 3,900
Sugar	Release date: June 26, 2026; Label: One Riot Records	—	—	—	—	—	
"—" denotes releases that did not chart

=== Live albums ===
Title	Album details
Home Is Loud	Release date: 2005; Label: RCAM
Buckingham Solo	Release date: June 23, 2009; Label: Vella Recordings
Love Soldiers On (Concert at the Historic Playmakers Theatre)	Release date: April 10, 2020; Label: Yep Roc Records

=== Extended plays ===
Title	Album details
The Two Dollar Pistols with Tift Merritt	Release date: October 26, 1999; Label: Yep Roc Records
Please Break the Silence of the Middle of the Night	Release date: September 16, 2008; Label: Fantasy Records
Sweet Spot	Release date: January 24, 2012; Label: Yep Roc

=== Singles ===
Year	Single	Peak positions		Album
Year	Single	US AAA	US Country	Album
2002	"Neighborhood"	—	—	Bramble Rose
2004	"Good Hearted Man"	—	60	Tambourine
2004	"Stray Paper"	—	—	Tambourine
2008	"Broken"	28	—	Another Country
2010	"Mixtape"	—	—	See You on the Moon
2012	"To Myself"	—	—	Traveling Alone
2016	"Dusty Old Man"	—	—	Stitch of the World
2017	"Proclamation Bones"	—	—	Stitch of the World
"—" denotes releases that did not chart

=== Music videos ===
Year	Video	Director
2002	"Virginia, No One Can Warn You"	Douglas Avery
2004	"Good Hearted Man"	Philip Andelman
2008	"Broken"	Martyn Atkins
2010	"Engine to Turn"	John Hulme
2013	"Only in Songs / Night and Dreams"	

=== Appears on ===
- 2003: Chatham County Line – Chatham County Line (Bonfire)
- 2003: John Eddie – Who The Hell Is John Eddie? (Lost Highway
- 2003: Portastatic – Autumn Was a Lark (Merge)
- 2004: Chris Stamey – Travels in the South (Yep Roc)
- 2006: Sally Spring – Mockingbird (Sniffinpup)
- 2007: Charlie Louvin – Charlie Louvin (Tompkins Square)
- 2007: Teddy Thompson – Upfront & Down Low (Verve Forecast)
- 2010: Reto Burrell – Go (Echopark)
- 2014: Andrew Bird – Things Are Really Great Here, Sort Of… (Wegawam Music)
- 2016: Andrew Bird – Are You Serious (Loma Vista)
- 2016: Hiss Golden Messenger – Heart Like A Levee (Merge)

== Awards and nominations ==
Year	Association	Category	Result
2004	47th Grammy Awards	Country Album of the Year – Tambourine	Nominated
2005	Americana Music Association	Album of the Year – Tambourine	Nominated
2005	Americana Music Association	Artist of the Year	Nominated
2005	Americana Music Association	Song of the Year – "Good Hearted Man"	Nominated
2008	Americana Music Association	Song of the Year – "Broken"	Nominated
