= Russian Roulette (disambiguation) =

Russian roulette is a potentially lethal game of chance played with a revolver.

Russian roulette may also refer to:

== Film and television ==
- Russian Roulette (film), a 1975 film directed by Lou Lombardo
- Russian Roulette (game show), a game show produced by the Game Show Network

== Literature ==
- Russian Roulette (novel) by Anthony Horowitz
- "Russian Roulette" (January 1937), short story by Georges Surdez, published in Collier's Illustrated Weekly
- Russian Roulette (Isikoff and Corn book), Russian Roulette: The Inside Story of Putin's War on America and the Election of Donald Trump, 2018 non-fiction book by Michael Isikoff and David Corn
- Russian Roulette: How British Spies Thwarted Lenin's Plot for Global Revolution, 2013 non-fiction book by Giles Milton

== Mathematics ==
- Russian roulette integration, a variance reduction technique in Monte Carlo integration/simulation

== Music ==
=== Albums ===
- Russian Roulette (Accept album), or the title song
- Russian Roulette (The Hollies album), or the title song
- Russian Roulette (S.E.X. Appeal album), 2011
- Russian Roulette (Triumvirat album), 1980
- Russian Roulette (The Alchemist album)

=== Extended plays ===
- Russian Roulette (Ed Harcourt EP)
- Russian Roulette (Red Velvet EP), or the title song
- Russian Roulette (Spica EP)

=== Songs ===
- "Russian Roulette" (Rihanna song), 2009
- "Russian Roulette" (Red Velvet song), 2016
- "Russian Roulette", a song by Steve Aoki from his 2022 album Hiroquest: Genesis
- "Russian Roulette", a song by Lil Baby from his 2022 album It's Only Me
- "Russian Roulette", a song by 10 Years from their Division album
- "Russian Roulette", a song by The Lords of the New Church from their debut LP
- "Russian Roulette", a single by Tungevaag & Raaban with Charlie Who?, 2015
- "Russian Roulette", a song by Laban from their 1987 album Roulette
- "Russian Roulette", a song by Michelle Shocked from her 1989 album Captain Swing
- "Russian Roulette", a song by Kiss from their 2009 album Sonic Boom
- "Russian Roulette", a song by John Cale from his 1981 album Honi Soit
- "Russian Roulette", a song by Blue Stingrays from their 1997 album Surf-n-Burn
- "Russian Roulette", a song by Porter Robinson from his 2024 album Smile! :D
- "Russian Roulette", a song by Nessa Barrett from her 2024 album Aftercare
- "Ro Ro Ro Russian Roulette", a song by Meiko Nakahara; the theme song of the series Dirty Pair

== See also ==
- Rushing Roulette, a 1965 Merrie Melodies cartoon starring Wile E. Coyote and the Road Runner
