= Portastatic Hello EP =

Hello CD of the Month

EP by Portastatic
- Released: 1994
- Genre: Indie rock
- Label: Hello

Hello CD of the Month EP: February 1994 is a CD EP by the band Portastatic. It was released on the Hello label in 1994.

The Hello CD of the Month Club (Hello Recording Club) was a subscription-only record company that operated from 1993-1996 by John Flansburgh of They Might Be Giants and Marjorie Galen (at that time the wife of TMBG's manager, Jamie Kitman). Members would receive EPs of original recordings by original artists.

"Slant Roof" and "Flat Roof" are both instrumental tracks that would later appear on the Some Small History Bonus Tracks release (bonus download from Merge Records). Both were recorded to 4-track cassette.

"A Bear That Chokes" and "Why Pinch Yourself" would later appear on the Scrapbook EP. Both were recorded at Duck Kee Studios by Jerry Kee.

Mac McCaughan plays on all tracks. Jon Wurster played drums and Jennifer Walker played bass on "A Bear That Chokes." Ash Bowie played drums on "Why Pinch Yourself."

== Track listing ==
1. "Slant Roof"
2. "A Bear That Chokes"
3. "Why Pinch Yourself"
4. "Flat Roof"
