= External Combustion =

Studio album by Mike Campbell & The Dirty Knobs
- Released: March 4, 2022
- Studio: Hocus Pocus Recorders, California, US
- Genre: Rock
- Length: 44:42
- Language: English
- Label: BMG
- Producer: Mike Campbell; George Drakoulias

Mike Campbell & The Dirty Knobs chronology
Wreckless Abandon (2020)	External Combustion (2022)

You're right, I do write a lot. In some ways, staying home and not being able to tour was kind of normal for me. Because when I'm home, I'm very active with writing and I have a studio here. That didn't slow me down. I was regretful that we couldn't do the tour. But I think all of those dates are still sold and ready to go now. You know, some of the songs, I've noticed as I look back at them, I don't write about specific things necessarily. But as I look back at this album we just did, some of the lyrics seem to be indirectly about being isolated and trying to find a better world than you're in. [Laughs] So it might have been subliminal.

— Frontman Mike Campbell on writing, recording, and planning his first tour after the COVID-19 pandemic

External Combustion is the second studio album by American rock band Mike Campbell & The Dirty Knobs. The album was released by BMG Rights Management in 2023 to positive reviews and was supported by the first large-scale tour from the band, which included cover songs from Campbell's former group Tom Petty and the Heartbreakers, as well as songs from the band's debut album Wreckless Abandon.

== Reception ==
According to the review aggregator Metacritic, External Combustion received "generally favorable reviews" based on a weighted average score of 76 out of 100 from four critic scores. Editors at AllMusic rated this album 4 out of 5 stars, with critic Stephen Thomas Erlewine writing that while "this 2022 affair shares many of the same attributes" as the band's debut album Wreckless Abandon, "it's not quite as rough and garagey" resulting in "handsomely crafted classic rock played with flair, wit, and precision, elements that make familiar tropes seem fresh" comparable to Tom Petty and the Heartbreakers's 2014 release Hypnotic Eye. In Classic Rock, Claudia Elliott gave this release a 7 out of 10, calling it "another shot of hard-driving, foot-tapping rock'n'roll". Charles Waring gave External Combustion 3 out of 5 stars for Mojo and characterized the music as "grungy, scuzzy and for all the covert craft of the playing, unashamedly garage". At Ultimate Classic Rock, Gary Graff called this album "solid from start to finish" and stated that it "assures us that the Dirty Knobs are not a side-band lark but... a worthy full-time concern for Campbell and his talents". Bud Scoppa of Uncut rated this work an 8 out of 10 and highlighted many tracks, stating that the music ends "in a blaze of guitar glory".

== Track listing ==
All songs written by Mike Campbell.

1. "Wicked Mind" – 3:55
2. "Brigitte Bardot" – 3:23
3. "Cheap Talk" – 4:38
4. "External Combustion" – 4:11
5. "Dirty Job" – 4:13
6. "State of Mind" – 4:18
7. "Lightning Boogie" – 4:00
8. "Rat City" – 4:01
9. "In This Lifetime" – 3:37
10. "It Is Written" – 3:52
11. "Electric Gypsy" – 4:36

== Personnel ==
The Dirty Knobs

- Mike Campbell – lead guitar, vocals, production
- Matt Laug – drums, backing vocals
- Lance Morrison – bass guitar, backing vocals
- Jason Sinay – guitar, vocals

Additional personnel

- Chris Bellman – mastering for vinyl LP edition
- Charlie Bisharat – violin
- Katisse Buckingham – baritone saxophone, tenor saxophone
- Daphne Chen – strings, violin
- Giovanna Clayton – cello
- Dennis Dibrizzi – photography
- George Drakoulias – percussion, vocals, production
- Wrenne Evans – photography
- Ian Hunter – piano on "Dirty Job", vocals on "Dirty Job"
- Gabriel Johnson – trumpet
- Sheva Kafai – photography
- Leah Katz – viola
- Erm Navarro – trombone
- Chris Phelps – photography
- Martin Pradler – engineering, mixing, mastering
- Margo Price – vocals on "State of Mind", backing vocals on "Cheap Talk"
- Benmont Tench – piano on "Lightning Boogie"
- Patrick Warren – horn arrangements, string arrangements
- Miles Wintner – cover art, layout

== See also ==
- 2022 in American music
- Lists of 2022 albums
