= The Perfect Little Door =

The Perfect Little Door (CD EP)

EP by Portastatic
- Released: 2001
- Genre: Indie rock
- Label: Merge

The Perfect Little Door is CD EP by the band Portastatic. It was released on the Merge Records label in 2001.

According to the Merge Records website, the EP is "a collaboration between Mac McCaughan (Superchunk, Portastatic, etc) and Ken Vandermark (reed player extraordinaire) plus Tim Mulvenna (multi-faceted percussion)."

The five-song EP consists of new versions of three previously recorded Portastatic songs; a new version of Ken Vandermark's song "Late Night Wait Around"; and one entirely new song, "Hey Salty" (which would later appear in a re-worked version of its own on the Portstatic LP Summer of the Shark (2003).

The EP was recorded at Electrical Audio in Chicago, Illinois, while the band was in town for Noise Pop 2001.

== Track listing ==
1. "Had"
2. "Hey Salty"
3. "Late Night Wait Around"
4. "Broken Arm"
5. "When You Crashed"
