= Another Country (Tift Merritt album) =

Studio album by Tift Merritt
- Released: February 26, 2008
- Recorded: Dave's Room; North Hollywood, California
- Genre: Alternative country
- Length: 42:02
- Label: Fantasy
- Producer: George Drakoulias

Tift Merritt chronology
Home is Loud (2005)	Another Country (2008)	Buckingham Solo (2009)

Professional ratings
Review scores
Source	Rating
PopMatters	(8/10)
Allmusic	4/5 stars
Pitchfork Media	(5.0/10)
Slant	3.5/5 stars

Another Country is the third studio album by singer-songwriter Tift Merritt, released on February 26, 2008, by Fantasy Records. It was recorded in Los Angeles in the summer of 2007 with producer George Drakoulias, who had produced Merritt's previous studio album, Tambourine (2004).

The songs for the album were written by Merritt on the pianos in the apartments she rented during an extended solo trip to Paris, which she undertook after feeling worn out from continual touring. She has described the writing as a plainspoken look at the distance we all attempt to cross: between two people, between one heart and the rest of the world.

Its first week of release, "Broken", the album's first single, reached #1 on the Americana Radio Chart compiled by the Americana Music Association.

== Track listing ==
All songs written by Tift Merritt, unless otherwise noted.

No.	Title	Length
1.	"Something to Me"	4:11
2.	"Broken"	3:45
3.	"Another Country"	4:44
4.	"Hopes Too High"	3:34
5.	"Morning Is My Destination"	3:19
6.	"Keep You Happy"	5:08
7.	"I Know What I'm Looking for Now"	3:59
8.	"Tell Me Something True"	3:01
9.	"My Heart Is Free"	3:32
10.	"Tender Branch"	3:34
11.	"Mille Tendresses"	3:10
12.	"Heart Run Wild" (iTunes bonus track)	3:47

Bonus disc "Please Break the Silence of the Middle of the Night"
No.	Title	Writer(s)	Length
1.	"Morning Is My Destination" (Just Past Midnight Mix)		3:10
2.	"Tell Me Something True" (Solo Acoustic)		3:09
3.	"I Live for You"	George Harrison	2:33
4.	"Wayward and Weary"		4:01
5.	"Last to Know"		4:21

== Personnel ==
- Tift Merritt – vocals, guitar, piano
- Zeke Hutchins – drums
- Jay Brown – bass guitar, harmony vocals
- Danny Eisenberg – keyboards
- Charlie Sexton – guitars
- Doug Pettibone – guitars & pedal steel guitar (2, 10)
- Josh Schwartz – rhythm guitar
- George Drakoulias – acoustic guitar, percussion
- David Ralicky – horns
- Patrick Warren – Chamberlin

Technical

- George Drakoulias – producer
- David Bianco – recording engineer, mixing
- Rafael Serrano – assistant recording engineer
- Doug Sax (with Sangwook "Sunny" Nam) – mastering
- Mark Borthwick – photography
- Tommy Steele – art direction
