= Autumn Was a Lark =

EP by Portastatic
- Released: 2003
- Genre: Indie rock
- Label: Merge Records

Portastatic chronology
Summer of the Shark (2003)	Autumn Was a Lark (2003)	Bright Ideas (2005)

Professional ratings
Review scores
Source	Rating
AllMusic	4/5 stars
Pitchfork	7.3/10

Autumn Was a Lark is an EP by the band Portastatic. It was released on the Merge Records label in 2003.

The EP was recorded at Pox Studios in Durham, North Carolina, after the touring version of Portastatic finished the Summer of the Shark tour. During the tour the band learned several cover songs to "keep [themselves] happy" while playing warm up gigs at a venue called "The Cave" in Chapel Hill, North Carolina. At the end of the tour they decided to record three of these cover songs for release on this EP. In addition to the cover songs they also recorded one new original song, "Autumn Got Dark," and a reworked "full band" version of "In The Lines," from Summer of the Shark.

In addition to the 5 songs that comprise the actual EP, the CD also includes eight bonus tracks taken from two separate radio sessions (one from WPRB in Princeton, New Jersey and one from WERS in Boston, Massachusetts).

== Critical reception ==
Exclaim! wrote that "when [singer Mac McCaughan] steps to the piano for a spellbinding 'Isn't That the Way,' he sounds like he could be the hippest hotel piano bar singer in the world."

== Track listing ==
1. "Autumn Got Dark"
2. "Baby Blue" (Badfinger)
3. "Growin' Up" (Bruce Springsteen)
4. "In The Lines"
5. "One For The Road" (Ronnie Lane)
6. "Clay Cakes" *
7. "A Cunning Latch" *
8. "Bobby Jean" (Bruce Springsteen) *
9. "Don't Disappear" *
10. "You Know Where To Find Me" *
11. "Drill Me" **
12. "San Andreas" **
13. "Isn't That The Way" **

"*" – Bonus Track from WPRB, Princeton, NJ Radio Session. "**" – Bonus Track from WERS, Boston, MA Radio Session.
