= Ron Blair =

American musician (born 1948)

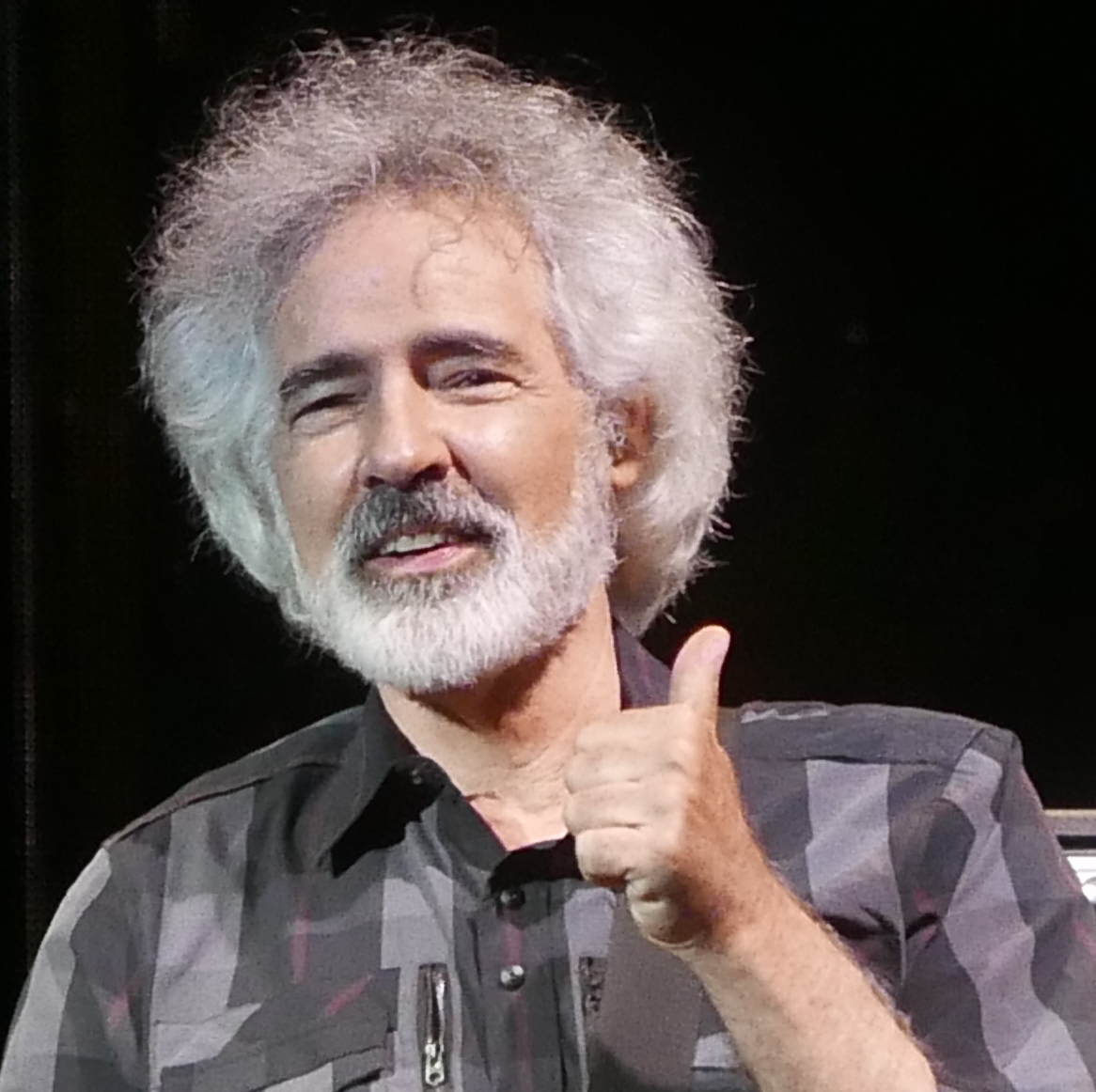
- Blair performing in 2017

Background information
- Also known as: Ron Blair; Ronnie Blair
- Born: Ronald Edward Blair; September 16, 1948 (age 78); San Diego, California, U.S.
- Genres: Rock, heartland rock
- Occupation: Musician
- Instrument: Bass guitar
- Years active: 1976–1986, 1997–present

Ronald Edward Blair (born September 16, 1948) is an American musician notable for being the bassist for Tom Petty and the Heartbreakers. He was originally the band's bassist from 1976 to 1981. In 2002, he returned to the group after a 20-year hiatus, replacing his own replacement, the late Howie Epstein.

== Biography ==
Blair's father served in the Navy. As such, the family relocated every few years throughout the United States; they also travelled within Japan and Hong Kong. As a teenager in Japan, Ron was in a locally famous rock band. However, it was the music scenes in Macon, Georgia, and Gainesville, Florida where Blair felt most at home. In Gainesville, Blair was a member of the band RGF. His sister is Janice Blair, a singer who was married to Gregg Allman from 1973 to 1975.

== Career ==
Blair eventually moved to Los Angeles. It was in L.A. where he teamed up with fellow Gainesville musicians Mike Campbell, Benmont Tench and Stan Lynch. Campbell and Tench, along with Tom Petty, had been members of the popular Gainesville band Mudcrutch. Mudcrutch had relocated from Gainesville to Los Angeles; the band subsequently broke up after being dropped from their record label. After the breakup, Tench recruited Campbell, Blair and Lynch to record demos in the hopes of getting a new record deal in Los Angeles. Meanwhile, Denny Cordell, president of Shelter Records, had kept Tom Petty on as a solo act. Petty met up with his former bandmates and Floridians and asked if they would like to become his band. They agreed, and soon became known as the Heartbreakers. Blair was the oldest member of the band.

Blair went on to play with the band through its first four albums, Tom Petty and the Heartbreakers, You're Gonna Get It!, Damn the Torpedoes and Hard Promises. In the last couple of years of his first stint with the band, Blair was considering leaving and was not always available. Thus, he occasionally replaced with other bassists, including Donald "Duck" Dunn, on his last two albums. In spite of his departure in 1982, he would continue to make occasional guest appearances on studio albums all the way up to Southern Accents.

He rejoined the Heartbreakers on March 18, 2002, to perform at the band's Rock and Roll Hall of Fame induction ceremony. The reunion led to Blair's return to the group for its 2002 summer tour. He helped finish The Last DJ album and was present for all subsequent albums and tours following the death of his replacement Howie Epstein.

Aside from the Heartbreakers, Blair has designed album covers for Barbara Morrison and Carlos Zialcita. He has also played on albums by Kirstin Candy, Stevie Nicks, Del Shannon, Slobberbone and The Tremblers. Blair was also part of the original lineup of The Dirty Knobs, Mike Campbell's side-project band as well as Campbell's band the Blue Stingrays recording the album Surf-N-Burn in 1997.

Tom Petty said this about Blair: "It's great having him [back] in the band. It reminds me of the old days just seeing him around. ... We hung out. We knew each other. And he was always the best bass player in town."

Blair has been seen with many basses (including a Rickenbacker 4001 and a Höfner Club bass, both owned by Petty), but is best known for playing Fender Jazz Basses, having used a black Jazz Bass in his early years with the Heartbreakers and a white Jazz Bass since his return to the band. His bass rig in the early days of the Heartbreakers was a Vox Super Beatle. When he returned to the band in 2002, and for the tours in 2002 and 2003, Blair was seen using a blond piggyback Fender Bassman amplifier. Since 2005, Blair's bass rig is a modern Ampeg SVT. In the 2010s, Blair was the producer behind two records by California band L.A. Edwards, including Blessings from Home Vol 1.
