= Special (The Temptations album) =

Studio album by The Temptations
- Released: August 16, 1989
- Recorded: 1988
- Studio: Alpha Studios and Encore Studios (Burbank, California); Ameraycan Studios and Pacifique Studios (North Hollywood, California); United Western Recorders and Studio Masters (Hollywood, California); Bossa Nova Hotel (San Fernando, California); Ground Control Studios (Santa Monica, California); Signa Sound (San Diego, California); Super Disc Inc. (Detroit, Michigan)
- Genre: Soul
- Length: 48:55
- Language: English
- Label: Motown
- Producer: Keith Andes; Larry Hatcher; Dick Rudolph; Michael Sembello; Stan Sheppard; Jimmy Varner

The Temptations chronology
Together Again (1987)	Special (1989)	Milestone (1991)

Special is a 1989 studio album from American soul group The Temptations. The album marks the return of Ali-Ollie Woodson as the group's lead singer following Dennis Edwards’ third and final departure.

== Reception ==
Editors at AllMusic Guide scored this album three out of five stars, with reviewer Jason Elias characterizing it as "business-as-usual, mid- to late-'80s Temptations release" but writing that this is not a bad thing.

== Track listing ==
Side one
No.	Title	Writer(s)	Lead singer(s)	Length
1.	"Friends"	Keith Andes, Larry Hatcher, and Chris Jones	Melvin Franklin (spoken word), Ron Tyson, Richard Street, Ali-Ollie Woodson	4:52
2.	"Special"	Stan Sheppard and Jimmy Varner	Woodson	4:30
3.	"All I Want from You"	Stan Sheppard and Aaron Smith	Woodson, Franklin, Tyson, Otis Williams, Street	5:33
4.	"She's Better Than Money"	Andes and Hatcher	Woodson, Franklin	4:28
5.	"One Step at a Time"	Ron Tyson and Dennis Williams	Woodson, WIlliams (spoken word)	5:11

Side two
No.	Title	Writer(s)	Lead singer(s)	Length
1.	"Fill Me Up"	Andes and Hatcher	Woodson	4:18
2.	"Go AHead"	Andes, Hatcher, C. Jones, and Glenn Jones	Williams (spoken word), Woodson, Street	6:36
3.	"Loveline"	Brian O'Doherty	Woodson	3:38
4.	"Soul to Soul"	O'Doherty	Woodson, Tyson	5:17

Bonus track on CD Edition

No.	Title	Writer(s)	Lead singer(s)	Length
10.	"O.A.O. Lover"	Williams, Woodson	Woodson	4:59

== Personnel ==
The Temptations

- Melvin Franklin – bass vocals
- Richard Street – second tenor vocals
- Ron Tyson – tenor and falsetto vocals
- Otis Williams – baritone vocals
- Ali-Ollie Woodson – lead vocals, programming (10), arrangements (10)

Musicians

- Keith Andes – keyboards (1), drums (1, 7), rhythm and vocal arrangements (1, 4, 6, 7), all other instruments (4, 6, 7), bass (7)
- Johnny Davis – keyboards (1)
- Larry Hatcher – keyboards (1), drums (1), rhythm and vocal arrangements (1, 4, 6, 7) all other instruments (4, 6, 7), bass (4)
- Jimmy Varner – keyboards (2, 5), drum programming (2, 5), rhythm and vocal arrangements (2, 5)
- Kenneth Crouch – keyboards (3)
- Aaron Smith – keyboards (3), synthesizer programming (3), drum programming (3), rhythm and vocal arrangements (3)
- Brian O'Doherty – programming (8, 9), arrangements (8, 9), rhythm and vocal arrangements (9)
- Michael Sembello – programming (8), arrangements (8)
- Frank LaRosa – programming (9, 10), arrangements (9, 10), rhythm arrangements (9)
- Mike Campbell – guitars (1, 4, 6, 7)
- Charles Fearing – guitars (2, 3, 5)
- Paul Jackson, Jr. – guitars (3)
- Freddie Washington – bass (2, 5)
- Paulinho da Costa – percussion (2, 3, 5)
- Gerald Albright – saxophone (2, 3)
- David Crawford – flute (5)
- Maceo Parker – saxophone solo (7)
- Stan Sheppard – vocal arrangements (2, 5), rhythm arrangements (5)
- Chris Jones – vocal arrangements (6)

Production and Technical

- Debbie Sandridge – executive producer
- Keith Andes – producer (1, 4, 6, 7)
- Larry Hatcher – producer (1, 4, 6, 7)
- Stan Sheppard – producer (2, 3, 5)
- Jimmy Varner – producer (2, 5)
- Dick Rudolph – producer (8–10)
- Michael Sembello – producer (8–10)
- Eric Camp – recording (1)
- Gary Dobbins – recording (1–7), mixing (1, 3, 4, 6, 7)
- Pat Karamian – recording (1, 6)
- Randy Long – recording (1, 6)
- Jim Michewicz – recording (1, 4, 6)
- Barney Perkins – mixing (2, 5)
- Tony Jackson – recording (6, 7)
- Frank La Rosa – recording (8–10), mixing (8–10)
- Bud Rizzo – recording (8–10), mixing (8–10)
- Hilary Bercovici – mixing (9)
- Joey Schwartz – recording assistant (9, 10)
- Chris Bellman – mastering at Bernie Grundman Mastering (Hollywood, California)
- Gayle Woodard – production coordination
- Jeff Adamoff – art direction
- Bacon / O'Brien – design
- Todd Gray – photography
- Shelly Berger – management
- Billie Bullock – management

== Chart performance ==
Special spent 44 weeks on the Billboard Top R&B/Hip Hop Albums chart, reaching up to 25 on October 28, 1989.

== See also ==
- List of 1989 albums
