= The Dunwells =

English rock band

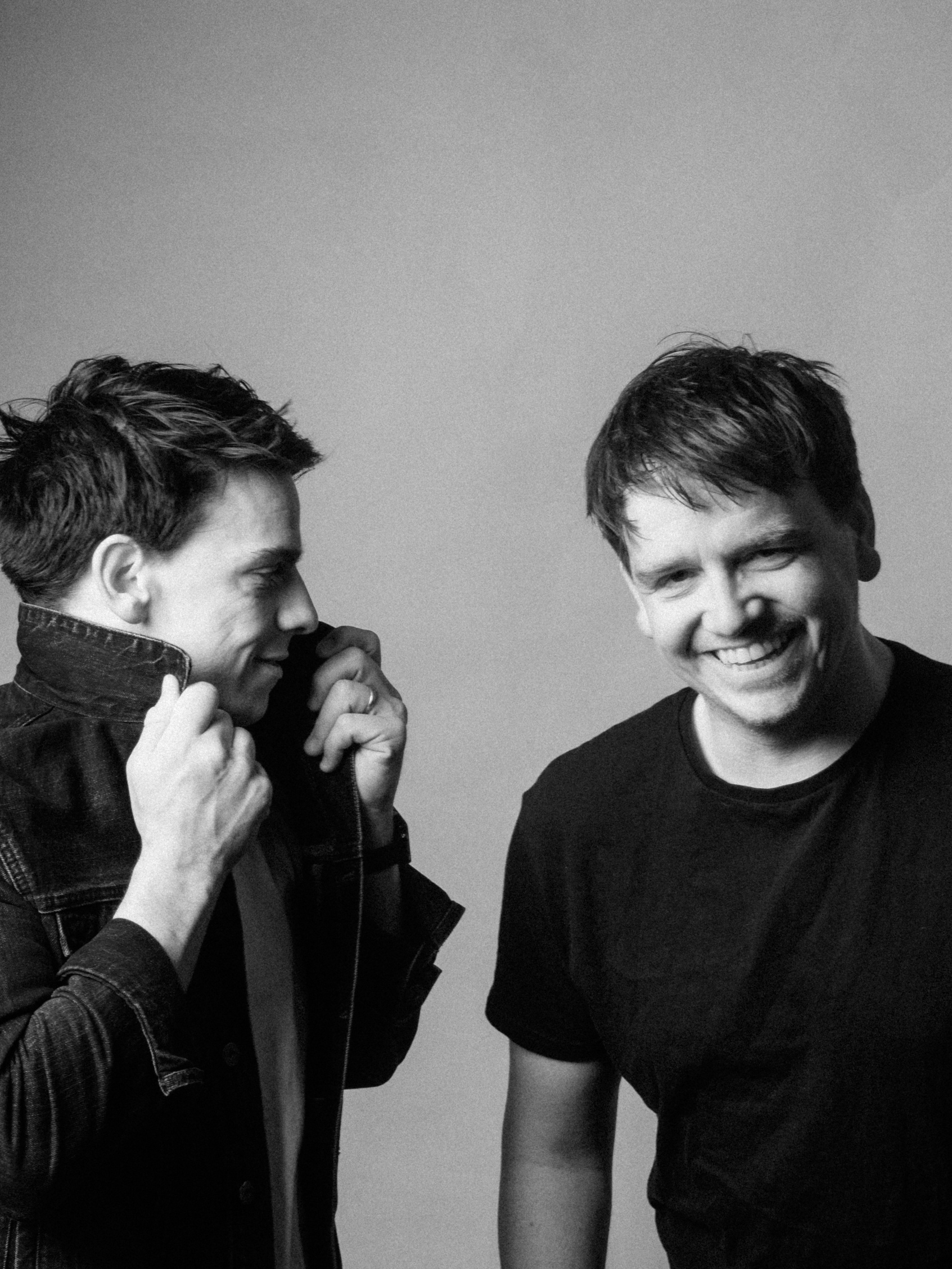

Background information
- Origin: Pudsey, Leeds, England
- Genres: Folk; Indie folk; Americana
- Years active: 2009–present
- Labels: Playing In Traffic Records, Concord Music Group
- Publisher: Universal Music Publishing (Syco)
- Members: David Dunwell; Joseph Dunwell; Rob Clayton; Ben Freer; Chris Quick
- Past members: Jonny Lamb; Dave Hanson; Lee Dawson; Adam Taylor
- Website: thedunwells.com

The Dunwells are an English Indie folk, Americana band formed in Leeds in 2009. Brothers Joseph and David Dunwell divide their time between their home studio, Mill Lane, and touring the UK and overseas.

The band was signed by Playing In Traffic Records in 2011. Their debut album, Blind Sighted Faith, produced by John Porter, was released in February 2012. In June 2012, Playing In Traffic struck a deal with Concord Music Group, and the band re-released Blind Sighted Faith through Concord in August 2012.

This was followed by the release of Show Me Emotion EP in September 2014. In 2015 came the Lucky Ones EP, whose title track was its first single; it was released on 25 May via Concord Music Group. Both EPs were produced by Stephen Harris.

In February 2016 the band released Light Up The Sky, their second album with Concord Music Group

. In

2017 the band began releasing music independently, starting with the EP ‘Colour My Mind’

. Between

2018 and 2025 the band self-released two full- length studio albums, Something In The Water and Tell Me What You Want, and two further EPs, Make It Beautiful and One Day At A Time.

In

2026, Nineties Kid, the first single from the forthcoming fifth studio album, was released on 29 October, with a follow- up due later in the year.

== History ==
=== Early years (2009–2011) ===
The band members started out playing pubs separately in Leeds, England. The two brothers, Joseph and David Dunwell, had been performing as solo acts throughout Yorkshire. The Dunwell brothers recruited childhood friend Jonny Lamb (drums), along with local musicians Dave Hanson (lead guitar) and Lee Dawson (bass). When a booking agent heard them play an open mic together, she insisted on booking them a show as a group. In October 2009, record producer Dave Creffield formalized their band status by recording them. Rob Clayton, Jonny Lamb's cousin, replaced Dawson on bass in 2011 after Dawson left the band. Joseph and David Dunwell and Rob Clayton all attended St. Mary's Catholic High School, Menston.

The Dunwells recorded live at ITV Studios in 2009 and performed on BBC Radio Leeds during the same year. In March 2010, the band released their self-funded debut single "Elizabeth", which reached number 31 on the UK Indie Chart. Continuing with that momentum, the band was featured as Caffe Nero's "Artist of the Month" in November 2010.

=== Blind Sighted Faith (2011–2012) ===
English singer-songwriter Tony Moore spotted the band while they were performing at The Bedford in London. Moore invited the group to perform at the 2011 Folk Alliance International in Memphis, Tennessee. Shortly after their U.S. performance, The Dunwells signed with the Austin, Texas- based label Playing In Traffic Records in May 2011. On 10 February 2012, at Manchester's Ritz, they were named HMV's Next Big Thing of 2012. Four days later, on 14 February 2012, The Dunwells released their debut album, Blind Sighted Faith. The album was recorded at Willie Nelson's Pedernales studio with producer John Porter. Following the release, in March, The Dunwells played at several venues and festivals, including opening for Mumford & Sons and playing South by Southwest. In June 2012, Playing In Traffic Records struck a joint venture for The Dunwells with Concord Music Group.

The band then enlisted the help of George Drakoulias, who recorded and produced the band's next single, "So Beautiful". Playing In Traffic Records in conjunction with Concord Music Group re-released Blind Sighted Faith on 28 August 2012 with the addition of "So Beautiful". Following the re-release of Blind Sighted Faith, the band made their US Network Television debut in August 2012, performing their song "Follow The Road" on NBC's The Tonight Show with Jay Leno. The band ended 2012 with performances at Lollapalooza, Austin City Limits, and Red Rocks.

=== Follow the Road (2013–2014) ===
The Dunwells took a break at the beginning of 2013 and then returned to the road in the spring, traveling to Austin, Texas for SXSW and then continuing on to do shows along the west coast. The band returned to the UK and released their second album, Follow the Road, in May 2013. Although the band was from the UK, this was their first album release in the United Kingdom. Follow the Road incorporated many of the same songs as Blind Sighted Faith, but it was completely resequenced and included a variety of remixes and alternate versions geared towards their British audience. The album included remixes by Tim Palmer (Pearl Jam, Robert Plant, Jason Mraz) and Jamie Candilorio. Following the UK release, the band returned to the United States for their Follow the Road summer tour. They played several festivals in Canada and the United States, including Bunbury Music Festival, Winnipeg Folk Festival, and Lollapalooza, along with a variety of venues throughout the United States. While on tour the band performed at iHeartRadio studios in New York City. Following their summer tour and return to the UK, lead guitarist Dave Hanson left the band to pursue a solo career. The band continued as a four-piece. They spent the remainder of 2013 recording their second album.

=== Show Me Emotion EP and Lucky Ones (2014–2015) ===
After spending the remainder of 2013 in the studio, The Dunwells returned in late January, making an appearance on The Andrew Marr Show on BBC1, performing their song "I Could Be A King". The band hit the road in April 2014 on their 'Light Up the Sky' tour. The tour spanned across the United Kingdom hitting all the major stops along the way. In conjunction with the 'Light Up the Sky' tour, the band released their first single, "Sleepless Nights", from their EP, Show Me Emotion. At the conclusion of the tour, The Dunwells returned to the United States to play a short run of shows centred around their performance at Bonnaroo Music and Arts Festival. After the U.S. shows, Jonny Lamb left the band to take care of his newborn son. Upon their return to the UK, the band replaced Lamb on drums with Adam Taylor, who had filled in for the band on previous occasions. The Dunwells began a run of English festivals in July 2014, playing Hop Farm Festival, Tramlines Festival and Cornbury Music Festival, among others.

On 9 September 2014, the band released a four-song EP entitled Show Me Emotion, produced by Stephen Harris (Kodaline, Kaiser Chiefs, The Wombats), with the title track being the first single. The single, "Show Me Emotion" received widespread regional radio play in the UK, as well as spins on national mediums, such as BBC Radio 6 Music. The Scunthorpe Telegraph said "the title track has echoes of Elbow but it should establish The Dunwells as chart stars." Following the release of Show Me Emotion, the band made multiple appearances on English television and radio, including BBC Look North TV, BBC Leeds and BBC Manchester. The band also played a run of shows on the western coast of the United States after the release, selling out multiple venues.

The Dunwells toured the UK in February 2015, selling out several venues and debuting their new single, "Lucky Ones". The band released their second EP, entitled Lucky Ones, on 25 May via Concord Music Group.

=== Light Up The Sky (2016) ===
On 26 February 2016, the band released their second studio album, Light Up the Sky before embarking on their first European tour.

In the UK, the album was premiered by The Daily Telegraph, which said "The album is a blend of electro-infused, indie music" and "their most intimate and epic yet".

Talking about the album, Joe Dunwell said "This is an album full of heart felt lyrics and powerful melodies, it's an album of hope, struggles with everyday life, sadness, happiness, honesty, the desire for more. It's about being a human being with the same emotions as everyone else." David Dunwell said of the album "It's a very honest record. It talks about where we are in life, how frustrated we sometimes are, but also our happiness, some occasional sadness, and the good foundations of our home lives. It's also about how much we want this, the sacrifices we've made, how ready we are".

=== Live Shows, Studio Releases and Songwriting (2017–Present) ===
Independently released singles, including "All Time High", " Colour My Mind" and " We Made Fire in The Pouring Rain", were written and recorded while the brothers toured in places such as London, Nashville, New York and Glasgow. The brothers then produced and independently released their third studio album, ‘Something in the Water’, in 2019. This was followed by stadium shows with Tom Jones, a six-week tour of the UK and Ireland with Scouting for Girls, touring in Europe with Pete Murray, and festival appearances at SXSW, The Great Escape, Never World and Camper Calling. In the following years, The Dunwells balanced time in the studio, on the road and in the community. Working both independently and with or for other artists, they co-wrote a top 5 album with Lucy Spraggan and new work with Pete Murray and Since September, and released a 20 track live album in mid 2021. The band also increased their work in sync licensing, with placements on Netflix, NBC, ITV, BBC and the Commonwealth Games, and received corporate commissions from Hobbycraft and the Bank of Queensland. Their work continued through the pandemic years with 265 live streams. Their 4th studio album, ’Tell Me What You Want.’, was launched at The Crypt St Martin in the fields, London, and released in May 2022. One review described it: “Tell Me What You Want.’ is not only a flawless collection of songs but is also their best work to date.” The album featured heavily during an interrupted festival season, and the band promoted it with a 20- date tour across the UK in the autumn. Other activities that year included serving as Café Nero's artist in residence, writing and production for Lucy May Walker and JENNA, songs featured on ITV, and the inaugural Dunwells Summertime Festival.

In

2023 the band played more live shows than in previous years and launched a new studio. They toured the UK in spring and autumn and played 20 festival dates, including first appearances at Between the Trees Festival, British Country Music Fest and Black Deer Festival. That year they returned to the US for the first time since 2018, following an invitation from Sonic Guild to join songwriters from around the world at Sonic Ranch Studios in El Paso. While there, they played shows in Austin, Los Angeles, New York and Connecticut.

While in Austin, they performed on Kill Tony at Joe Rogan's venue The Mothership. The trip concluded with a meeting with Universal Syco about future opportunities. In spring 2023 the brothers launched their studio, Aire Street Recording, where they write and produce for themselves and for local, national and international artists. Through ‘Aire Street on the Road’, they deliver monthly masterclasses to students.

In 2024, the Dunwell brothers relocated their recording studio from Aire Street to Mill Lane, hosted their first songwriters' retreat in the South of France, toured the UK in spring and autumn, played the festival season, and ended the year with a songwriting tour in the US. They also continue to run student masterclasses in Yorkshire and the North of England and work with their charity partner, TempusNovo.

In 2024 the band signed a publishing deal with Syco/Universal Music Publishing, which has led to their music being featured on television shows in the UK and US. Their Mill Lane Studio, in Spence Mills, Bramley, was offered as a recording prize at the 2025 Aesthetica Short Film Festival. The single "I Feel You" was released in March 2025. The band toured the UK in spring and autumn 2025, including a sold-out run of Scottish dates, and supported Scouting for Girls at Liverpool Cathedral in August 2025. The band also run songwriting masterclasses for schools.

In

2026 the band toured extensively; a spring headline tour was followed by two tours sharing stages with Lucy Spraggan and Scouting For Girls, and then a run of sold- out shows across the UK. At the upgraded Mill Lane, Joseph and David have continued writing and producing with and for other artists, companies and the local community. Their fifth studio album is scheduled for release in early 2027. Nineties Kid, the first single from the album, was released in October, and a headline show in their home town is scheduled for December.

== Musical style ==
The Dunwells' sound has been described as indie folk and Americana, featuring vocal harmonies and personal lyrics. Over time, the band's music has also drawn on influences from both newer and older artists.

== Band members ==
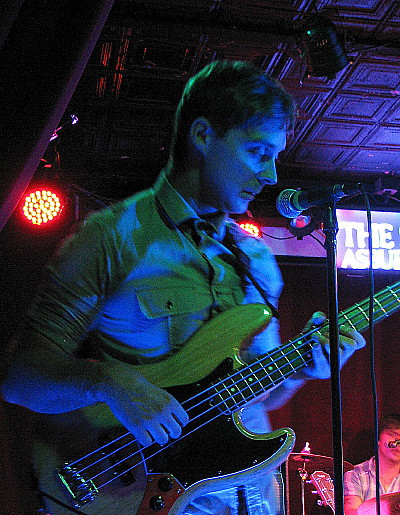
Rob Clayton at The Saint in Asbury Park, New Jersey, July 2013

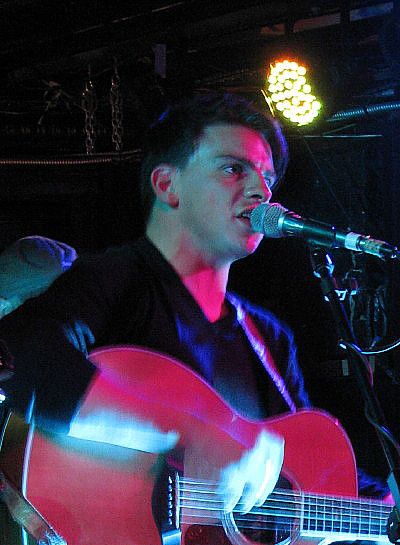
Joseph Dunwell at The Saint in Asbury Park, New Jersey, July 2013

- Joseph Dunwell – vocals, acoustic guitar (2009–present)
- David Dunwell – vocals, piano, guitars, banjo (2009–present)
- Rob Clayton – bass, vocals (2011–present)
- Ben Freer – drums (2019–Present)
- Chris Quick - Keys, Guitar (2022–Present)

== Former members ==
- Lee Dawson – bass, vocals (2009–2011)
- Dave Hanson – lead guitar, vocals, pedal steel (2009–2013)
- Jonny Lamb – drums, vocals (2009–2014)
- Adam Taylor – vocals, drums (2014–2016)

== Discography ==
=== Studio albums ===
- Blind Sighted Faith (2012) (Playing In Traffic Records/Concord Music Group)
- Light Up the Sky (2016) (Modal Music Limited/Concord Music Group)
- Something In the Water (2019) (BrothersArmour)
- Live at Aire Street (2020) (BrothersArmour)
- Tell Me What You Want (2022) (BrothersArmour)

=== Compilation albums ===
- Follow the Road (2013) (Playing In Traffic Records/Concord Music Group)

=== EPs ===
- Leaving the Rose EP (2012) (UK Exclusive)- Playing In Traffic
- Show Me Emotion EP (September 2014)- Playing In Traffic/Concord
- Lucky Ones EP (May 2015)- Playing In Traffic/Concord
- Colour My Mind (2017) (BrothersArmour)
- Make it Beautiful (2023) (BrothersArmour)
- One Day at a Time (2024) (BrothersArmour)

== See also ==
- List of bands originating in Leeds
