= Scrapbook (Portastatic EP) =

Scrapbook EP

EP by Portastatic
- Released: 1995
- Genre: Indie rock
- Label: Merge (MRG080)

Professional ratings
Review scores
Source	Rating
AllMusic	3/5 stars
MusicHound Rock: The Essential Album Guide	3/5 stars

Scrapbook EP is a double 7-inch single and CD EP by the band Portastatic. It was released on the Merge Records label in 1995.

"St. Elmo's Fire" is a Brian Eno cover. "Why Pinch Yourself" and "A Bear That Chokes" were previously released on Hello CD of the Month EP.

Yo La Tengo appears on the EP.

== Critical reception ==
AllMusic wrote that the EP "is the sort of work that sets a blueprint for things to come ... the record is fantastic in every respect." Spin called the version of "St. Elmo's Fire" a "stunner ... which sounds like a '70s country-rock tune piped into a truckstop diner in cyberspace."

== Track listing ==
Double 7":

Side A:

1. "St. Elmo's Fire"

Side B:

1. "Why Pinch Yourself"

Side C:

1. "A Bear That Chokes"

Side D:

1. "My Favourite Sound"

CD EP:

1. "St. Elmo's Fire"
2. "Why Pinch Yourself"
3. "A Bear That Chokes"
4. "My Favourite Sound"

== Personnel ==
- Mac McCaughan
- Georgia Hubley "St. Elmo's Fire"
- Ira Kaplan "St. Elmo's Fire"
