= Blue Stingrays =

US musical group

The Blue Stingrays were a late 1990s rock band that played surf rock, incorporating some country and western elements, with an overall Hawaiian atmosphere.

The band was composed of the members of the Heartbreakers, Tom Petty's band. During a short break from their work with Petty they recorded one album, Surf-n-Burn, which included a cover of the theme song "Goldfinger" from the James Bond film of the same name. Released by Epitone Records, the album's liner notes include a faux history of The Blue Stingrays as if they were a legendary instrumental band founded in the late 1950s whose original albums were lost for decades due to the band members desire for anonymity. It was a reunion of sorts, with founding bassist Ron Blair playing with Heartbreakers members for the first time in 15 years, and Randall Marsh drumming, who was in a previous incarnation of the Heartbreakers called Mudcrutch.

== Personnel ==
Though not credited in the CD booklet, the musicians were:

- Mike Campbell, guitar
- Ron Blair, bass guitar
- Randall Marsh, drums

== Discography ==
Albums:

- Surf-n-Burn LP (by Epitone/Epitaph) 1997
