= Blind Sighted Faith =

2012 studio album by the Dunwells

Studio album by The Dunwells
- Released: 14 February 2012; 28 August 2012 (re-release date)
- Studio: Pedernales Recording (Spicewood, Texas); Analogue Studios (West Yorkshire, UK)
- Genre: Rock, Folk rock, Americana
- Label: Playing In Traffic, Concord Music Group
- Producer: John Porter, George Drakoulias

Blind Sighted Faith is the debut album by English folk-rock band The Dunwells. The album was released on 14 February 2012 on Playing In Traffic Records. Playing In Traffic Records, in conjunction with Concord Music Group, plans to re-release the album on 28 August 2012 with the addition of the new single "So Beautiful."

== Overview ==
Blind Sighted Faith is an 11-track collection produced by nine-time Grammy winner John Porter (The Smiths, Elvis Costello, Ryan Adams). After signing with the Austin, Texas based label Playing In Traffic Records in May 2011, The Dunwells recorded Blind Sighted Faith during the summer of 2011 at Willie Nelson’s Pedernales Recording Studio in Spicewood, Texas, and Analogue Studios in West Yorkshire, England. Blind Sighted Faith introduced The Dunwells' organic blend of acoustic and electric roots music complete with five-part harmonies. In late June 2012, Playing In Traffic Records struck a joint venture for The Dunwells with Concord Music Group, enlisting the help of the record producer, George Drakoulias to record the band's single "So Beautiful." Playing In Traffic Records and Concord Music Group re-released Blind Sighted Faith with the addition of "So Beautiful" on 28 August 2012.

According to lead singer Joseph Dunwell, the title song for the album, "was written at a time in our career when we were broke, when all we had was our music and our faith. But the song became a turning point, as we were suddenly offered our first UK tour, and then invited to perform at the Folk Alliance Conference in Memphis, Tennessee. We didn’t have the money to go to America, but, trusting in ourselves and in our music, we closed our eyes, pushed the button, and booked the flights. There were 5,000 incredible musicians there, yet they chose us as the ‘break-out band.’ Titling the album Blind Sighted Faith was quite a poignant statement".

== 2012 track listing ==
1. "I Could Be a King"—3:43
2. "Blindsighted Faith"—4:17
3. "Hand That Feeds"—3:42
4. "Only Me"—4:03
5. "Elizabeth"—4:26
6. "Follow The Road"—3:29
7. "In The Moment"—4:06
8. "Goodnight My City"—3:37
9. "I Want To Be"—3:11
10. "Perfect Timing"—4:02
11. "Oh Lord"—6:15

== 2012 re-release track listing ==
1. "I Could Be A King"—3:43
2. "Blind Sighted Faith"—4:17
3. "So Beautiful"—3:50
4. "Only Me"—4:03
5. "Elizabeth"—4:26
6. "Follow The Road"—3:29
7. "Borrow Me"—4:39
8. "Goodnight My City"—3:37
9. "Hand That Feeds"—3:42
10. "Dance With Me"—3:06
11. "Oh Lord"—6:15
