= Mike Campbell (musician) =

American guitarist (born 1950)

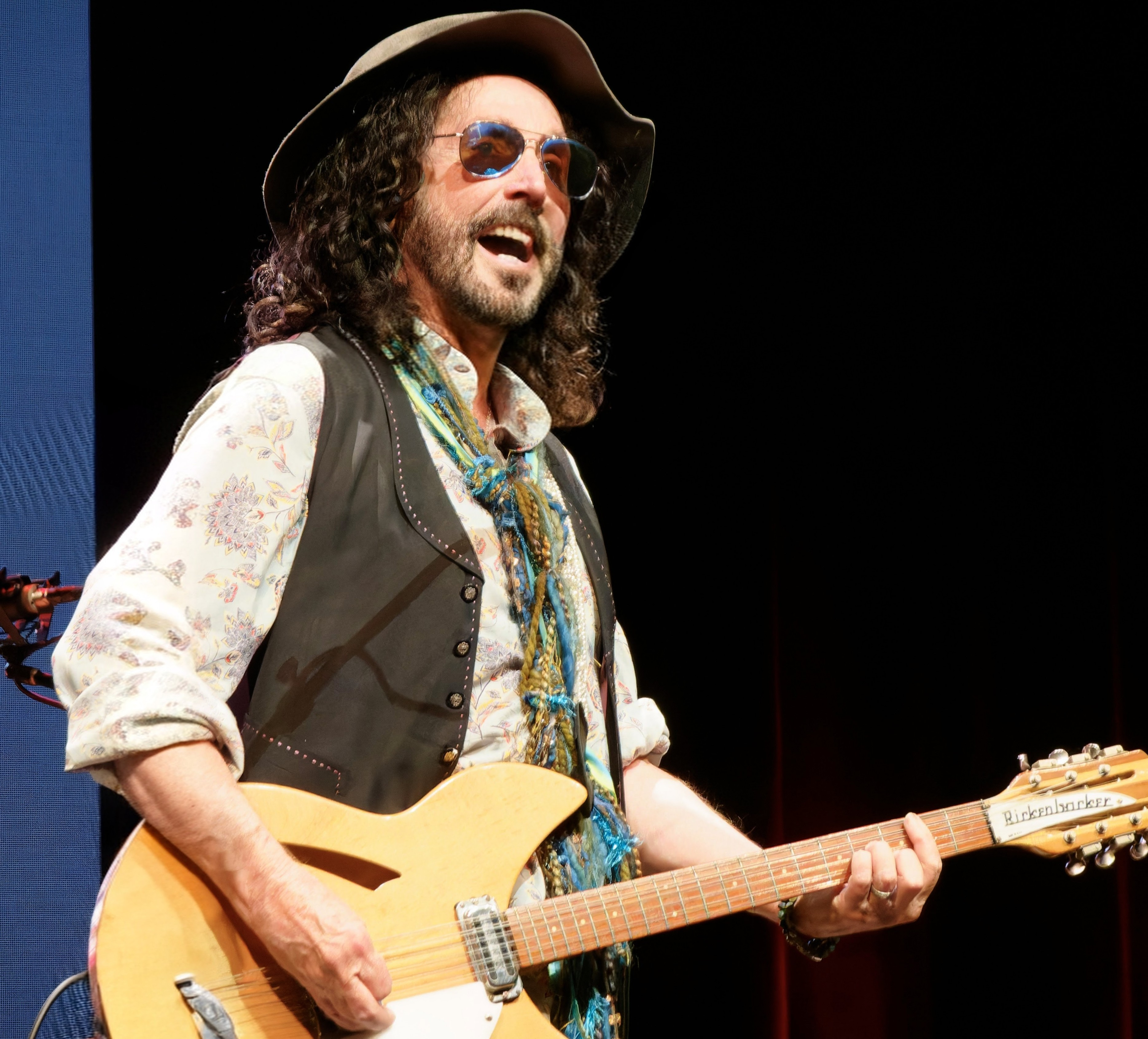
- Campbell performing in 2025

Background information
- Born: Michael Wayne Campbell; February 1, 1950 (age 76); Panama City, Florida, U.S.
- Origin: Jacksonville, Florida, U.S.
- Genre: Rock
- Occupation: Guitarist
- Instruments: Guitar; vocals
- Years active: 1971–present
- Member of: The Dirty Knobs
- Formerly of: Mudcrutch; Tom Petty and the Heartbreakers; Blue Stingrays; Fleetwood Mac

Michael Wayne Campbell (born February 1, 1950) is an American guitarist and vocalist. He was a member of Tom Petty and the Heartbreakers and co-wrote many of the band's hits with Petty, including "Refugee", "Here Comes My Girl", "You Got Lucky", and "Runnin' Down a Dream". Outside of The Heartbreakers, he has worked as a session guitarist and songwriter with a number of other acts, including composing and playing on the Don Henley hits "The Boys of Summer" and "The Heart of the Matter" as well as working on most of Stevie Nicks's solo albums. Campbell, along with Neil Finn, joined Fleetwood Mac to replace lead guitarist Lindsey Buckingham on their world tour in 2018–2019. After the end of that tour, he has been performing with his own band, the Dirty Knobs. As of 2024, the Dirty Knobs have released three albums.

On November 11, 2011, Rolling Stone magazine named Campbell in their list of the top 100 guitarists, placing him at number 79. He was inducted into the Rock and Roll Hall of Fame in 2002 as a member of Tom Petty and the Heartbreakers.

== Early years ==
Campbell was born on February 1, 1950, in Panama City, Florida. He grew up there and in Jacksonville, Florida, where he graduated from Jean Ribault High School in 1968. When he was 16, his mother, Helen Barber, bought him his first guitar, a Harmony acoustic model which he later described as "unplayable", from a pawnshop. Campbell's first electric guitar was a $60 Guyatone; however, playing a friend's Gibson SG (a model which Campbell would not own himself for many years) was a transformative experience for him. Like Tom Petty, Campbell drew his strongest influences from The Byrds and Bob Dylan with additional inspiration coming from guitarists such as Scotty Moore, Luther Perkins, George Harrison, Carl Wilson, Jerry Garcia, Roger McGuinn, Keith Richards, Brian Jones, Jimmy Page, Mick Taylor and Neil Young. The first song he learned to play was "Baby Let Me Follow You Down", a song which appeared on Dylan's eponymous debut album. He formed a band named Dead or Alive which quickly disbanded.

Campbell met Tom Petty through drummer Randall Marsh. Marsh was auditioning to be in Petty's band Mudcrutch and learned that Mudcrutch had recently lost their guitarist. He suggested that Petty try Campbell, who was his roommate and had actually been listening to the conversation in the next room. Campbell impressed Petty with his version of "Johnny B. Goode" and was offered a spot in the band. Mudcrutch became a popular act around Gainesville and north Florida in the early 1970s. They relocated to Los Angeles in 1974 and signed a record deal with Shelter Records but released only one poor-selling single and broke up soon after.

== Tom Petty and the Heartbreakers ==
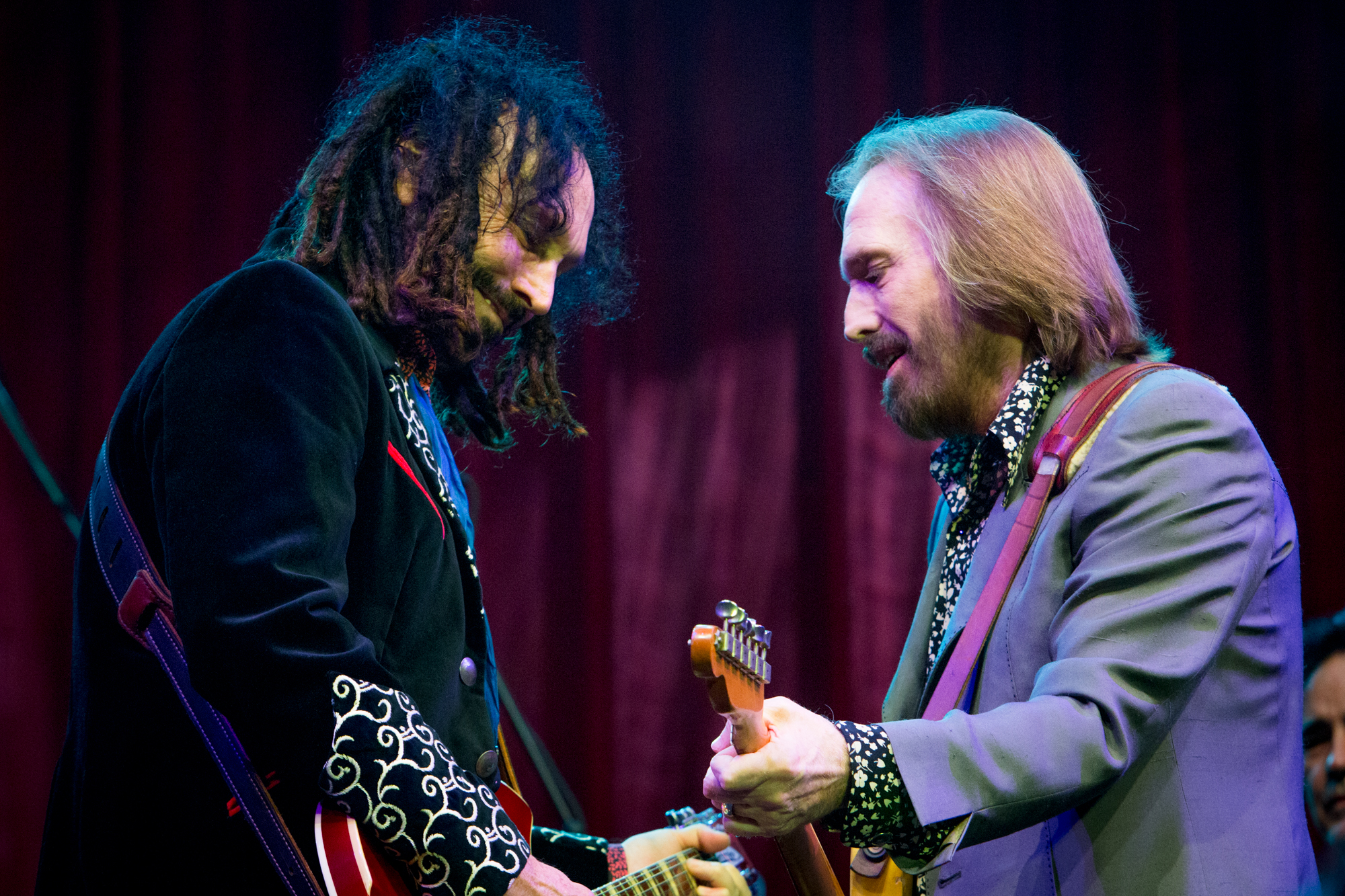
Campbell performing with Tom Petty at the Bonnaroo Music Festival in 2013

In 1976, Campbell rejoined Petty to begin Tom Petty and the Heartbreakers with former Mudcrutch member Benmont Tench (keyboards) along with Ron Blair (bass guitar) and Stan Lynch (drums).

Like the other Heartbreakers, Campbell avoids the virtuoso approach to playing, preferring to have his work serve the needs of each song.

Campbell co-produced the Heartbreakers albums Southern Accents, Pack Up the Plantation: Live!, Let Me Up (I've Had Enough), Into the Great Wide Open, Songs and Music from "She's the One", Echo, The Last DJ, The Live Anthology and Mojo as well as the Petty solo albums Full Moon Fever, Wildflowers and Highway Companion. His sole vocal contribution to the group was on the track "I Don't Wanna Fight" on Echo.

Campbell collaborated, recorded and toured with Tom Petty for almost 50 years. His last live performance with the Heartbreakers took place on September 25, 2017 at the Hollywood Bowl in Los Angeles. Tom Petty died unexpectedly about one week later on October 2.

== Side projects ==
In 1997, Campbell co-founded the Blue Stingrays with Heartbreakers member Ron Blair and Mudcrutch member Randall Marsh, releasing their one album the same year.

In 2007, he joined a reformed Mudcrutch with Petty, Tench, Marsh and Tom Leadon: they debuted in 2008 with a tour and an album. The band returned in 2016 for another album and tour before Petty's death.

On April 9, 2018, Fleetwood Mac announced that Campbell would be joining the band along with Neil Finn to replace lead guitarist Lindsey Buckingham for their 2018–19 world tour. In March 2022, Campbell announced he had not worked with Fleetwood Mac after 2019 and that he had moved on.

On March 18, 2025, Campbell's book / audiobook, "Heartbreaker: A Memoir" was published.

== The Dirty Knobs ==
While in the Heartbreakers, Campbell was lead singer and guitarist with a side band, the Dirty Knobs, with guitarist Jason Sinay, drummer Matt Laug, and bassist Lance Morrison. "It's rougher-edged [than Petty's material]," Campbell says of the group, "It's slightly over-driven, less polished, lots of Sixties influence: The Kinks, Led Zeppelin, The Animals. It's something I probably should have done a long time ago, but I didn't 'cause I was wrapped up in the Heartbreakers." They released a single, "Feelin' High", in 2010. Jason Sinay left the band in 2022 to focus on his solo career. His replacement is Texas guitarist Chris Holt, who has played with Don Henley, Max Weinberg, and the Eagles.

The band released the title track from its debut album, Wreckless Abandon, in January 2020, followed by the album itself in November of that year. The album was produced by Campbell and George Drakoulias, who with Tom Petty produced Tom Petty and the Heartbreakers' The Last DJ. The cover art was by Klaus Voormann, who designed the cover of the Beatles' Revolver.

In the summer of 2021, the band released a new single, a cover of J. J. Cale's "Humdinger".

In April 2022, the band released their second album, External Combustion.

In 2023, Matt Laug became the touring drummer for AC/DC so former Heartbreaker, Steve Ferrone, was brought in on drums.

On May 7, 2024, the band released a new song and video, "Dare to Dream" from their third album, Vagabonds, Virgins & Misfits, released on June 14, 2024.

On June 12, 2026, Mike Campbell & the Dirty Knobs released their fourth album, Mission of Mercy, preceded by its singles, "I Remember" (released April 13) and "No Regrets" (May 12).

== Discography ==
=== As primary artist ===
==== Solo ====
- Unbroken Wing (2022) from various artist's album For the Birds, on which he plays a dulcimer given to him by Stevie Nicks while supporting her on tour.

With Blue Stingrays

- Surf-n-Burn (1997)

With The Dirty Knobs

Albums

- Wreckless Abandon (2020)
- External Combustion (2022)
- Vagabonds, Virgins & Misfits (2024)
- Mission of Mercy (2026)

Singles

- Feelin' High (2010)
- Humdinger (2021)
- Heart of the Heartland (2025)
- I Remember (2026)

=== As sideman ===
With Bonnie Koloc

- Close-Up (Epic Records, 1976)

With Stevie Nicks

- Bella Donna (Atco Records, 1981)
- The Wild Heart (Modern Records, 1983)
- Rock a Little (Modern Records, 1985)
- The Other Side of the Mirror (Modern Records, 1989)
- Street Angel (Modern Records, 1994)
- Trouble in Shangri-La (Reprise Records, 2001)
- In Your Dreams (Reprise Records, 2011)
- 24 Karat Gold: Songs from the Vault (Reprise Records, 2014)

With The Spinners

- Labor of Love (Atlantic, 1981)

With Dwight Twilley

- Jungle (EMI, 1984)

With Don Henley

- Building the Perfect Beast (Geffen, 1984)
- The End of the Innocence (Geffen, 1989)
- Inside Job (Warner Bros. Records, 2000)

With Lone Justice

- Lone Justice (Geffen, 1985)

With Eurythmics

- Be Yourself Tonight (RCA Records, 1985)

With Bob Dylan

- Empire Burlesque (Columbia Records, 1985)
- Knocked Out Loaded (Columbia Records, 1986)
- Together Through Life (Columbia Records, 2009)

With Aretha Franklin

- Who's Zoomin' Who? (Arista Records, 1985)

With Melba Moore

- A Lot of Love (Capitol Records, 1986)

With Peter Case

- Peter Case (Geffen, 1986)

With Brian Setzer

- The Knife Feels Like Justice (EMI, 1986)

With Tramaine Hawkins

- The Search Is Over (A&M, 1986)

With Matthew Sweet

- Inside (Sony Music, 1986)

With Stephanie Mills

- If I Were Your Woman (MCA Records, 1987)

With Warren Zevon

- Sentimental Hygiene (Virgin Records, 1987)
- Transverse City (Virgin Records, 1989)
- The Wind (Artemis Records, 2003)

With Williams Brothers

- Two Stories (Warner Bros. Records, 1987)

With Randy Newman

- Land of Dreams (Reprise Records, 1988)

With Roy Orbison

- Mystery Girl (Virgin Records, 1989)

With The Graces

- Perfect View (A&M Records, 1989)

With The Temptations

- Special (Motown, 1989)
- Milestone (Motown, 1991)
- Awesome (Motown, 2001)

With Tom Petty

- Full Moon Fever (MCA Records, 1989)
- Wildflowers (Warner Bros. Records, 1994)
- Highway Companion (Warner Bros. Records, 2006)

With Paul Carrack

- Groove Approved (Chrysalis Records, 1989)

With Jeffrey Osborne

- Only Human (Arista Records, 1990)

With Jonathan Butler

- Heal Our Land (Jive, 1990)

With Roger McGuinn

- Back from Rio (Arista Records, 1991)

With Paula Abdul

- Spellbound (Virgin Records, 1991)

With Jennifer Holliday

- I'm on Your Side (Arista Records, 1991)

With Bob Seger

- The Fire Inside (Capitol Records, 1991)

With John Prine

- The Missing Years (Oh Boy Records, 1991)

With Joe Cocker

- Night Calls (Capitol Records, 1991)

With Tracy Chapman

- Matters of the Heart (Elektra Records, 1992)

With Robin Zander

- Robin Zander (Interscope Records, 1993)

With Michael McDonald

- Blink of an Eye (Reprise Records, 1993)

With Jackson Browne

- I'm Alive (Elektra Records, 1993)
- Looking East (Elektra Records, 1996)

With Christine Lakeland

- Reckoning (Virgin Records, 1993)

With Will Downing

- Love's the Place to Be (Mercury Records, 1993)
- Invitation Only (Mercury Records, 1997)

With Patti Scialfa

- Rumble Doll (Columbia Records, 1993)

With Randy Crawford

- Naked and True (WEA, 1995)

With Taj Mahal

- Phantom Blues (RCA Victor, 1996)

With The Wallflowers

- Bringing Down the Horse (Interscope Records, 1996)
- Breach (Interscope Records, 2000)

With Johnny Cash

- Unchained (American Recordings, 1996)
- American III: Solitary Man (American Recordings, 2000)
- American IV: The Man Comes Around (American Recordings, 2002)
- American V: A Hundred Highways (American Recordings, 2006)

With Mary J. Blige

- Share My World (MCA Records, 1997)

With Linda Ronstadt

- We Ran (Elektra Records, 1998)

With Cracker

- Gentleman's Blues (Virgin Records, 1998)

With Philip Bailey

- Soul on Jazz (Heads Up International Records, 2002)

With Bad Religion

- The Empire Strikes First (Epitaph Records, 2004)
- The Dissent of Man (Epitaph Records, 2010)

With Tift Merritt

- Tambourine (Lost Highway Records, 2004)

With Rob Thomas

- ...Something to Be (Atlantic Records, 2005)

With Neil Diamond

- 12 Songs (Columbia Records, 2005)
- Home Before Dark (Columbia Records, 2008)
- Dreams (Columbia Records, 2010)
- Wild at Heart (Capitol Records, 2026)

With Dixie Chicks

- Taking the Long Way (Columbia Nashville, 2006)

With The Dandy Warhols

- ...Earth to the Dandy Warhols... (Beat the World, 2008)

With Robert Francis

- Strangers in the First Place (Vanguard Records, 2012)

With Susanna Hoffs

- Someday (Baroque Folk, 2012)

With Chris Hillman

- Bidin' My Time (Rounder Records, 2017)

With David Garfield

- Outside the Box (Creatchy Records, 2018)

With Chris Stapleton

- Starting Over (Mercury Records, 2020)

With Margo Price

- Strays (Loma Vista Recordings, 2023)

With Ian Hunter

- Defiance Part 1 (Sun, 2023)

With Ringo Starr

- Rewind Forward (Universal Music, 2023)
