= Milestone (The Temptations album) =

Studio album by the Temptations
- Released: November 19, 1991
- Genre: Soul
- Length: 58:30
- Language: English
- Label: Motown
- Producers: Victor Carstarphen; CIROCCO; Barry Eastmond; Trevor Lawrence; Steve Lindsey; Freddie Rhone; Alton "Wokie" Stewart; Ron Tyson; Otis Williams

The Temptations chronology
Special (1989)	Milestone (1991)	For Lovers Only (1995)

Milestone is a 1991 studio album by American soul group the Temptations. It would be the last full-length album to feature founding member Melvin Franklin and the last to feature Richard Street, who exited the group in 1993, following a dispute with Williams.

== Reception ==
Editors at AllMusic Guide scored this album two out of five stars, with reviewer Ron Wynn characterizing it as "one of the most forgettable records in The Temptations' long and illustrious history", but still praising the vocals.

== Track listing ==
Side one
No.	Title	Writer(s)	Lead singer(s)	Length
1.	"Eenie, Meenie, Miinie, Moe"	Alton "Wokie" Stewart	Richard Street	4:05
2.	"Any Old Lovin' (Just Won't Do)"	Barry Eastmond, Ian Foster, and Jolyon Skinner	Ali-Ollie Woodson, Ron Tyson, Melvin Franklin, Street	4:18
3.	"Hoops of Fire"	Porter Carroll, Jeff Franzel and Nina Ossoff	Franklin (spoken word), Woodson	5:28
4.	"We Should Be Makin' Love"	Steve Kipner, and Steve Lindsey	Woodson	4:08
5.	"The Jones'"	Stewart	Woodson, Tyson, Street, Otis Williams	4:28

Side two
No.	Title	Writer(s)	Lead singer(s)	Length
1.	"Get Ready"	Smokey Robinson	Tyson, Woodson, Misa (rap)	4:29
2.	"Corner of My Heart"	Andy Goldmark and Kit Hain	Tyson	4:06
3.	"Whenever You're Ready"	Lionel Randolph, Freddie Rhone, Zack Vaz, and Otis Williams	Woodson	5:11
4.	"Do It Easy"	Bob Farrell, Bobby Smith, and Ron Tyson	Franklin	4:49
5.	"Wait a Minute"	Williams, Chaz	Williams and Woodson (spoken word intro), Woodson	5:09

CD only
No.	Title	Writer(s)	Lead singer(s)	Length
11.	"Celebrate"	Arlene Britt, Johnny Britt, Noam Kaniel		5:53
12.	"The Jones' (UK Remix)"	Stewart	Woodson, Tyson, Street, Williams	6:26

== Personnel ==
The Temptations

- Melvin Franklin – bass vocals
- Richard Street – second tenor vocals
- Ron Tyson – tenor and falsetto vocals, arrangements (9)
- Otis Williams – baritone vocals, arrangements (10)
- Ali-Ollie Woodson – vocals

Musicians

- Alton "Wokie" Stewart – all instruments (1, 5, 12), additional backing vocals (1, 5, 12), arrangements (1, 5, 12)
- Eric Rehl – keyboards (2), synthesizers (2), drum programming (2), rhythm arrangements (2), synthesizer programming (3)
- Barry Eastmond – additional keyboards (2), arrangements (2, 3), keyboards (3)
- Steve Lindsey – acoustic piano (4), organ (4), synthesizers (4), arrangements (4, 6, 7), drum programming (6, 7), keyboards (7)
- Airiq Anest – Sonix Matrix Assembly synthesizer (6), drum programming (7)
- John Barnes – keyboards (7)
- Lionel Randolph – keyboards (8), drum programming (8), string arrangements (8)
- Freddie Rhone – keyboards (8), bass (8), drum programming (8), arrangements (8), string arrangements (8)
- Victor Carstarphen – keyboards (10), arrangements (10)
- Cirocco – electric piano (11), synthesizers (11), guitars (11), arrangements (11)
- Russell Burt – synthesizer programming (11), computer programming (11)
- Danny G – keyboards (12)
- Mike Campbell – guitars (3)
- Paul Jackson Jr. – guitars (4), sitar (4), electric guitar (7)
- Dean Parks – acoustic guitar (7)
- Wah Wah Watson – guitars (8)
- Greg Moore – guitars (10)
- Freddie Washington – bass (4)
- Kerry Turman – bass (10)
- Horace "Bokie" Coleman – bass (11)
- Steve Ferrone – drums (3)
- James Gadson – drums (4)
- Howie Rice – drum programming (6)
- Khris Kellow – drum programming (6, 7), backing vocals (6), keyboards (7)
- Jeff Porcaro – drum overdubs (6), tambourine (6)
- Perry Wilson – drums (10)
- Richard Young – drum programming (11)
- Steve Kroon – percussion (3)
- Lenny Castro – tambourine (4), percussion (7, 8)
- Brandon Fields – saxophone (4), sax solo (10)
- Scott Mayo – sax solo (11)
- David Campbell – string arrangements (4, 7)
- Trevor Lawrence – arrangements (8)
- Johnny Britt – vocal arrangements (10)
- Misa – rapping (6)
- Alice Echols – backing vocals (10)
- Lynne Fiddmont-Linsey – backing vocals (10)

Production and Technical

- Zack Vaz – executive producer
- Otis Williams – executive producer, producer (10), recording assistant (10), liner notes
- Alton "Wokie" Stewart – producer (1, 5, 12)
- Barry Eastmond – producer (2, 3)
- Steve Lindsey – producer (4, 6, 7)
- Khris Kellow – additional production (6)
- Trevor Lawrence – producer (8)
- Freddie Rhone – producer (8)
- Ron Tyson – producer (9)
- Bob Farrell – co-producer (9)
- Victor Carstarphen – producer (10), recording assistant (10)
- Cirocco Jones – producer (11)
- Johnny Britt – additional production (11)
- Ray Hayden – additional production (12), engineer (12), remixing (12)
- Bob Jones – additional production (12), remixing (12)
- Rick Clifford – recording (1, 5)
- Bob Tucker – recording (1, 3, 5, 8, 10), mixing (8, 10)
- John Van Nest – mixing (1, 5)
- Earl Cohen – recording (2, 3), mixing (3)
- Roey Shamir – mixing (2)
- Airiq Anest – recording (4, 6, 7)
- Richard Cottrell – recording (4)
- Richard Kaplan – recording (4, 7)
- Elliott Peters – recording (4, 7)
- Lee Ann Ungar – recording (4, 7), mixing (4, 7)
- David Schober – recording (5)
- Gabe Veltri – recording (5)
- Greg Grill – recording (9)
- Joe McGrath – recording (9)
- Rick Campfield – mixing (9)
- Brad Buxer – recording (11)
- Tracy Chisolm – recording (11)
- Peter McCabe – recording (11)
- Bobby Brooks – mixing (11)
- Jim Kuoriak – recording assistant (2)
- Gayle Esposito – A&R assistant
- Venetta Jenkins – A&R assistant
- Gayle Woodard – A&R assistant
- Stephen Meltzer – art direction
- Kaie Wellman – design
- Aaron Rapoport – photography
- Shelly Berger – management
- Billie Bullock – management

== Chart performance ==
Milestone spent 12 weeks on the Billboard Top R&B/Hip Hop Albums chart, reaching up to 88 on January 18, 1992.

== See also ==
- List of 1991 albums
