= De Mel, De Melão =

EP by Portastatic
- Released: 2000
- Genre: Indie rock
- Label: Merge

De Mel, De Melão is CD EP by the band Portastatic. It was released on the Merge Records label in 2000.

All five songs on the EP are covers of Brazilian musical artists from the tropicalia and Música popular brasileira movements. It was inspired by a trip Mac McCaughan made to Brazil with his other band Superchunk.

== Track listing ==
1. "Baby" (Caetano Veloso)
2. "Lamento Sertanejo" (Dominguinhos, Gilberto Gil)
3. "I Fell In Love One Day" (Arnaldo Baptista)
4. "Não Identificado" (Caetano Veloso)
5. "Clareana" (Joyce)
