= Bear Creek Studio =

Recording studio in Woodinville, Washington, US

Coordinates: 47°48′21.42″N 122°8′58.74″W

Bear Creek Studio is a residential recording studio located in a barn on a 10 acre farm in Woodinville, Washington. A number of notable artists have recorded at the studio since its establishment in 1977, including: Brandi Carlile, Train, the Lumineers, Soundgarden, the Mountain Goats, Foo Fighters, James Brown, Modest Mouse, L.A. Edwards, Geoff Tate, The Tragically Hip, Eric Clapton and Lionel Richie.

== History ==
Musician Joe Hadlock and his wife Manny began their professional music careers producing commercial jingles and engineering at Sea-West Studios in Seattle, where they became business partners. When the Hadlocks learned in 1977 that Sea-West would soon be booked for months by Heart to record their next album, Joe and Manny decided to build their own recording studio to maintain their productivity. They converted what was originally a 19th century dairy barn on their 10 acre farm in Woodinville, Washington into a state-of-the-art recording studio, while retaining the rural setting. Working with architect Doug Thompson, a new post and beam structure was created on the footprint of the old 1750 square foot barn. The new studio was outfitted with a Quad-Eight mixing console from the Village Recorder, which was replaced in the early 1980s by a Trident TSM console purchased from Cherokee Studios. While the recording studio was still used for commercials from time to time, the Hadlocks kept those two sides of their business separated, as they felt the music industry considered it "not hip" to be producing jingles.

While not initially a residential recording studio, by the late 1980s Bear Creek had expanded to include residential accommodations, and in 1991 Soundgarden spent six weeks at the studio during the recording of Badmotorfinger. In the mid-nineties, a new tracking room was constructed which doubled the size of the studio.

In 2013, Bear Creek added an additional treehouse-based recording studio, which was featured on the February 21, 2014 episode of Treehouse Masters, which featured CeeLo Green. The 300 square foot Pro Tools studio, which is 18 feet above the ground in a western red cedar, was co-designed by the show's host Pete Nelson and original studio co-founder Joe Hadlock. It includes two beds, a balcony, and a loft.

Bear Creek is known for its "rural farmhouse" location. James Shaw of Metric called it "the oldest family owned studio in America, and is a really special place." Chris Cornell said: "It was such a pleasant place, we didn't want to leave."
