= I Hope Your Heart Is Not Brittle =

Studio album by Portastatic
- Released: 1994
- Genre: Indie rock
- Length: 48:26
- Label: Merge
- Producer: Mac McCaughan, Jerry Kee

Portastatic chronology
I Hope Your Heart Is Not Brittle (1994)	Slow Note from a Sinking Ship (1995)

Professional ratings
Review scores
Source	Rating
AllMusic	4/5 stars
Spin Alternative Record Guide	7/10

I Hope Your Heart Is Not Brittle is Portastatic's first studio album. It was released by Merge Records in 1994.

It was also released in Japan with additional bonus tracks. These tracks are "Mute 1" which is the same as the Untitled hidden track on the US Merge release, "Replacement Parts" which is mislabeled, and is actually the song "Look Honey, Peaches" (available on the A Day in the Park compilation) and "Weighted Raft" (also available on the Ow!, Quit It 2x 7" compilation). According to Mac McCaughan, "Replacement Parts" was an unreleased song recorded for this album, but was not released until the compilation album, Some Small History (2008).

All songs on the album were performed entirely by Mac McCaughan, except "Naked Pilsners" which features Jennifer Walker on bass and V vocals, and "Beer and Chocolate Bars" which features Kaye Woodward on vocals.

The album was partially recorded at Duck Kee Studio in Mebane, North Carolina, by Jerry Kee, and partially on a Portastudio 4-track cassette recorder by Mac McCaughan.

== Track listing ==
1. "Mute 2"
2. "Polaroid"
3. "Gutter"
4. "Naked Pilseners"
5. "Tree Killer"
6. "Creeping Around"
7. "Weird Time"
8. "Silver Screw"
9. "Beer and Chocolate Bars"
10. "Had"
11. "Memphis"
12. "Receiver"
13. "Why Have You Come Back"
14. "The Main Thing"
15. "Untitled Bonus Track (Mute 1)"
