= Wreckless Abandon =

Studio album by The Dirty Knobs
- Released: November 20, 2020
- Studio: Hocus Pocus Recorders, California, US
- Genre: Rock
- Length: 56:16
- Language: English
- Label: BMG
- Producer: Mike Campbell; George Drakoulias

The Dirty Knobs chronology
Wreckless Abandon (2020)	External Combustion (2022)

“I never really had a solo record in mind. I have a lot of songs, and I would always give them to Tom [Petty]. If I was fortunate, he would write to the good ones. But I ended up piling up so many pieces of music that he couldn’t possibly ever write to all of them. That’s when I started just writing to them myself for fun, just to see what they would sound like.”

— Mike Campbell on songwriting and recording the debut Dirty Knobs album

Wreckless Abandon is the debut album by American rock band The Dirty Knobs. Released by BMG Rights Management in 2021, the album has received positive reviews from critics. The album was largely recorded live to tape in frontman Mike Campbell's home studio and include compositions that he had written over the course of almost 20 years with the band. The album also features Campbell's former bandmate Benmont Tench and the recording process helped Campbell grieve the 2017 death of longtime collaborator Tom Petty. The Dirty Knobs had been Campbell's side project between Heartbreakers and Mudcrutch work and became his primary focus after Petty's death, leading to this recording and Campbell's first attempts to find a unique voice as a songwriter and performer.

== Reception ==
According to the review aggregator Metacritic, Wreckless Abandon received "generally favorable reviews" based on a weighted average score of 72 out of 100 from six critic scores. Editors at AllMusic rated this album 3 out of 5 stars, with critic Stephen Thomas Erlewine writing that "Wreckless Abandon is noisier, dirtier, and sometimes heavier than a Heartbreakers record, a tendency that's leavened by the group's fondness for melody and a distinct sense of good humor that bubbles up". In American Songwriter, Lee Zimmerman scored this release 3 out of 5 stars, praising the group's rock pedigree, but criticizing that "it leaves little that hasn’t been rehashed dozens of times before". In Classic Rock, Neil Jeffries gave this album 4 out of 5 stars, comparing the work to J. J. Cale, John Lee Hooker, and Tom Petty and the Heartbreakers. Glide Magazine's Steve Ovadia noted the similarities with Campbell's previous collaborations with Tom Petty, but finished his review stating that "Campbell chose to embrace his personal sound, owning it, and refining it. It’s not an easy task but Campbell and the Dirty Knobs take it seriously". Writing for Relix, Jeff Tamarkin stated that this music is harder than Tom Petty and also features a country music influence.

== Track listing ==
All songs written by Mike Campbell, except where noted.

1. "Wreckless Abandon" – 6:03
2. "Pistol Packin’ Mama" – 4:10
3. "Sugar" – 4:40
4. "Southern Boy" – 4:46
5. "I Still Love You" – 5:18
6. "Irish Girl" – 4:25
7. "Fuck That Guy" (Campbell and Chris Stapleton) – 3:10
8. "Don’t Knock the Boogie" (Campbell and George Drakoulias) – 6:57
9. "Don’t Wait" – 4:59
10. "Anna Lee" – 3:43
11. "Aw Honey" – 3:04
12. "Loaded Gun" – 4:02
13. "Don’t Knock the Boogie (Coda)" (Campbell and Drakoulias) – 1:00

== Personnel ==
The Dirty Knobs

- Mike Campbell – lead guitar, harmonica, vocals, production
- Matt Laug – drums, backing vocals
- Lance Morrison – bass guitar, photography
- Jason Sinay – guitar, vocals

Additional personnel

- George Drakoulias – percussion, backing vocals, production
- Sheva Kafai – photography
- Pamela Littky – photography
- Augie Meyers – Farfisa organ on "Pistol Packin' Mama"
- Martin Pradler – engineering, mixing, mastering
- Chad Sengstock – photography
- Chris Stapleton – vocals on "Pistol Packin' Mama" and "Irish Girl"
- Benmont Tench – piano on "Aw Honey"
- Andy Tennille – photography
- Jaan Uhelszki – liner notes
- Klaus Voormann – cover art
- Miles Wintner – layout

== See also ==
- 2020 in American music
- List of 2020 albums
