= Slow Note from a Sinking Ship =

Studio album by Portastatic
- Released: June 20, 1995
- Genre: Indie rock
- Length: 55:25
- Label: Merge
- Producer: Mac McCaughan, Jerry Kee

Portastatic chronology
I Hope Your Heart Is Not Brittle (1994)	Slow Note from a Sinking Ship (1995)	The Nature of Sap (1997)

Professional ratings
Review scores
Source	Rating
AllMusic	3/5 stars

Slow Note from a Sinking Ship is Portastatic's second studio album. It was released on Merge Records on June 20, 1995.

The album was recorded at Duck Kee Studios by Jerry Kee, except "Skinny Glasses Girl", "The Angels of Sleep", "Spooky", "Running Water" and "Isn't That The Way", which were recorded by Mac McCaughan on a Tascam 424 4-Track cassette recorder "with little or no engineering involved."

The CD and vinyl versions of the album had different track listings and running orders. "Spooky" and the hidden track appear on the CD only. "Your Own Cloud" appears on the LP only. In addition the second side of the vinyl LP ends with an endless loop of synth sound from the ending of "In The Manner of Anne Frank."

== CD track listing ==
1. "When You Crashed"
2. "Skinny Glasses Girl"
3. "San Andreas"
4. "Taking You With Me"
5. "The Angles of Sleep"
6. "A Cunning Latch"
7. "Spooky"
8. "The Great Escape"
9. "Running Water"
10. "You Can't Win"
11. "Isn't That The Way"
12. "On Our Hands"
13. "Pastime"
14. "In The Manner of Anne Frank"
15. "Hidden Track"

== Vinyl LP track listing ==
=== Side 1 ===
1. "Your Own Cloud"
2. "San Andreas"
3. "Skinny Glasses Girl"
4. "When You Crashed"
5. "You Can't Win"
6. "Running Water"
7. "A Cunning Latch"

=== Side 2 ===
1. "The Great Escape"
2. "Isn't That The Way"
3. "Taking You With Me"
4. "On Our Hands"
5. "The Angles of Sleep"
6. "Pastime"
7. "In The Manner of Anne Frank"
