= The Nature of Sap =

Studio album by Portastatic
- Released: March 11, 1997
- Genre: Indie rock
- Label: Merge
- Producer: Mac McCaughan

Portastatic chronology
Slow Note from a Sinking Ship (1995)	The Nature of Sap (1997)	Summer of the Shark (2003)

Professional ratings
Review scores
Source	Rating
AllMusic	3/5 stars
The Encyclopedia of Popular Music	3/5 stars
MusicHound Rock: The Essential Album Guide	3/5 stars

The Nature of Sap is Portastatic's third studio album. It was released on Merge Records on March 11, 1997.

== Production ==
The album was recorded at Duck Kee Studios in Mebane, North Carolina, during the summer of 1996, except tracks 4, 7-9, and 11, which were recorded on 4-track cassette on "Old NC 86." Matt McCaughan plays drums on many of the album's tracks.

== Critical reception ==
The Tucson Weekly wrote that "Portastatic seems to be what happens when an aging punk rocker and his ambitious musical vision 'mature': passivity, depression and terminal boredom." Phoenix New Times called the album "a multilayered opus of pop precocity." Paste deemed it the band's most underrated album, calling it "a downcast jazzy pop record that dabbles with electronic minimalism and features some of [Mac] McCaughan’s best song writing." SF Weekly wrote that The Nature of Sap "finds the normally manic Superchunk frontman in an extended soporific spelunk through the caves of his waking dreams."

== Track listing ==
1. "You Know Where to Find Me"
2. "A Lovely Nile"
3. "Hurricane Warning (Ignored)"
4. "Reverse Lester"
5. "Flare"
6. "Jonathan's Organ"
7. "Before You Sailed Around the World"
8. "Ben's Revenge"
9. "Impolite Cheers"
10. "Spying on the Spys"
11. "BJJT"
12. "Landed"
13. "If You Could Sing"
14. "The Nature of Sap"
15. "[Silent Hidden Track]"
16. "[Untitled Hidden Track]"
