= L.A. Edwards =

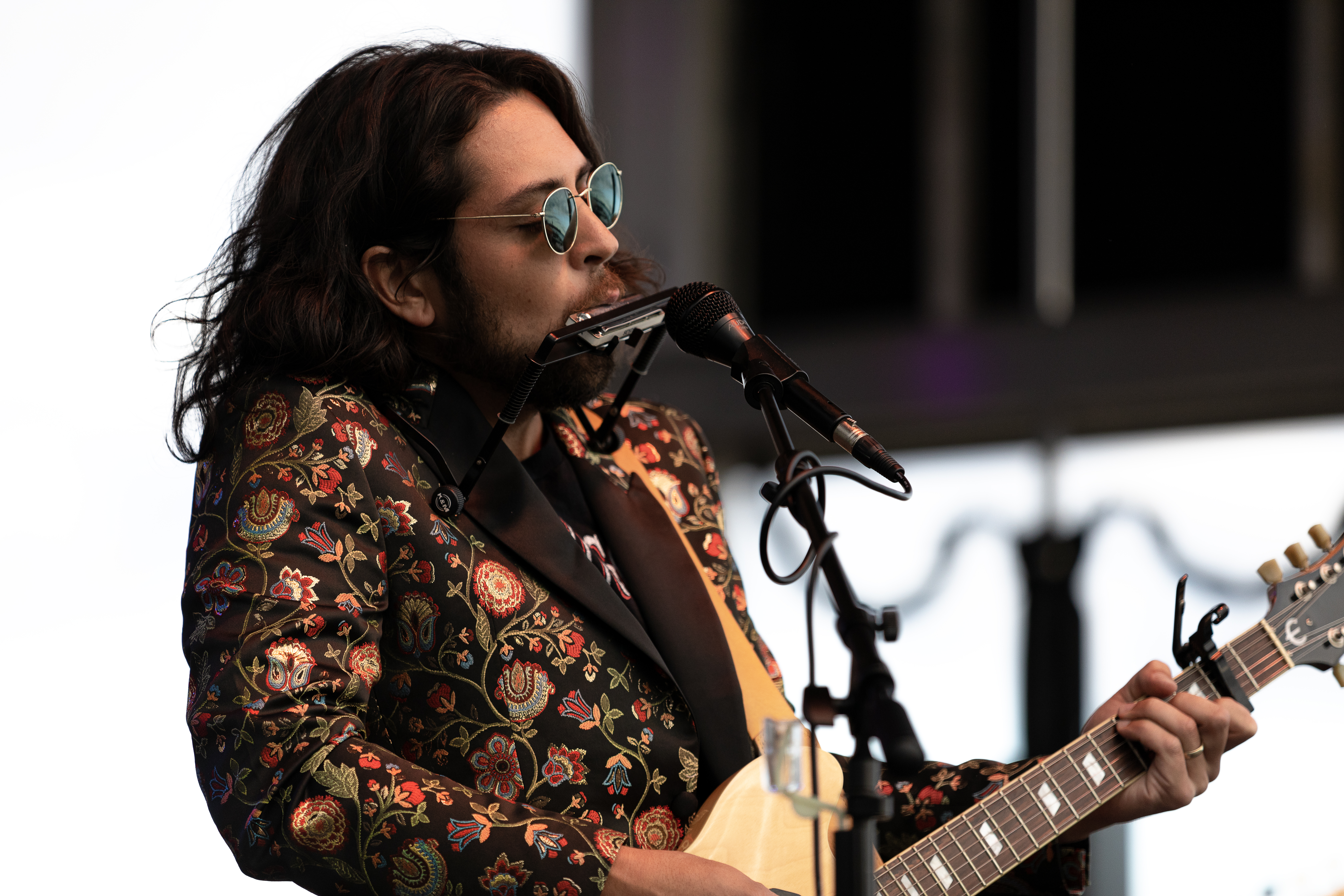

Background information
- Origin: Carlsbad, California
- Genre: Rock music
- Years active: 2015 to present
- Members: Luke Edwards (vocals); Jay Edwards (guitar); Jerry Edwards (drums)
- Website: www.laedwards.net

L.A. Edwards is a musical group founded in California in 2015. It is named after its songwriter and vocalist, Luke Edwards.

== History ==
Luke Andrew Edwards is a songwriter and multi-instrumentalist, and began his career as a solo artist when he dropped out of high school at the age of sixteen in order to start his musical career. L.A. Edwards, originally a solo project, is now a band that consists of five members. He tours as L.A. Edwards with his brothers Jay Edwards (guitar) and Jerry Edwards (drums), and keyboardist Landon Pigg and bassist Jesse Dorman.

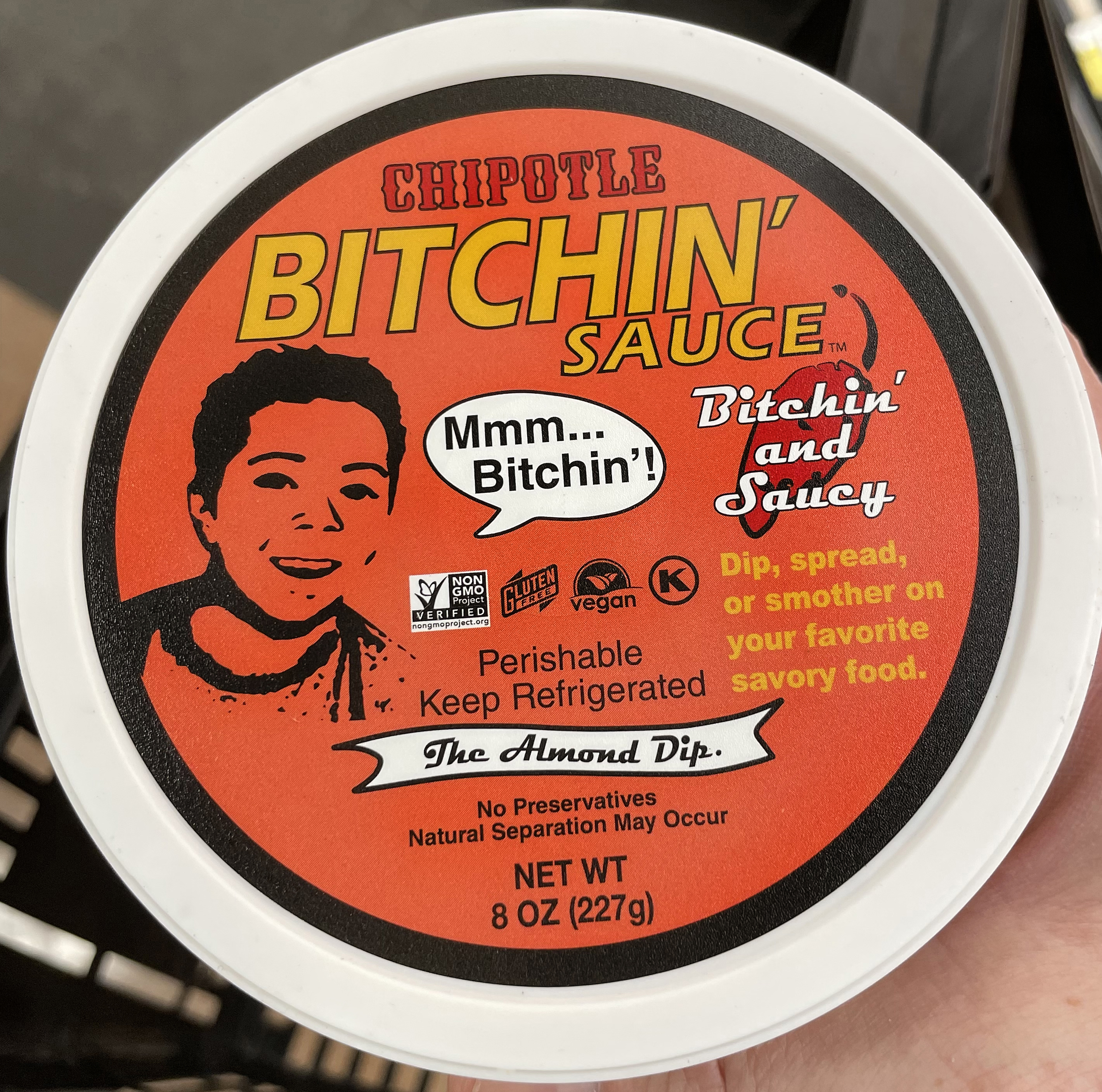
Luke and Starr Edwards' Bitchin' Sauce (chipotle)

While their sound was originally folk-leaning, the group now leans more strongly to rock music. Luke is also the founder of the recording label Bitchin’ Music Group, named for the vegan sauce brand run by Edwards and his wife Starr Edwards based in Carlsbad, California. The label partners with The Orchard (company).

== Albums ==
L.A. Edwards debuted in 2015 with the EP Secret's We’ll Never Know. Their second album, True Blue, was released in 2018. They then released the album Blessings from Home Vol 1 in 2021 with producer Ryan Hadlock as well as Blessings from Home, Vol 2., produced by Ryan Hadlock at Bear Creek Studio in Woodinville, WA, and features Ron Blair and fellow Heartbreakers alum Steve Ferrone playing bass and drums. In 2023 they released their fourth album, Out of the Heart of Darkness. In 2024 they released their album Pie Town.

Music from the group has been used by television series including Yellowstone, Mayor of Kingstown, Overboard, and Walker. L.A. Edwards wrote and recorded several tracks on the soundtrack of the film Sleeping Dogs.

== Touring ==
L.A. Edwards has toured internationally, and performed at concerts beside bands including The White Buffalo, the Beach Boys, Jefferson Starship, Lucinda Williams, and Rival Sons.
