= Be Still Please =

Studio album by Portastatic
- Released: October 10, 2006
- Genre: Indie rock
- Length: 39:46
- Label: Merge
- Producer: Mac McCaughan

Portastatic chronology
Bright Ideas (2005)	Be Still Please (2006)	Some Small History (2008)

Professional ratings
Aggregate scores
Source	Rating
Metacritic	81/100
Review scores
Source	Rating
AllMusic	4.5/5 stars
Paste	3.5/5 stars
Pitchfork	7.6/10
PopMatters	7/10
Spin	3/5 stars
Tiny Mix Tapes	4.5/5 stars
Under the Radar	7/10

Be Still Please is an album by Portastatic. It was released on Merge Records on October 10, 2006.

The album was recorded at Pox Studios with Zeno Gill, with additional recording at Room 8 in Carrboro, North Carolina. It was mixed at Overdub Lane in Durham, North Carolina, with John Plymale.

== Track listing ==
No.	Title	Length
1.	"Sour Shores"	04:37
2.	"Black Buttons"	05:24
3.	"I'm in Love" (with Arthur Dove)	03:36
4.	"Sweetness and Light"	04:40
5.	"Getting Saved"	05:39
6.	"You Blanks"	04:13
7.	"Like a Pearl"	04:34
8.	"Cheers and Applause"	04:21
9.	"Song for a Clock"	02:42
Total length:		39:46
