= Bramble Rose =

Studio album by Tift Merritt
- Released: 2002
- Recorded: Sunset Sound Factory (Los Angeles, California)
- Genre: Alternative Country, Americana
- Length: 52:37
- Label: Lost Highway
- Producer: Ethan Johns

Tift Merritt chronology
The Two Dollar Pistols with Tift Merritt (1999)	Bramble Rose (2002)	Tambourine (2004)

Bramble Rose is the debut album by alternative country artist Tift Merritt. It was released on Lost Highway Records in 2002.

== Reception ==
Professional ratings
Review scores
Source	Rating
Allmusic	4.5/5 stars

AllMusic's Mark Deming rated the album 4.5 out of 5 stars, saying: "If Bramble Rose is a bit short of perfect, it leaves no doubt that Merritt is already a talent of the first order."

== Other versions ==
On September 25, 2015, Don Henley released a cover version of the title track, featuring Mick Jagger and Miranda Lambert, on his album Cass County.

== Track listing ==
All songs written by Tift Merritt.

No.	Title	Length
1.	"Trouble Over Me"	5:08
2.	"Virginia, No One Can Warn You"	4:25
3.	"Neighborhood"	3:20
4.	"Bird of Freedom"	4:08
5.	"Bramble Rose"	4:30
6.	"I Know Him Too"	3:53
7.	"Sunday"	6:11
8.	"Supposed to Make You Happy"	4:20
9.	"Diamond Shoes"	4:48
10.	"Are You Still in Love with Me?"	5:22
11.	"When I Cross Over"	6:32
Total length:		52:37

== Personnel ==
- Tift Merritt – vocals, rhythm guitar; piano (4)
- Greg Reading – pedal steel guitar, dobro, harmony vocals; Wurlitzer (7)
- Jay Brown – bass, harmony vocals
- Zeke Hutchins – drums
- Ethan Johns – lead guitar, percussion; piano (1), ukulele (2), Hammond B-3 (3), Chamberlin (3,5), mandolin (5), Omnichord (11)
- Benmont Tench – piano, celeste, Hammond C-3; harmonium (5)
- C.C. White – harmony vocal (7)
- Julianna Raye – harmony vocal (7)

Technical

- Ethan Johns – producer, mixing, engineering
- Stephen Rhodes – engineering
- Doug Sax – mastering
- Karen Naff – art direction and design
- Tony Baker – photography

== Chart performance ==
Chart (2002)	Peak position
U.S. Billboard Top Country Albums	47
