= Bright Ideas =

Studio album by Portastatic
- Released: August 23, 2005
- Studio: Tiny Telephone, San Francisco
- Genre: Indie rock
- Label: Merge
- Producer: Mac McCaughan

Portastatic chronology
Summer of the Shark (2003)	Bright Ideas (2005)	Be Still Please (2006)

Professional ratings
Aggregate scores
Source	Rating
Metacritic	83/100
Review scores
Source	Rating
AllMusic	4.5/5 stars
Alternative Press	5/5 stars
Now	4/5 stars
Paste	4/5 stars
Pitchfork	6.9/10
PopMatters	8/10
Tiny Mix Tapes	3/5 stars
Under the Radar	6/10

Bright Ideas is the fifth studio album by the American indie rock band Portastatic. It was released on Merge Records on August 23, 2005

The album was the first Portastatic album that was completely recorded in a modern studio. Previous albums were either partially or completely recorded on a Portastudio 4-track recorder. The album was recorded at Tiny Telephone Studios in San Francisco, California and engineered by Tim Mooney.

== Track listing ==
1. "Bright Ideas"
2. "Through With People"
3. "White Wave"
4. "I Wanna Know Girls"
5. "Little Fern"
6. "Truckstop Cassettes"
7. "The Soft Rewind"
8. "Registered Ghost"
9. "Center of the World"
10. "Full of Stars"
