= Portastatic =

American indie rock band

- Performing at the Black Cat in 2005.

Background information
- Origin: Chapel Hill, North Carolina, US
- Genres: Rock and roll, indie rock, Brazilian, film scores
- Years active: 1992–present
- Labels: 18 Wheeler, Matador, Hello, Esther, Merge
- Members: Mac McCaughan
- Website: mergerecords.com/portastatic Portastatic myspace

Portastatic is an American indie rock band founded in the early 1990s as a solo project of Mac McCaughan, singer and guitarist of the indie rock band Superchunk. The project has since expanded into a full band, sometimes including Superchunk guitarist Jim Wilbur and McCaughan's brother Matthew.

Tom Scharpling of the 18 Wheeler fanzine released McCaughan's solo material under the fanzine's own imprint in 1993, the "Starter" 7". Since then, McCaughan has recorded several records as Portastatic, covering genres including indie rock, lo-fi, soundtrack and Brazilian music.

The name "Portastatic" is derived from the TASCAM Portastudio home recording device.

== Discography ==
=== Official albums ===
- 1994 - I Hope Your Heart Is Not Brittle (CD/LP) [Merge]
- 1995 - Slow Note From a Sinking Ship (CD/LP) [Merge]
- 1997 - The Nature of Sap (CD/LP) [Merge]
- 2003 - Summer of the Shark (CD) [Merge]
- 2005 - Bright Ideas (CD) [Merge]
- 2006 - Be Still Please (CD) [Merge]

=== Compilation albums ===
- 2008 - Some Small History (CD) [Merge]

=== Demo albums ===
- 2005 - Ideas for Bright Ideas (CD) [The Portastatic Label]
- 2006 - Some Small Things You Can't Defend (CD) [The Portastatic Label]

=== Soundtracks ===
- 2001 - Looking for Leonard (CD) [Merge]
- 2006 - Who Loves the Sun (CD) [Merge]

=== Singles and EPs ===
- 1993 - Starter (7") [18 Wheeler]
- 1994 - Naked Pilseners (7"/CD EP) [Matador]
- 1994 - Hello CD of the Month (CD EP) [Hello]
- 1994 - San Andreas Couch (7") [Ester]
- 1995 - Scrapbook X's (7") [18 Wheeler]
- 1995 - Scrapbook EP (Double 7"/CD EP) [Merge]
- 1996 - Spying On The Spys (7") [Merge]
- 1997 - Trash Heap - Split 7" w/ Ida (Split 7") [Trash Heap]
- 1997 - Portastatic/The Landing Split 7" (Split 7") [Sarang Bang]: "Secret Session"/"And Forward Again"
- 1997 - Portastatic/The Ladybug Transistor/Land of the Loops Split 7" (Split 7") [After Hours]: "You Love To Fail"
- 2000 - De Mel, De Melão (CD EP) [Merge]
- 2001 - The Perfect Little Door (Featuring Ken Vandermark)(CD EP) [Merge]
- 2003 - Autumn Was a Lark (CD EP) [Merge]
- 2005 - Looking for a Power Supply (CD EP) [Houston Party]
- 2005 - I Wanna Know Girls (Digital EP) [iTunes/Merge]
- 2006 - Sour Shores (Digital EP) [Merge]
- 2009 - Make It Sound In Tune (Digital EP) [Merge]
