= Tambourine (album) =

Studio album by Tift Merritt
- Released: 2004
- Studio: Sound City Studios; M.C. Studios; Glenwood Place; Cello Studios; Los Angeles, California
- Genre: Alternative Country, Americana
- Length: 46:04
- Label: Lost Highway
- Producer: George Drakoulias

Tift Merritt chronology
Bramble Rose (2002)	Tambourine (2004)	Home Is Loud (2005)

Professional ratings
Review scores
Source	Rating
AllMusic	4.5/5 stars
Pitchfork	7.3/10
Rolling Stone	3/5 stars

Tambourine is the second album by alternative country artist Tift Merritt. It was released in 2004 by Lost Highway Records, and earned her a Grammy nomination for Best Country Album.

== Track listing ==
All tracks are written by Tift Merritt except where noted

No.	Title	Writer(s)	Length
1.	"Stray Paper"		3:52
2.	"Wait it Out"	Tift Merritt, Jay Joyce	3:34
3.	"Good Hearted Man"		3:39
4.	"Ain't Looking Closely"		4:23
5.	"Still Pretending"		3:40
6.	"Write My Ticket"		3:42
7.	"Your Love Made a U-Turn"	McClinton Osbie Burnett	2:33
8.	"Plainest Thing"		3:30
9.	"Late Night Pilgrim"		4:23
10.	"I Am Your Tambourine"		3:42
11.	"Laid a Highway"		3:51
12.	"Shadow in the Way"		4:42

iTunes bonus track
No.	Title	Length
13.	"Easy to Change"	3:53

== Personnel ==
- Tift Merritt – vocals, Wurlitzer
- Mike Campbell – guitar, pump organ
- Jason Sinay – guitar
- Robert Randolph – pedal steel guitar
- Lance Morrison – bass
- Benmont Tench – melodica, Wurlitzer
- Brandon Bush – Farfisa organ, Hammond B-3
- Don Heffington – drums
- Zeke Hutchins – tom toms
- George Drakoulias – percussion
- Patrick Warren – chamberlain, celeste
- Joseph Sublett, Darrell Leonard, Gregory H. Smith – horns
- Neal Casal, Margaret Fowler, Jim Gilstrap, Lani Groves, Ellis Hall, Gary Louris, Maxayn Lewis, Maria McKee, Tata Vega, Julia Waters, Maxine Waters, Oren Waters, – background vocals

Technical

- Jim Scott, Ryan Hewitt – recording engineer
- Jim Scott, David Bianco – mixing
- Richard Dodd – mastering
- Roberto D'este, Neal Casal – photography
- Bethany Newman – art direction and design
- Bethany Newman – design
