= Some Small History =

Compilation album by Portastatic
- Released: September 9, 2008
- Genre: Indie rock
- Label: Merge
- Producer: Mac McCaughan

Portastatic chronology
Be Still Please (2006)	Some Small History (2008)

Professional ratings
Review scores
Source	Rating
AllMusic	4.5/5 stars

Some Small History is a collection of "rarities, collecting B-sides, compilation tracks, EPs, fanzine vinyl, and previously unreleased material recorded between 1990 and 2007" from the band Portastatic. It was released on Merge Records on September 9, 2008.

The album includes a number of cover songs including songs by Ryan Adams, The Undertones, The Magnetic Fields, Prefab Sprout, Sandy Denny and The Strawbs, Hot Chip, Galaxie 500, American Music Club, and Bob Dylan. The release was a limited edition of 3000 copies.

Merge Records also released a bonus download from their website with 11 rare tracks that did not make the album.

One additional rare track, "Do You Want to Buy a Bridge?" from the "Spying On the Spys" 7" single was not included because Mac McCaughan found the song to be "embarrassing."

== Track listing ==
- disc one:
1. "Starter"
2. "Sandals with White Socks "
3. "Oh, My Sweet Carolina" (Ryan Adams)
4. "Lousy Penpal*"
5. "A Cunning Latch (acoustic)*"
6. "Teenage Kicks" (The Undertones)
7. "Too Trashed to Smoke*"
8. "Skinny Glasses Girl"
9. "Trajectory"
10. "Power Supply"
11. "Josephine" (The Magnetic Fields)
12. "Race You Home"
13. "Make You Up*"
14. "Your Own Cloud"
15. "When Love Breaks Down*" (Prefab Sprout)
16. "Portraits From Before The War"
17. "Gray Robbins"
18. "Easily Aroused"
19. "Guessing"
20. "Little Fern"
21. "All I Need Is You" (Sandy Denny and the Strawbs)
22. "You Love To Fail" (The Magnetic Fields)
- disc two:
1. "Some Small History"
2. "San Andreas Crouch"
3. "Not The Same"
4. "And I Was a Boy from School" (Hot Chip)
5. "Spying on the Spys"
6. "Too Close to the Screen"
7. "Weighted Raft"
8. "Dragging a Crow"
9. "Soft Fruit"
10. "I Wanna Know Girls" (acoustic demo)
11. "Feel Better"
12. "Useless Switch"
13. "Had" (full band)*
14. "Secret Session"
15. "Tugboat" (Galaxie 500)
16. "Codes, Runes, Dunes"
17. "Candy Cigarettes"
18. "Firefly" (American Music Club)
19. "La Pelicula"
20. "Look, Honey, Peaches"
21. "Replacement Parts*"
22. "It's All Over Now, Baby Blue" (Bob Dylan)

Bonus Download:

1. "Slant Roof"
2. "Weedhopper"
3. "A Faithless Auld Lang Syne"
4. "Books For Any Occasion"
5. "Clean Barrel"
6. "Following Footprints"
7. "Echoes Myron" (Guided By Voices)
8. "Duck 96"
9. "(What's So Funny 'Bout) Peace Love & Understanding" (Nick Lowe)
10. "Jetlag"
11. "Flat Roof"
