= George Drakoulias =

Greek-American music producer

- Born: 1965 (age 60–61); Syosset, New York, U.S.
- Occupations: Record producer; A&R executive

George Drakoulias (born 1965) is a Greek-American record producer and a former A&R executive at the record label American Recordings.

== Biography ==
Drakoulias grew up in Syosset, New York, and attended Syosset High School, where he started his musical career with a band called Lifeline. He went to college at New York University (NYU), where he majored in music and business. There he befriended Rick Rubin, whom he met after he started dating an ex-girlfriend of Rubin's. He became one of the first hires for Rubin's Def Jam label. After Rubin left Def Jam to move to Los Angeles and form the Def American label, which was later retitled American Recordings, Drakoulias moved with him and became a producer. Drakoulias signed The Black Crowes, The Jayhawks and The Freewheelers to American Recordings, and produced albums for all three. He has also produced albums for artists including Tom Petty and the Heartbreakers, Maria McKee, Primal Scream, Madrugada, Screaming Trees and Unida. He has also produced tracks for Kula Shaker and served as a music supervisor for a number of movies, including Blades of Glory, School of Rock, Star Trek, Team America: World Police, Tropic Thunder, The Runaways, Zodiac, The Hangover, The Hangover Part II, Super 8, Joker, and Barbie. Drakoulias also plays bass guitar on the Glenn Danzig & the Power and Fury Orchestra song "Less Than Zero".

== Cultural references ==
- Drakoulias is mentioned in the "Stop That Train" section of the song B-Boy Bouillabaisse on the Beastie Boys album Paul's Boutique in the lyric, "Sat across from my man reading El Diario, riding the train down from the El Barrio. Went from the station, to Orange Julius, I brought a hot dog from who? George Drakoulias."
- The character Oseary Drakoulias in the film The Life Aquatic with Steve Zissou is named after Drakoulias and Guy Oseary.
- The character Big George Drakoulias, played by Billy Bob Thornton in the film Dead Man, is named after Drakoulias. (Jared Harris, incidentally, plays a character named after Benmont Tench of the Heartbreakers in the same film.)
- In a nod to his work on Star Trek, an alien predator which hunts down young James T. Kirk on Delta Vega (in the novelization of the film, Kirk describes it as the "bastard offspring" of a polar bear and a gorilla) is officially named the drakoulias.

== Albums produced ==
- (1990) Shake your Money Maker, The Black Crowes
- (1991) White Trash, White Trash
- (1992) The Southern Harmony and Musical Companion, The Black Crowes
- (1992) Hollywood Town Hall, The Jayhawks
- (1993) You Gotta Sin to Get Saved, Maria McKee
- (1994) Give Out But Don't Give Up, Primal Scream
- (1994) Carnival of Light, Ride ("How Does It Feel To Feel?")
- (1995) Tomorrow the Green Grass, The Jayhawks
- (1996) Dust, Screaming Trees
- (1996) Waitin' for George, The Freewheelers
- (1997) Glow, Reef
- (1998) No. 4 Record, You Am I
- (2002) The Red Record, Loudermilk
- (2002) The Last DJ, Tom Petty and the Heartbreakers
- (2004) Tambourine, Tift Merritt
- (2005) The Deep End, Madrugada
- (2006) The Believer, Rhett Miller
- (2007) 8 Diagrams, Wu-Tang Clan ("The Heart Gently Weeps", "Weak Spot")
- (2007) Low Stars, Low Stars
- (2008) Another Country, Tift Merritt
- (2008) You Can Do Anything, The Zutons
- (2008) Addicted to Company Part 1,Paddy Casey
- (2008) Back to the River, Susan Tedeschi
- (2012) Blind Sighted Faith, The Dunwells ("So Beautiful")
- (2020) Wreckless Abandon, The Dirty Knobs

== Film produced ==
- (2014) She's Funny That Way (Producer)
