= Surf-n-Burn =

Surf-N-Burn

Studio album by Blue Stingrays
- Released: 1997
- Genre: surf rock

Surf-N-Burn is a 1997 surf-rock album by the Blue Stingrays. Its tracks express a variety of moods, from the secret agent intrigue of "Russian Roulette" and "Goldfinger" (a cover of the theme from the James Bond film of the same name), to the soft surfing themes "Surfer's Life" and "Green Sea", to the beach-shack rave-ups (complete with audience noise) "Monsoon" and "Super Hero", all in the styles of the early surf-rockers.

This disc's liner notes tell a fictitious story of origins of the Blue Stingrays—claiming they formed in 1959 and were among both the earliest and most influential surf-rockers; who, after tiring of the exploitation of surf culture, moved to a small South Pacific island. Completing the retro feel, this album was also released as an LP (by Epitone/Epitaph). In reality, the Blue Stingrays was a side project for members of Tom Petty and the Heartbreakers.

A blue guitar pick stamped with the Stingrays' logo was included with the CD.

== Track listing ==
The ASCAP database lists Mike Campbell as the sole author of all tracks, except as noted.

1. "Monsoon" – 3:03
2. "Echo Park" – 2:52
3. "Goldfinger" – 3:22 (John Barry, Leslie Bricusse, Anthony Newley)
4. "Brave New World" – 4:30
5. "Russian Roulette" – 3:27
6. "Moon over Catalina" – 2:37
7. "Malibu Babylon" – 3:48
8. "Blue Venus" – 2:52
9. "Land of the Unknown" – 3:30
10. "Surfer's Life" – 4:12
11. "Stingray Stomp" – 2:32
12. "Zuma Sunset" – 2:41
13. "Ju Ju Beads" – 2:29
14. "Green Sea" – 2:19
15. "Super Hero" – 3:26
