= Summer of the Shark (album) =

Studio album by Portastatic
- Released: April 8, 2003
- Genre: Indie rock
- Label: Merge
- Producer: Mac McCaughan

Portastatic chronology
The Nature of Sap (1997)	Summer of the Shark (2003)	Bright Ideas (2005)

Professional ratings
Review scores
Source	Rating
AllMusic	4/5 stars

Summer of the Shark is Portastatic's fourth studio album. It was released on Merge Records on April 8, 2003.

The album was recorded at the home of Mac McCaughan in North Carolina except for "Hey Salty" which was recorded by Jerry Kee at Duck Kee Studio in Mebane, North Carolina. The album was mixed at Overdub Lane with John Plymale. McCaughan was the co-founder of Merge Records and also the frontman of the band Superchunk. They had earlier started to record music under the name of Portastatic in the early beginning of 90s.

McCaughan wrote the songs on Summer of the Shark in 2001 while the Superchunk was on the tour in of Here's to Shutting Up, which released mere days after September 11 attacks.

It is also said that Summer of the Shark has the internal combination of an expertly assembled mixtape.

The album was recorded at the home studio of Mac McCaughan in North Carolina, his brother Mathew plays drums on half track) except for "Hey Salty" which was recorded by Jerry Kee at Duck Kee Studio in Mebane, North Carolina. The album was mixed at Overdub Lane with John Plymale.

The album includes contributions from Janet Weiss of Sleater-Kinney and Tony Crow of Lambchop.

According to McCaughan, Summer of the Shark "is kind of a concept album about 9/11."

== Track listing ==
1. "Oh, Come Down"
2. "In The Lines"
3. "Windy Village"
4. "Through a Rainy Lens"
5. "Don't Disappear"
6. "Swimming Through Tires"
7. "Chesapeake"
8. "Noisy Night"
9. "Clay Cakes"
10. "Drill Me"
11. "Paratrooper"
12. "Hey Salty"
13. "[Untitled Hidden Track]"
